= Triumph Tiger 80 =

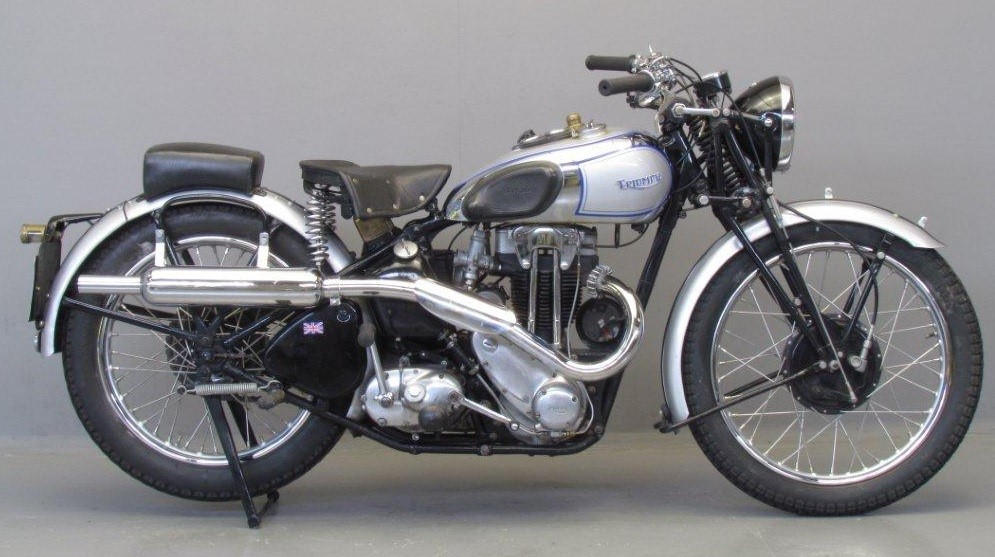
- Manufacturer: Triumph
- Production: 1936–1940
- Engine: 349 cc (21.3 cu in) four-stroke single
- Transmission: 4-speed manual, chain final drive
- Wheelbase: 55 in (140 cm)
- Weight: 365 pounds (166 kg) (dry)

The Triumph Tiger 80 is a British motorcycle made by Triumph from 1936 until 1940. There was also a 250cc Tiger 70 and a 500cc Tiger 90. Production of the Tiger ended after the outbreak of World War II and never resumed after heavy German bombing destroyed the Triumph works at Priory Street in Coventry. in the Coventry Blitz in 1940 by

== Development ==
Triumph had been losing money during the Great Depression of the 1930s and decided to concentrate on car production. However, Ariel Motorcycles Managing Director Jack Sangster had brought his company back into profit with the Ariel Square Four, and its designer Edward Turner persuaded him to take over Triumph. In 1935 Sangster appointed Turner to run the Triumph motorcycle division.

Turner designed a new range of lightweight single-cylinder motorcycles, which given the model names Tiger 70, 80, and 90. The model numbers represented the top speed. They sold well, enabling the company to break even in the first year and making a good profit the next, re-establishing Triumph. The company went on to become one of Britain's most successful motorcycle firms. The pre-war Tigers had distinctive chrome fuel tanks with silver-painted side panels.

When World War II broke out in 1939, the Tiger was developed into the military Triumph 3HW model. On 14 November 1940 the heaviest German air raid of the Coventry Blitz destroyed much of the city, including the Triumph factory, which brought production of the Tiger 80 to an end. When Triumph resumed production at a new factory in Meriden, it made only twin-cylinder models such as the Tiger 100.

In 1993 the new Hinckley Triumph company revived the Tiger model name for one of its new three-cylinder models, the Tiger 900.

== Maudes Trophy Trial ==
Harold "Harry" Perrey was a motorcycle trials rider and the Competitions Manager at Ariel in the 1930s, and responsible for sporting events to promote Ariel's motorcycle sales. In 1937 Jack Sangster asked Perrey to create a promotional event for Triumph. Perrey devised a three-hour, high-speed race for the three Tiger singles around Donington Park race track, followed the next day by a maximum speed lap of the Brooklands circuit. The motorcycles used were a Tiger 70, 80, and 90 from local Triumph dealers, and not specially race prepared. The Brooklands results for the Tiger 80, which was ridden by Allan Jefferies was an average speed of 74.68 miles per hour (120.19 km/h).

== Museum exhibits ==
The London Motorcycle Museum has a 1938 Triumph Tiger 80 on display. The Solvang Vintage Motorcycle Museum in California has a fully restored 1939 model.
