= Triumph Speed Twin =

British motorcycle

Triumph Speed Twin 5T
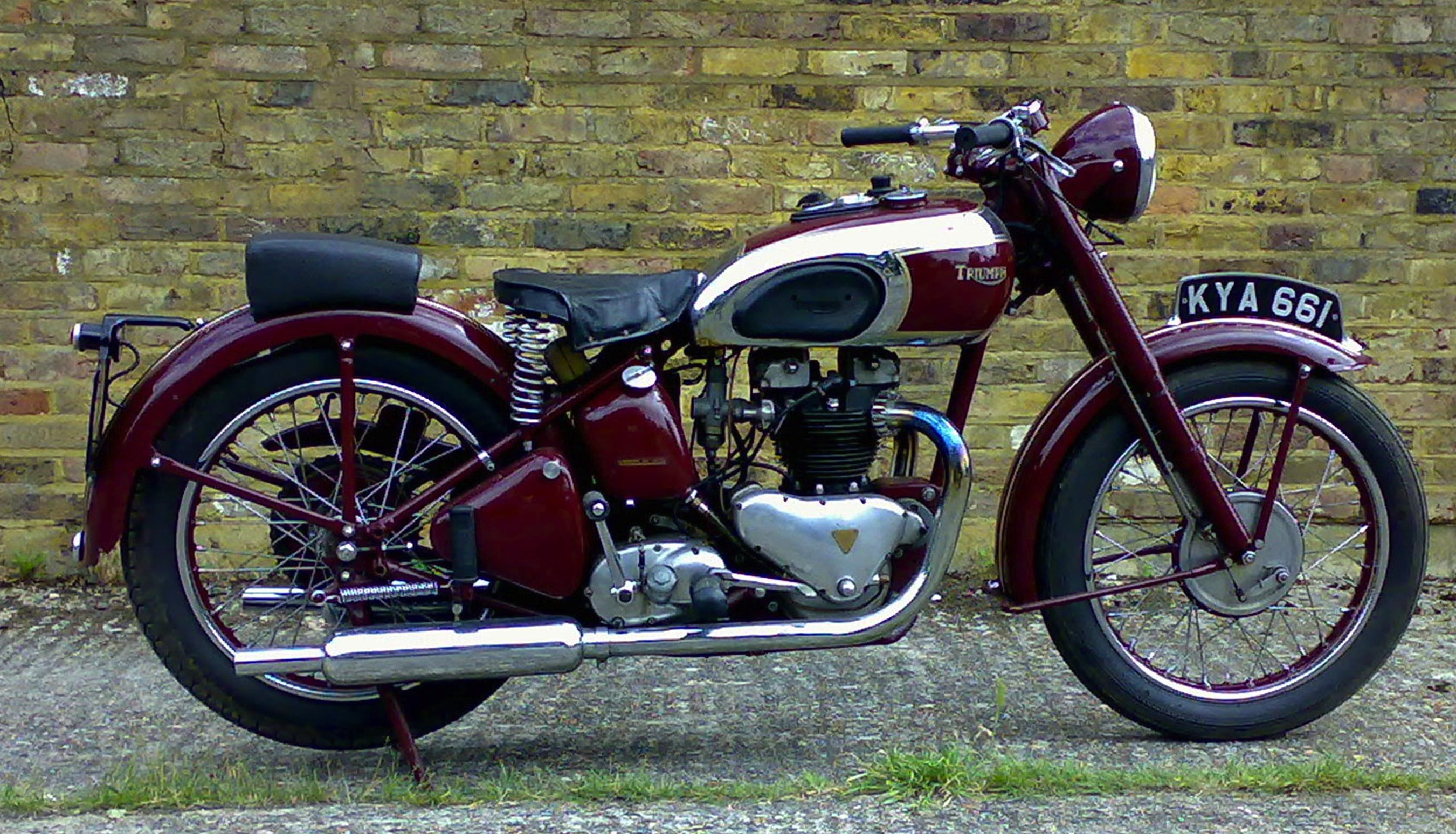
- Manufacturer: Triumph
- Production: 1938–1940, 1947–1966
- Engine: 498 cc 360-degree parallel twin OHV four-stroke
- Bore / stroke: 63 mm × 80 mm (2.5 in × 3.1 in)
- Power: 27 bhp @ 6,300 rpm
- Transmission: 4-speed manual / chain
- Wheelbase: 55 inches (140 cm)
- Weight: 365 pounds (166 kg) (dry)

The Speed Twin 5T is a standard motorcycle that was made by Triumph at their Coventry, and later Meriden factories. Edward Turner, Triumph's Chief Designer and managing director, launched the Triumph Speed Twin at the 1937 National Motorcycle Show. It was a 500 cc OHV vertical twin in a lightweight frame and the first truly successful British parallel twin, setting the standard for many twins to follow. After World War II the Speed Twin was responsible for the survival of Triumph, and several major British marques offered a 500 cc twin designed on similar lines to the Speed Twin.

== History ==
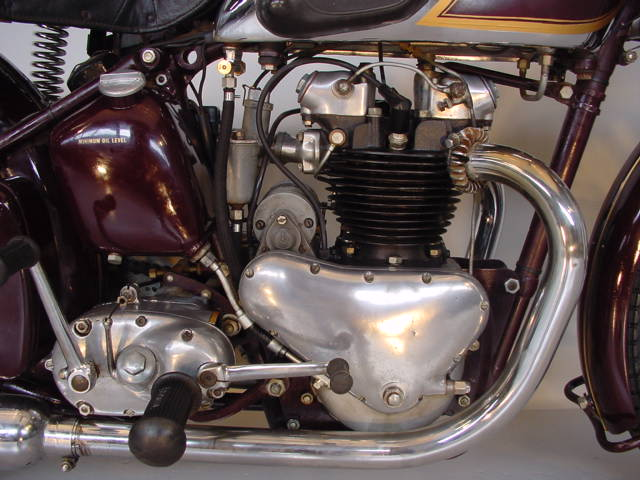
The timing side of 1937 Speed Twin engine

Edward Turner's Triumph twin was a major turning point for the British motorcycle industry, as although a 500 cc parallel twin of medium capacity was not revolutionary, the 5T Speed Twin model was lighter than many contemporary singles with significantly more power and torque. Early models were only available in 'Amaranth red' with hand painted gold pinstripes to set off the chrome. Initially the one piece iron cylinder was secured with six studs which led to weakness, so these were replaced by eight studs. The two cylinders were fed by a single Amal Type 6 carburettor and many features such as the transmission and clutch were straight from the Triumph single. Originally with a girder fork, the sprung saddle was the only rear suspension as the Speed Twin had a rigid frame – also from the single-cylinder production line.

On the night of 14 November 1940 a German air raid destroyed much of the city centre of Coventry, and the Triumph factory, which was working on an order of thousands of military specification 5T's, was completely obliterated, along with all of Triumph's technical records, drawings and designs. The Metropolitan Police Special Escort Group used the Speed Twin from 1952 until 1959.

== Development ==
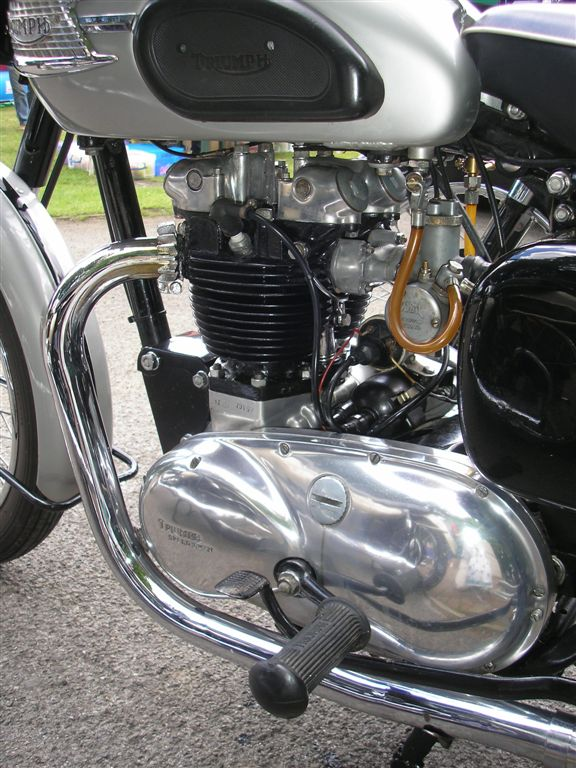
The drive side of a 1958 Speed Twin engine

After the war the recovery of Triumph at Meriden was largely due to the Speed Twin, which was developed in 1946 with a telescopic fork and optional sprung hub rear suspension. The headlamp and instrument area was tidied up in 1949 with the Turner-designed nacelle, a feature retained until the end of the model line. In 1953 the Speed Twin caused controversy among traditional British riders as the generator and magneto were replaced with a Lucas alternator and battery/coil ignition system.

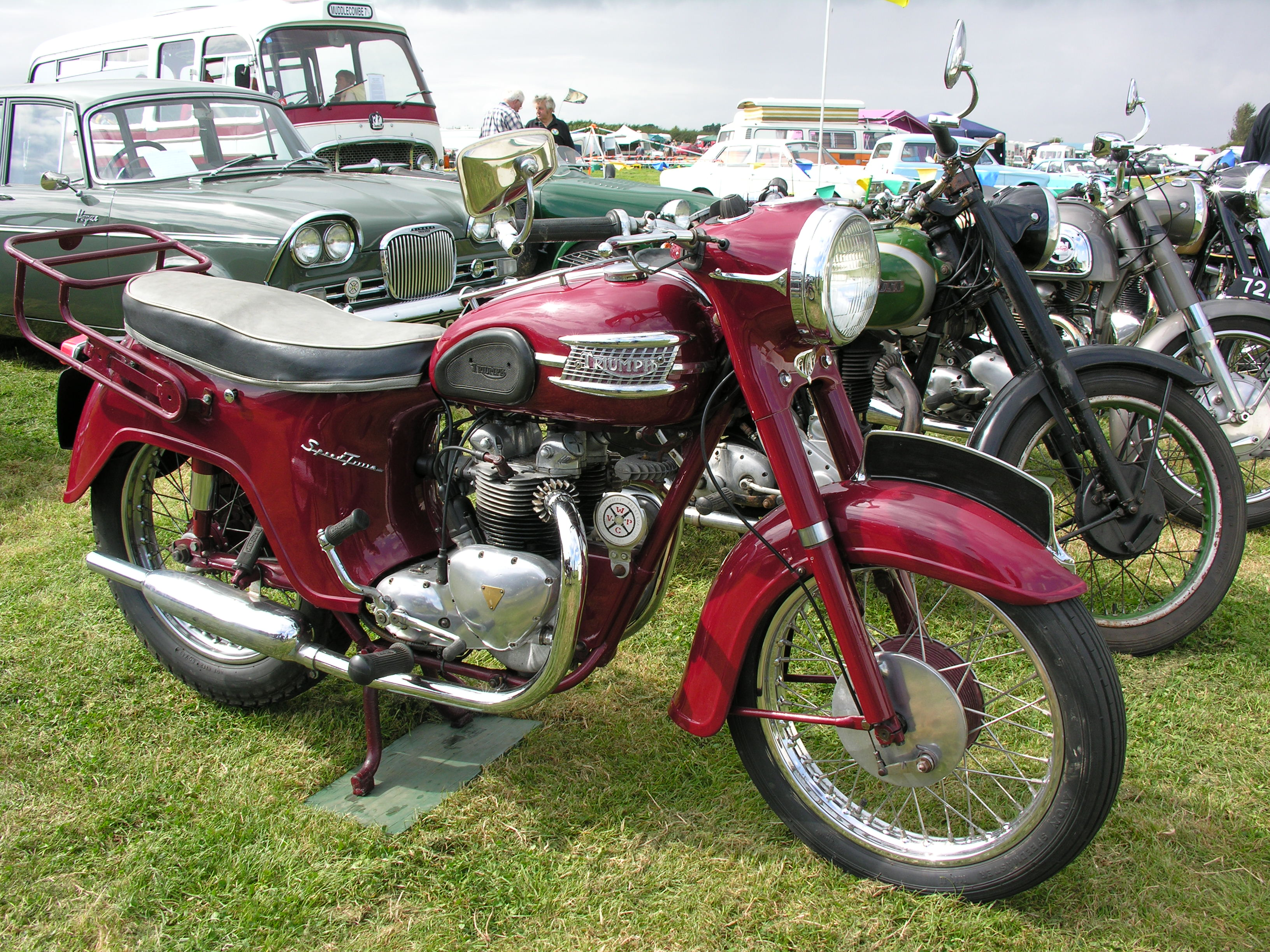
The 1959 5TA Speed Twin. Note the headlamp nacelle and rear 'bathtub' enclosure.

Further development led to the 1959 model 5TA with a unit engine and gearbox construction and styling changes including the unpopular 'Bathtub' fairing which became more and more abbreviated as the model developed before disappearing altogether for the last year of production in 1966.

The unit 500 engine continued development in the parallel Tiger 100 range, ending with the Tiger Daytona models which ceased production in 1973.

== See also ==
- List of motorcycles of the 1940s
- List of motorcycles of the 1950s
- List of Triumph motorcycles
