= Edward Turner (motorcycle designer) =

British motorcycle designer

- Turner, on the occasion of his retirement in 1967, at a private function for BSA Triumph executives

Personal details
- Born: 24 January 1901 Camberwell, United Kingdom
- Died: 15 August 1973 (aged 72) Dorking, United Kingdom
- Spouse(s): Edith Webley (1929–1939) (her death); Shirley Watts (1952–1965?)(divorced)

Edward Turner (24 January 1901 – 15 August 1973) was an English motorcycle designer. He was born in Camberwell in the London Borough of Southwark, on the day King Edward VII was proclaimed King. In 1915, Turner had his first ride on a motorcycle, a Light Tourist New Imperial.

== Turner Special ==
On 16 April 1925 "The Motor Cycle" published drawings by Turner of an OHC single he had designed, using a series of vertically stacked gears to drive the overhead camshaft. A subsequent redesign used bevel gears to drive a vertical camshaft, operating the valves through rockers. The only shared aspects of the two designs were the bore and stroke, 74 mm × 81 mm (2.9 in × 3.2 in), with the barrel being sunk into the crankcases. The head could be removed from either design complete with undisturbed valve gear.

Turner built his first bike in 1927, using his second design, a 350 cc OHC single. The Motor Cycle published a photograph of Turner's patented engine, mounted in his motorcycle called the Turner Special. The Special was registered for road use with the London County Council as YP 9286. It used Webb forks, and a three-speed Sturmey-Archer gearbox.

== Ariel designer ==
By now, living at various addresses in Peckham and East Dulwich, in the London Borough of Southwark and running Chepstow Motors, a Peckham High Street motorcycle shop with a Velocette agency, Turner conceived the Square Four engine in 1928. At this time he was looking for work, showing drawings of his engine design to motorcycle manufacturers. The engine was essentially a pair of 'across frame' OHC parallel twins joined by their geared central flywheels, with a one-piece four-cylinder block (or Monobloc) and single head. The idea for the engine was rejected by BSA, but adopted by Ariel as the Ariel Square Four. Turner was then invited by Jack Sangster to join Ariel.

By 1929, at Ariel, Jack Sangster had Edward Turner and Bert Hopwood working under Val Page in design. Turner, now 28, married Edith Webley.

=== Ariel Square Four ===
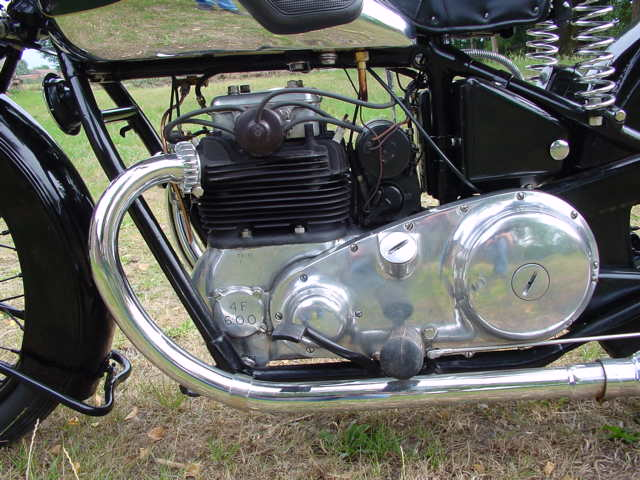
Close-up of a 1932 Ariel Square Four 4F 600 cc engine

The first Ariel Square Four 4F was shown at the Olympia Motorcycle Show in 1930 in chain-driven overhead camshaft 500 cc form. This was heavier and slower than Turner's original prototype due to production changes made necessary by the Great Depression. To make up for the extra weight, Turner increased the engine capacity to 601 cc for the 1932 Model 4F6. Ariel went bankrupt in September 1932, but was bought by Sangster, who promoted Turner to chief designer.

In 1936 Triumph decided to create separate motorcycle and car companies, and sell the motorcycle company. Ariel owner Jack Sangster bought it and changed the name to 'Triumph Engineering Company'. The Ariel Square Four changed from the 4F 600 cc OHC version to the 4G OHV 995 cc version that year.

== Triumph general manager and chief designer ==
Sangster made Turner, now 35, General Manager and Chief Designer. in this new position Turner received a 5% commission on the company's net profits, and became a shareholder with 4.9% of the equity. The first thing he did was clear space on the production floor for an office and an adjoining drawing office. Val Page had left Triumph four months before and joined BSA. Bert Hopwood came to Triumph as Turner's Design Assistant. Ted Crabtree, who was also at Ariel before, became Chief Buyer, and Freddie Clarke was made Chief Development Engineer: both were motorcycle racers.

Turner examined the line of 250, 350 (3H) and 500 cc Mk 5 singles, and rationalised them into three sports roadsters: the Tigers 70, 80, and 90. He added single-tube frames, enclosed valve gear, upswept exhausts, polished cases, new paint designs, and chrome petrol tanks.

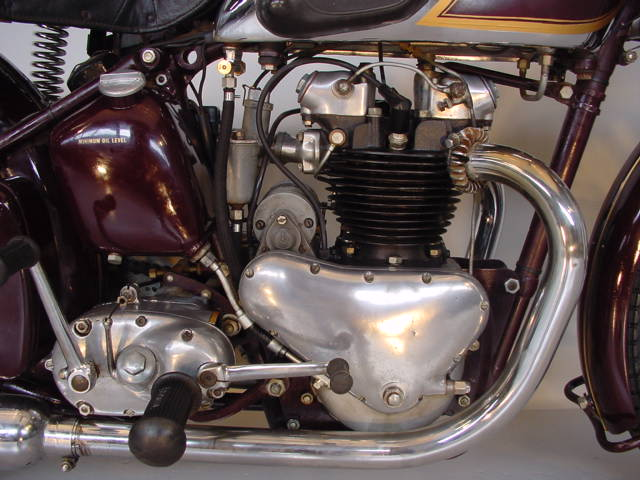
Close-up of a 1938 Triumph Speed Twin 500 cc engine

In July 1937, Turner introduced the 500 cc Speed Twin, selling at £75. It was smaller and weighed five pounds less than the £70 Tiger 90, and proved very successful. The 5T Speed Twin (some say based on the engine design of Turner's Riley Nine car) became the standard by which other twins were judged, and its descendants continued in production until the 1980s.

Turner's wife Edith died in a car crash near Coventry on 8 July 1939; the same crash killed Gillian Lynne's mother and two other friends. Turner kept in contact with Gillian Lynne thereafter.

Turner's "sprung hub" was supposed to go into production in 1941, adding 17 lb to the weight of a bike. But the war delayed its introduction until 1948.

In 1942, Turner designed a generator, using an all-alloy Triumph vertical twin engine, for the Air Ministry. After a heated disagreement with Jack Sangster, Turner quit his position at Triumph and promptly became chief designer at BSA, where he worked on a side-valve vertical twin for the war. Bert Hopwood was made Triumph's new designer and Sangster put him to work on a 500 cc side-valve twin competing for the same contract.

By 1943 Bert Hopwood completed the design, but it was never produced. Triumph's prototypes were released in February, before BSA's planned launch. The design later became the post-war TRW model. In late October, Turner went back to Triumph. Hopwood had been working on a design for a 700 cc inline four-cylinder engine that could produce 50 bhp, but Turner's return to Triumph put an end to that plan. Turner was Managing Director once again by 1944.

The Speed Twin, Tiger 100 and 3TA models emerged in 1945. They now had telescopic forks, originally designed by Turner, but modified by Freddie Clarke after it was found that fork oil would spew out on bottoming.

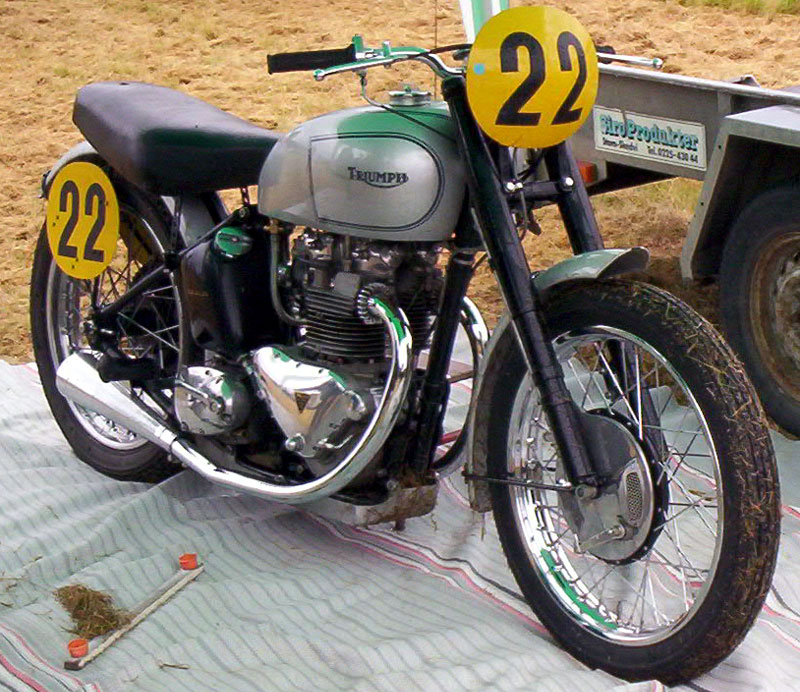
1947 500 cc Triumph T100 GP

Ernie Lyons won the first Manx Grand Prix on a Tiger 100 built by Freddie Clarke using an alloy wartime generator engine and the unreleased sprung hub in 1946. Turner, away in America, and anti-racing, was furious when he heard, but threw Lyons a victory dinner anyway, and a small batch of replica T100 GP were made for sale. Clarke resigned and joined AMC as Chief Development Engineer. Bert Hopwood had an argument with Turner over racing, left Triumph, and stayed away for 14 years.

The Mark I sprung rear hub was introduced in late 1947.

In 1948, Turner was persuaded to allow the entry of three 500 cc twins in the Senior TT, but none of them finished, so the experience only added to Turner's opposition to factory racing.

=== Triumph Thunderbird ===
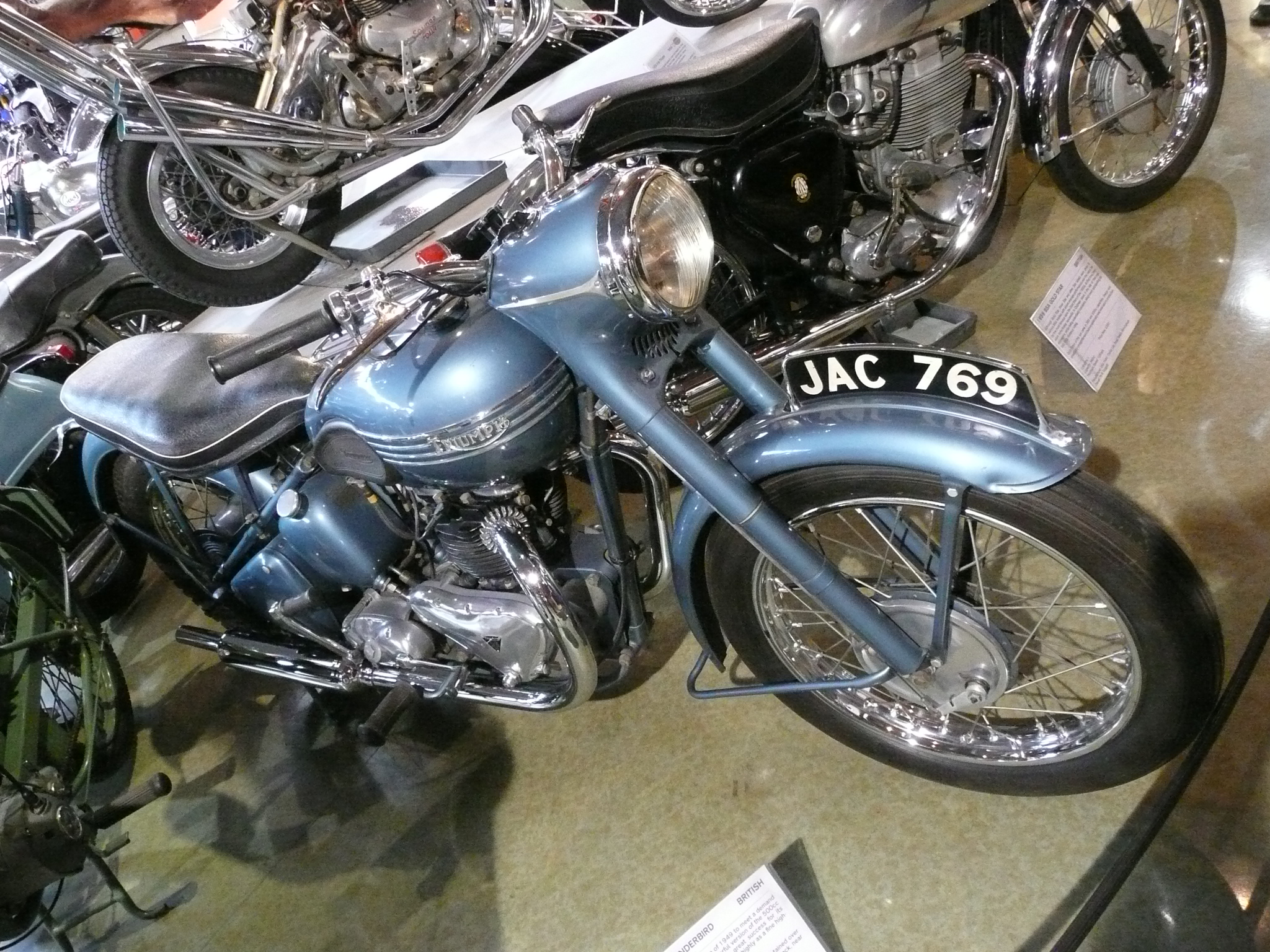
One of the Montlhery 1949 model 6T Triumph Thunderbirds on display at the National Motor Museum in Beaulieu

The 6T 650 cc Thunderbird, as designed by Turner, and further developed by Jack Wickes, was launched on 20 September 1949, when three models covered 500 miles at 90 mph (800 km at 145 km/h) in a demonstration at Montlhery. Essentially an enlarged tourer version of the Speed Twin, the 6T was designed to satisfy the substantial American export market, and was advertised as capable of a genuine 100 mph (161 km/h). The Thunderbird became a favourite of police forces worldwide.

For 1950, Turner went for a "low-chrome" policy, and banned the use of chrome fuel tanks. A chrome tank did not reappear till the 1981 Bonneville T140LE Royal Wedding edition.

Once in production, the first performance improvements came midway through the first year when the carburettor size was increased. This was the year Turner expressed the belief that 650 cc was the practical limit for the traditional British 360° vertical twin. It was the last year for the T100 GP model, although the T100C carried on, and the Mark 2 sprung hub was released.

Turner became involved in the establishment of the US-based Triumph Corp. in Maryland, a distribution company created to serve East Coast US markets. After 1950, America became Triumph's biggest customer.

In 1951 Sangster sold Triumph to BSA for £2.5 million, having previously sold Ariel to BSA in 1939. As part of the sale agreement, he joined the BSA Group as a member of the board. Turner's holdings in Triumph gave him 10% of the sale.

A race kit for the Tiger 100 was introduced, bikes were restyled with new paint and the first dual seat appeared. The Tiger 100 race kit was dropped, and the T100C came with the kit already installed. The T100C had twin-carburettors for this year only.

=== Triumph Terrier and Tiger Cub unit construction singles ===
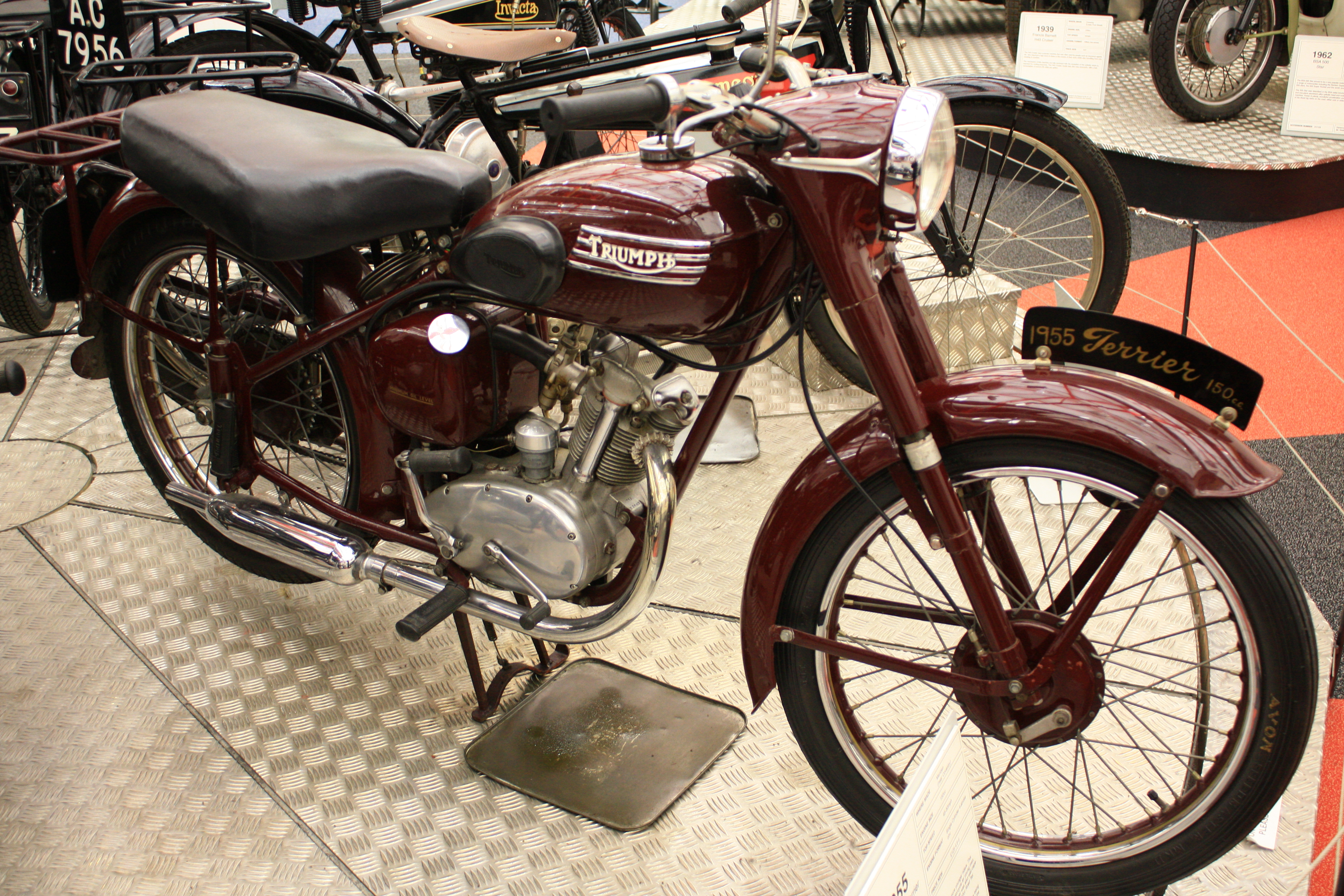
1955 Triumph T15 Terrier at the Coventry Transport Museum

The first lightweight for Triumph since 1933, a 150 cc OHV Terrier T15, four-speed unit construction single with a sloping engine, was introduced in 1953. As a result, Triumph directors Turner, Bob Fearon and Alex Masters rode from Land's End to John O'Groat's for a 1,000-mile Terrier demonstration and publicity stunt – the "Gaffers' Gallop.". .

By 1954 the sportier 200 cc version was available, and called the Tiger Cub.

In 1952, Turner married Shirley Watts. They had two daughters and a son.

=== Triumph T110 Tiger ===
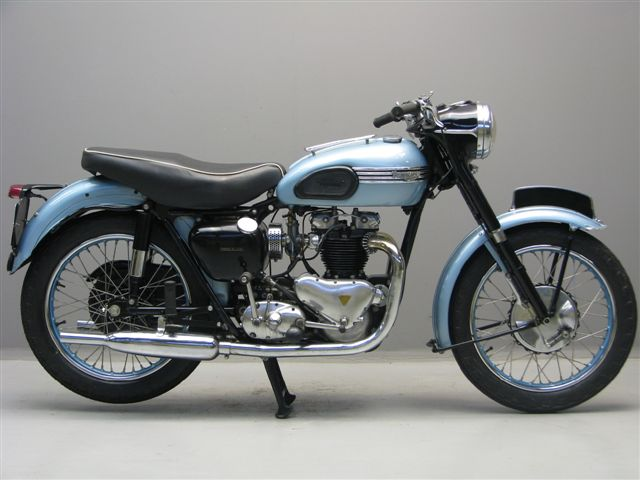
1954 650 cc Triumph T110

The production 650 cc Thunderbird was a low-compression tourer, and the 500 cc Tiger 100 was the performance bike. That changed in 1954, along with the change to swing arm frames and the release of the 650 cc Tiger 110, eclipsing the 500 cc Tiger 100 as the performance model.

== Chief Executive of BSA Group ==
In 1956, after a boardroom struggle over power and control, Jack Sangster became Chairman of BSA Group, succeeding Sir Bernard Docker. He appointed Turner Chief Executive of the Automotive Division (comprising BSA, Ariel, Triumph, Daimler and Carbodies – makers of London taxicabs).

=== Triumph 3TA unit construction twin ===
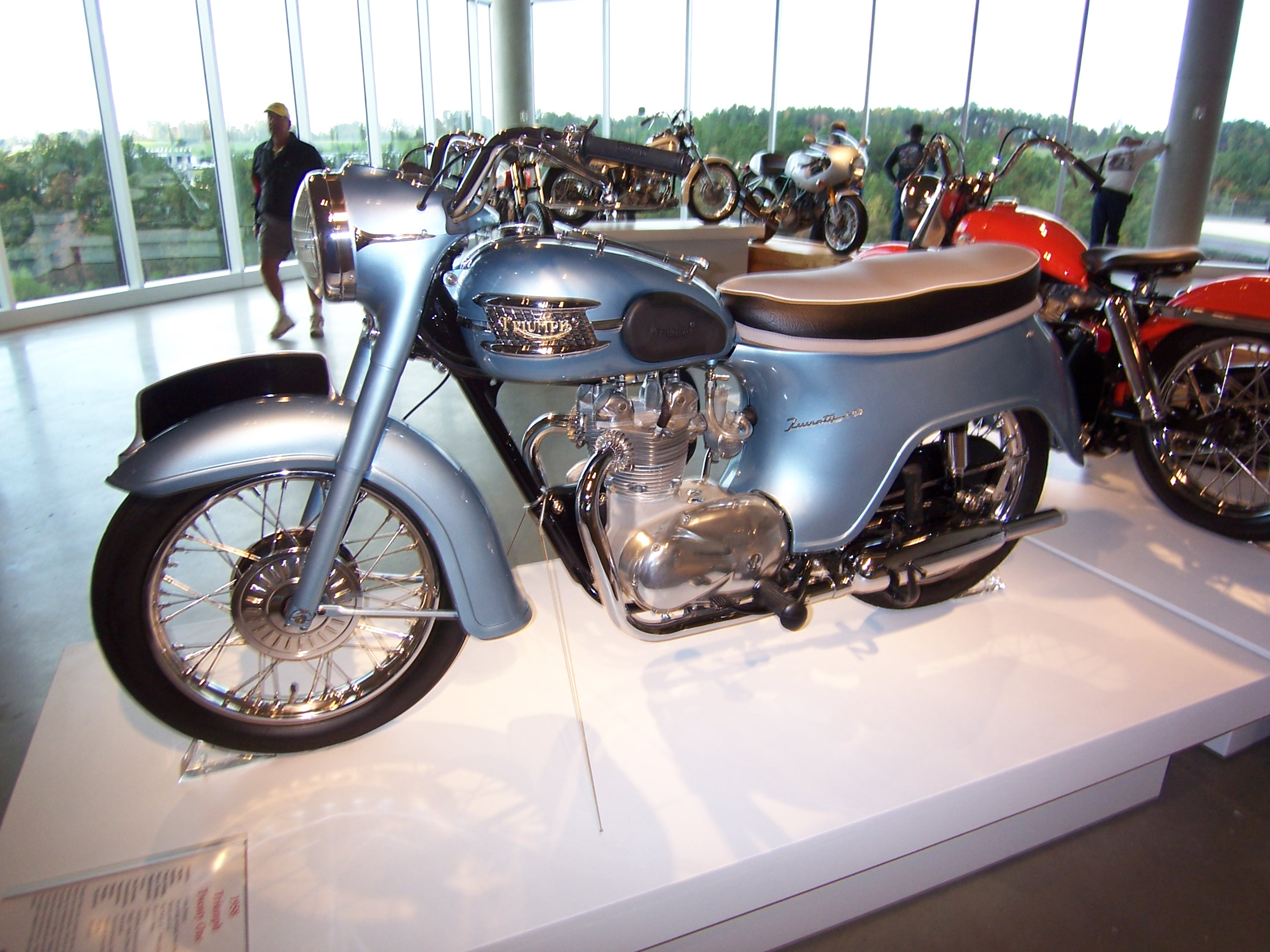
1958 350 cc Triumph Twenty-One with faired-in rear end and higher handlebars for the USA market

The first unit construction twin-cylinder motorcycle made by Triumph, the 350 cc (21 cu in) 'Twenty One' 3TA, designed by Turner and Wickes, was introduced for the 21st Anniversary of Triumph Engineering Co. Ltd in 1957. Unfortunately it also had the first "bathtub" rear enclosure, which proved to be a major styling mistake, with dealers reputedly having to remove enclosures to sell bikes.

Turner's new unit Triumph Speed Twin, the 5TA, introduced in 1959 was a 500 cc version of this engine and was similarly styled. The 6T Thunderbird and T110 models also acquired the bathtub rear fairing. Although quickly mimicked by competitors, eventually Turner relented on this unpopular feature, the 'bathtub' becoming more and more abbreviated until disappearing altogether on the final 1966 versions. Sportier versions of both the 5TA (the Tiger 100) and 3TA (the Tiger 90) were produced from 1960 to 1974 and 1963–1969, respectively.

=== Triumph T120 Bonneville ===
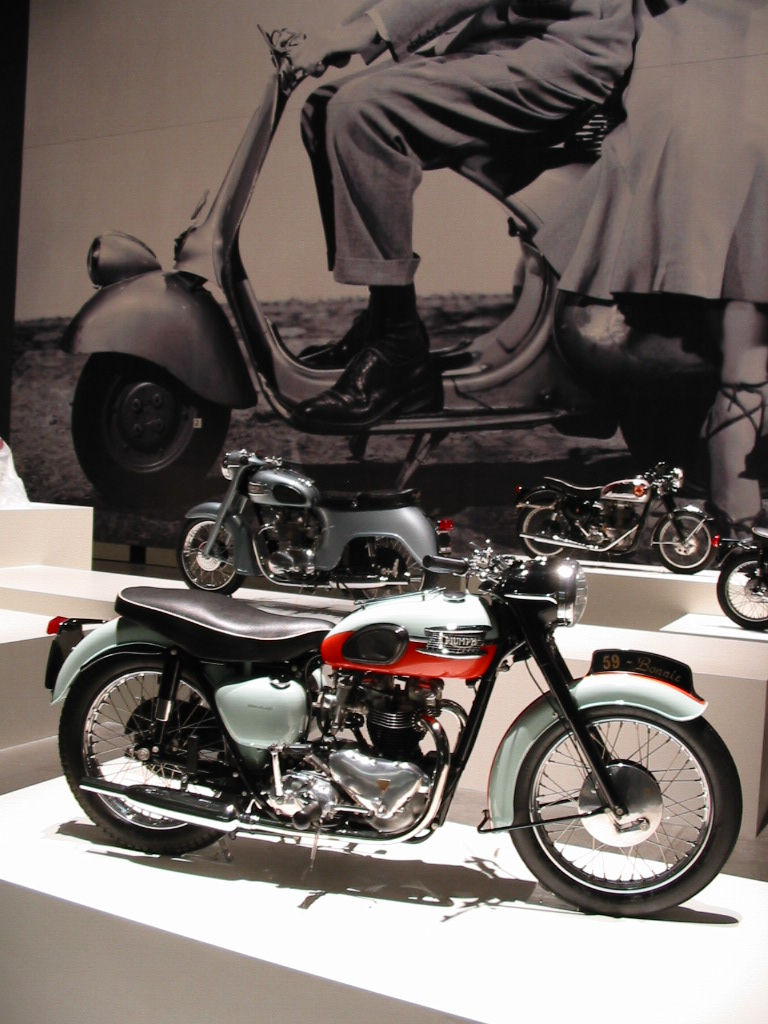
Early T120 Bonnevilles from 1959 had the headlamp-nacelle and deeply valanced mudguards used on other models but were dropped from 1960

In 1958 a twin-carburettor version of the 650 engine emerged. Triumph test rider Percy Tait hit 128 mph on a prototype Bonneville T120 at the Motor Industry Research Association (MIRA) test track. The "Bonnie" was a show stopper at the 1958 Earl's Court Motorcycle Show.

Turner, wary of racing and high-performance options, thought the Bonnie was a bad design and reputedly said to Frank Baker, Triumph's experimental department manager, "This, my boy, will lead us straight into Carey Street (where the bankruptcy courts were)."

=== Triumph T140 Bonneville ===
Notwithstanding Turner's belief that 650 cc was the practical limit for the traditional British 360° vertical twin, in the year of his death 1973 Triumph commenced production of the 750cc T140V Bonneville.

Production of the T140 continued for 10 years, including a number of 'special' models and lastly a potent 8 valve model. Triumph's Meriden factory finally closed and production ceased in 1983.

Production of the T140V resumed between 1985 and 1988. A total 1246 factory produced machines were made under licence by Messrs L F Harris, in their factory in Devon, UK. The terms of the licence meant that production had to adhere very closely to Meriden Triumph's final T140V specification and the licence agreement was not renewed in 1988.

The 750cc Bonneville engine is testament to Turner's superb design of the original 1937 Speed Twin engine upon which it was based.

=== Daimler V8 engines ===
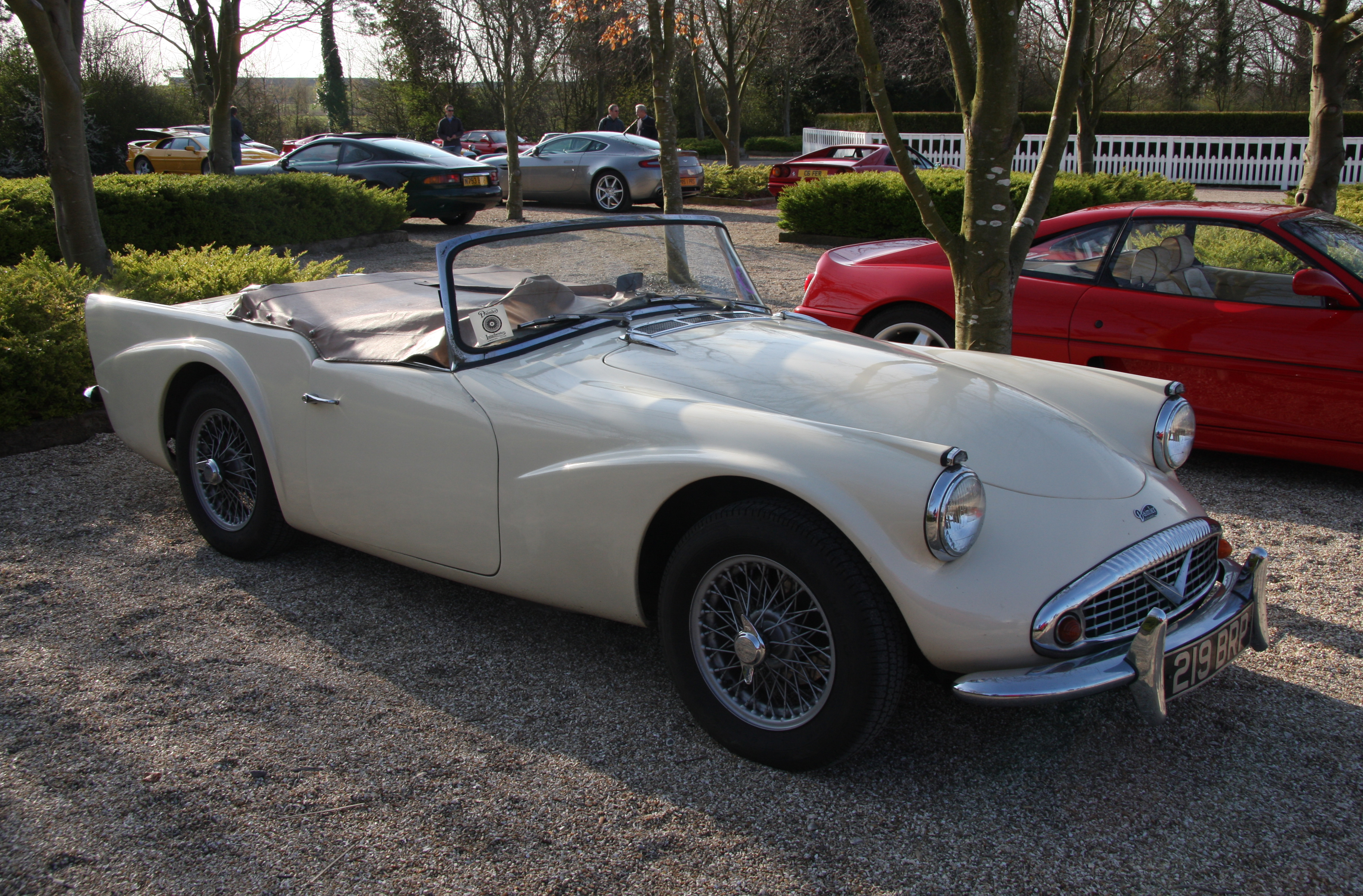
Daimler SP250 also known as the 'Dart'

For 1959 Turner designed the hemi-head Daimler 2.5 & 4.5-litre V8 engines used in the Daimler SP250 sports car and Daimler Majestic Major respectively. The valve gear was more similar to the Chrysler Hemi than the Triumph motorcycle, itself based on Riley.

In 1960 Turner went for a tour of the Honda, Suzuki and Yamaha plants in Japan and was shaken by the scale of production.

By 1961 Turner was under pressure to retire. Bert Hopwood resigned from AMC, and accepted Turner's offer to work for Triumph as Director and General Manager. It was at this time that Hopwood conceived the idea of a three-cylinder bike and engineer Doug Hele completed the drawings. Daimler was sold to Jaguar, and Edward Turner's V-8 was put into a Jaguar Mark 2 body with an upgraded interior and trademark Daimler grille, and called the Daimler 2½ litre V8.

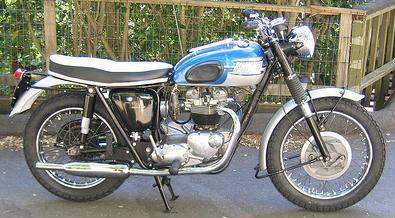
1964 Triumph TR6R Trophy with Turner's unit 650 cc engine

=== Triumph Scooters ===
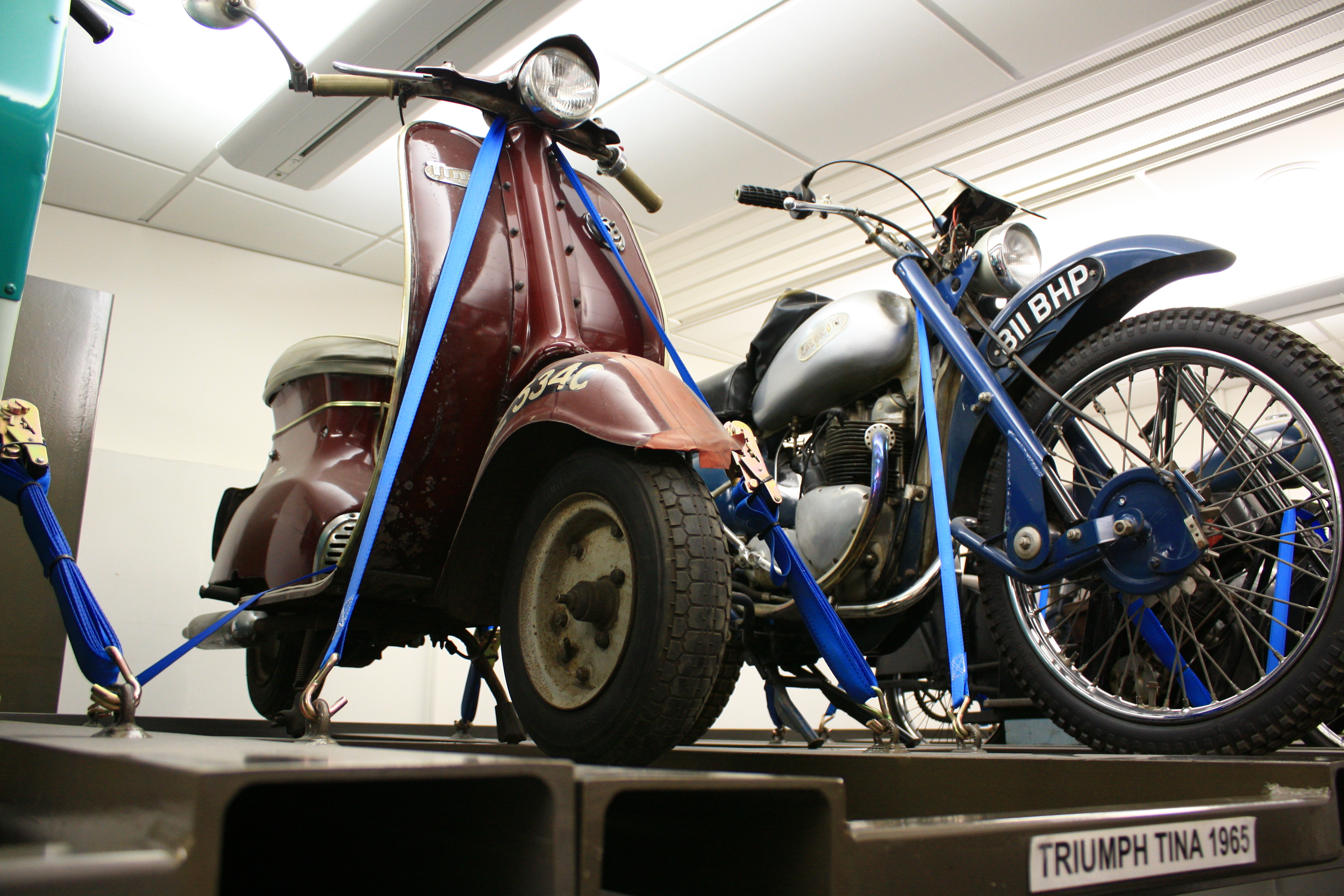
1965 Triumph Tina scooter (left) at Coventry Transport Museum

Two Turner-designed scooters were introduced, about 1958 the high-performance Triumph Tigress (also sold as the BSA Sunbeam) and in 1963 the Tina (later called the T10), a Turner-designed 100 cc automatic transmission scooter for shopping.

=== Retirement ===
Turner retired as Chief Executive of the Automotive Division (which included motorcycles) in 1963, but retained his BSA directorship. He was apparently by this time unhappy about the direction the company was taking. Bert Hopwood had hopes of being appointed Turner's successor, but the job went to BSA's Harry Sturgeon.

BSA management now took over Triumph policy completely. Sturgeon decided to streamline motorcycle operations after McKinsey, an international business consultant, recommended treating the two companies as one.

1966 saw Turner working on a large-displacement, four-cylinder engine design which was not built.

In 1967, Turner, at 66, retired from the BSA Board and Harry Sturgeon took his place. Unlike Turner, Sturgeon was convinced Triumph had to be involved in racing, and John Hartle won the 1967 Isle of Man TT production event on a Bonneville, just before Harry Sturgeon suddenly died, and was replaced by Lionel Jofeh.

=== Triumph Bandit and BSA Fury ===
In November 1970 the ailing company's last major press and trade launch was held. In the lineup was an ohc 350 cc twin with twin carburettors and five-speed transmission, designed by Turner (already retired) as his last project, and further refined by Bert Hopwood and Doug Hele. It was to be sold as both the Triumph Bandit and BSA Fury, each distinguished by minor cosmetic changes and paint schemes, with 34 bhp and capable of 110 mph. Although included in that year's brochures, financial problems forced cancellation of the model before any production. Several pre-production prototypes still exist.

This model represented an attempt by BSA-Triumph to compete in the wider 350 cc category, being a large-selling engine-displacement at the time. In an early 1970s issue of Cycle Buyers Guide (a yearly listing of all available motorcycles) it was stated that in the year prior to that issue, Honda had sold more 350 cc motorcycles than Yamaha had sold motorcycles.

== Commemoration ==
When the Royal Mail issued six postage stamps on 19 July 2005 each featuring a classic British motorcycle, Turner was the only designer cited by name in the accompanying presentation packet notes. This was in relation to the 47 pence stamp featuring his 1938 Triumph Speed Twin.

In 2008, an address where Turner lived and worked in Peckham, South-East London was awarded a Blue plaque by Southwark Borough Council, following a popular public vote in 2007. The Blue Plaque at 8 Philip Walk, where he lived whilst working for his father's bottle-brush factory itself now at 6 Philip Walk, was unveiled by his son, Edward Turner Jr on Sunday 25 October 2009 in the presence of his siblings, Jane Meadows and Charmian Hawley.

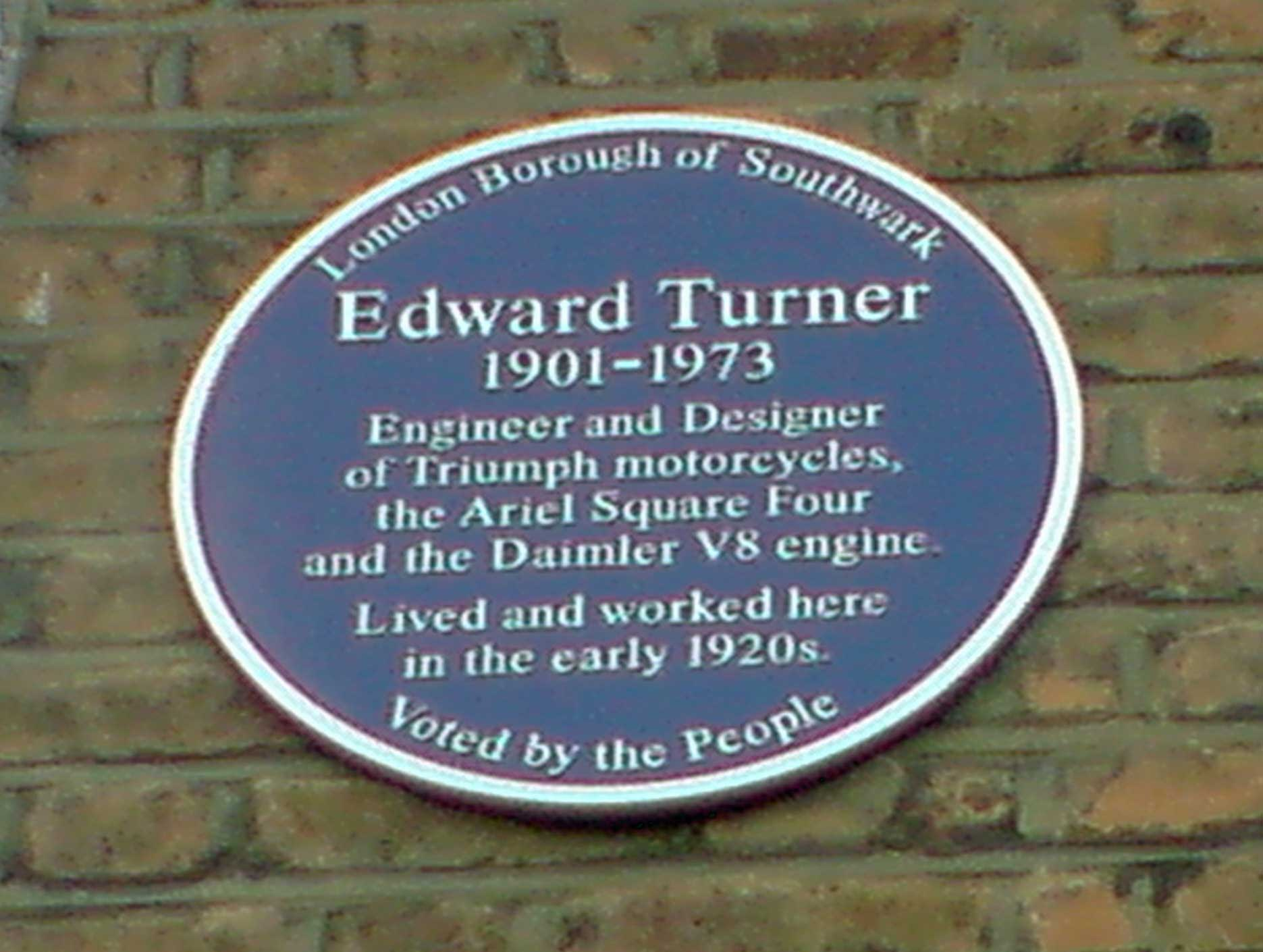
Turner's Blue plaque at his former residence, 8 Philip Walk, Peckham, London SE15

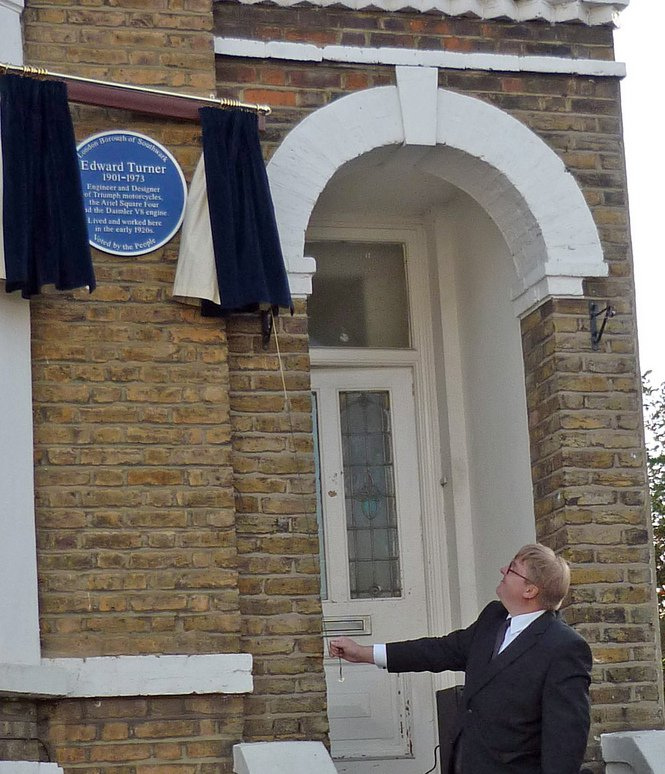
The Blue Plaque unveiling by Edward Turner Jr., in October 2009
