= Triumph Tigress/BSA Sunbeam =

British scooter

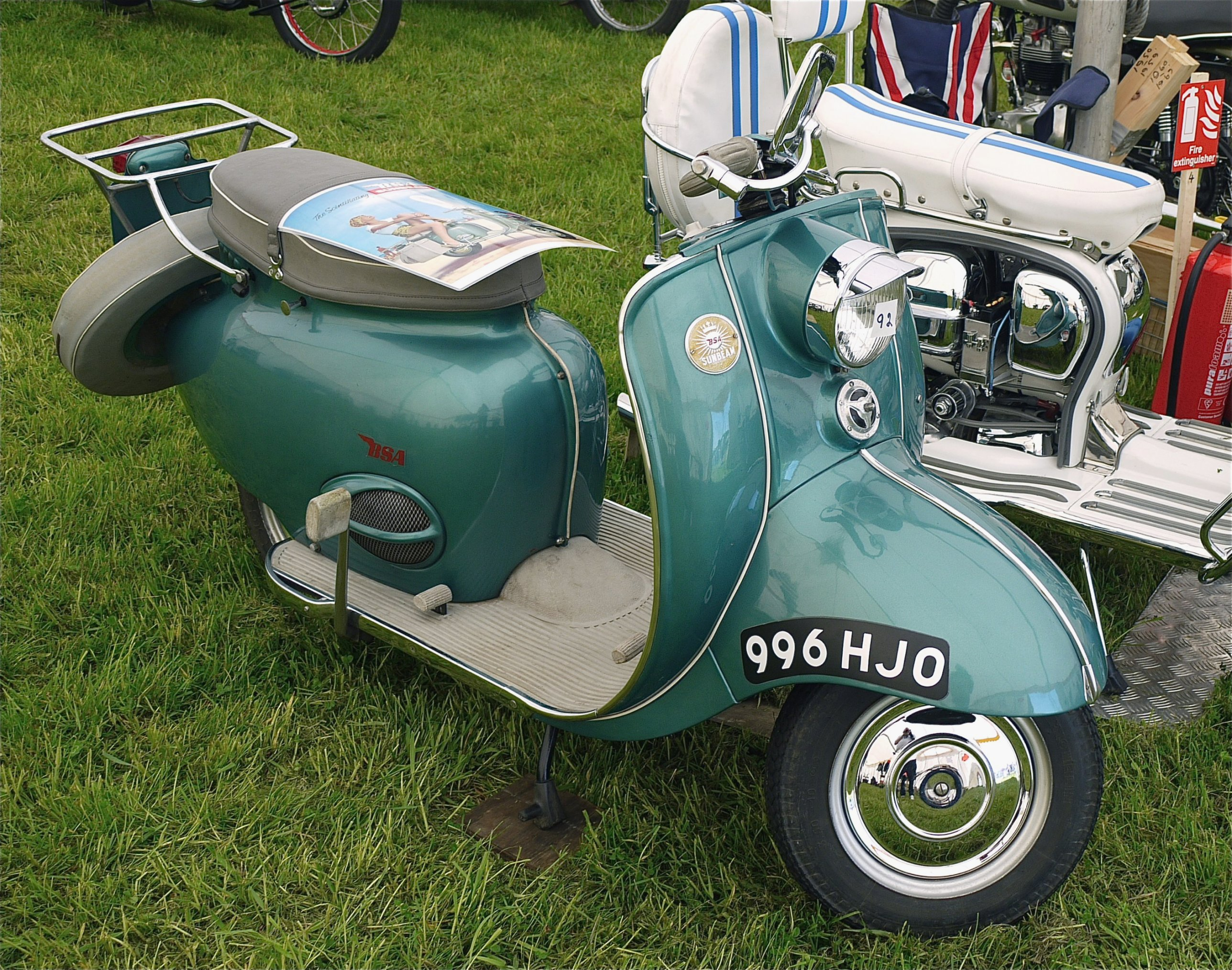
BSA Sunbeam scooter

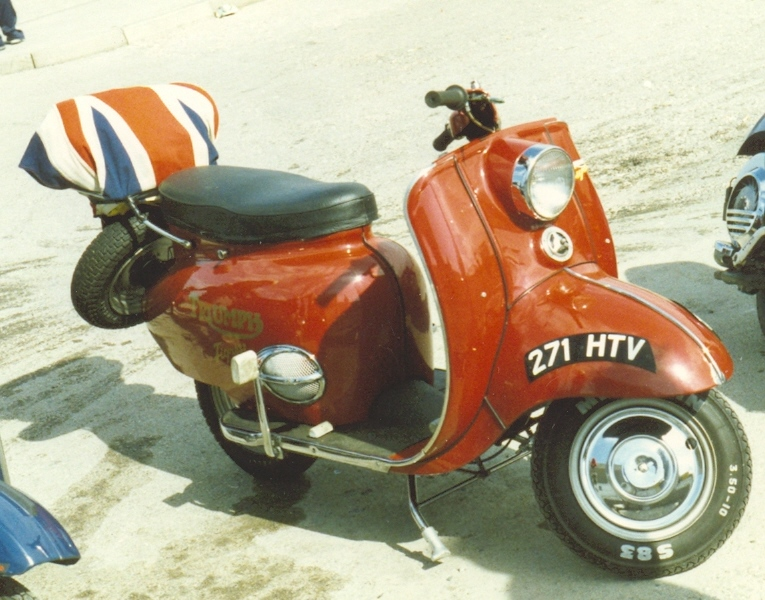
Triumph Tigress scooter

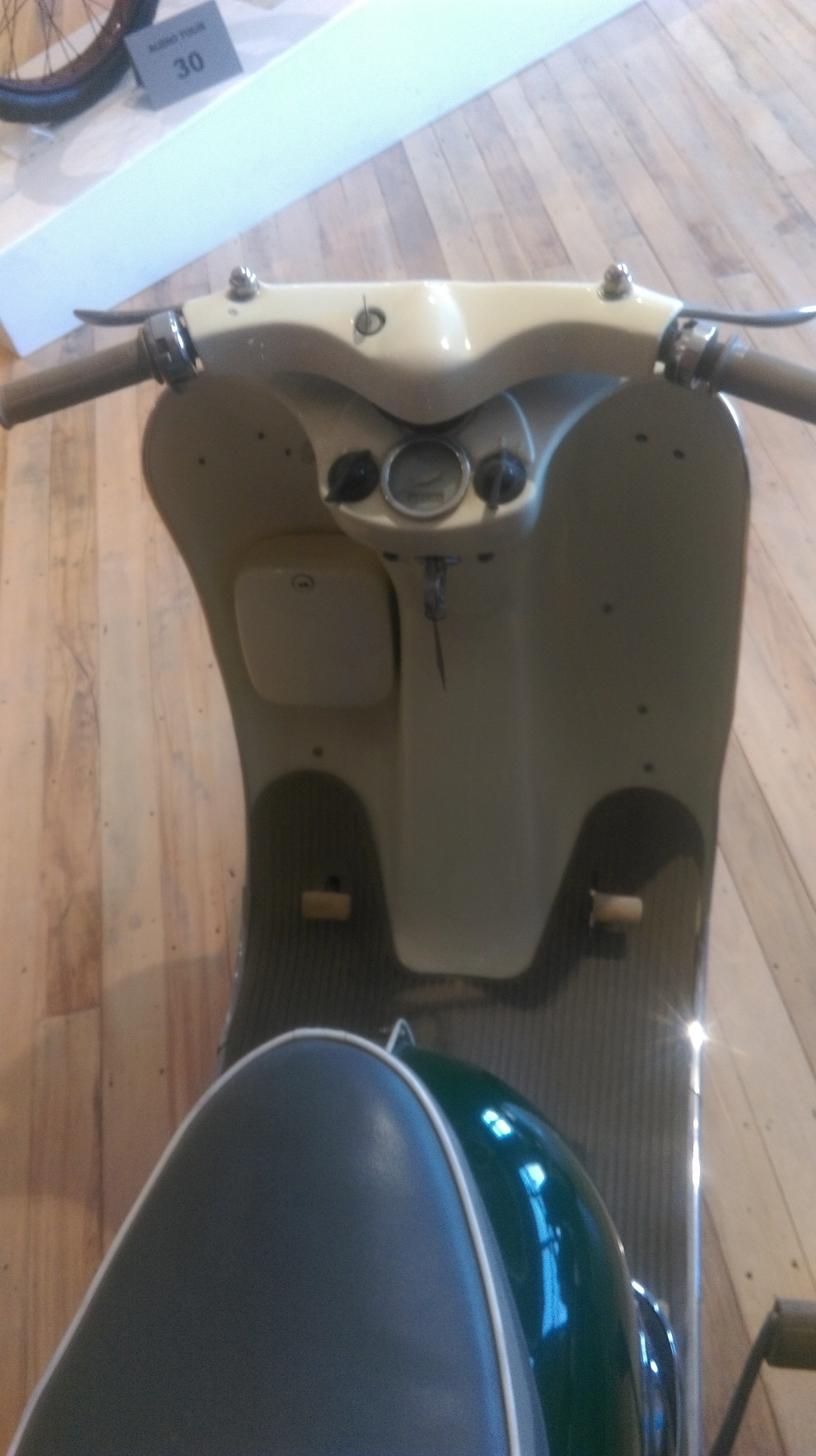
Triumph Tigress birds-eye view

The Triumph Tigress, also sold as the BSA Sunbeam, was a scooter designed to have good performance and handling for the motorcycle enthusiast. The entry of the BSA group into the scooter field was announced by Edward Turner in October 1958. The 250 cc model would have a cruising speed of 55 to 60 mph (89 to 97 km/h) and petrol consumption of 120 miles per imperial gallon (2.4 L/100 km; 100 mpg_{‑US}). A prototype 250 cc BSA Sunbeam was displayed at the 1958 Earl's Court Cycle and Motor Cycle Show. Manufacture started in late 1959, but delivery difficulties were acknowledged due to problems with recruiting labour, although it was claimed that the group had a manufacturing capacity of 50,000 machines a year.

The design by Edward Turner drew on Triumph's long experience of building fast motorcycles, and was sold under two brand names to take advantage of established distribution networks. This badge engineering was one of the last uses of the Sunbeam marque. The differences between the BSA Sunbeam and Triumph Tigress were entirely cosmetic - the former in polychromatic green paint, also two-tone red and cream, with a BSA badge; the latter in a shell blue or mimosa and ivory (two tone) with Triumph badging.

The scooter was available with a 250 cc four-stroke twin (10 hp; 7.5 kW) or 175 cc two-stroke single-cylinder engine (7.5 hp; 5.6 kW). Both engines were forced-air-cooled and curbed to keep low petrol consumption. The two-stroke was a development of the BSA Bantam engine but the four-stroke was a completely new parallel-twin with gear rather than chain drive to the gearbox. The contact-breaker fed two ignition coils, each of which had a lead to its spark plug without a distributor. Drive to the rear wheel was by a fully enclosed chain in an oil bath. Both versions had four, foot-operated gears. Some of the 250 twins were fitted with an electric starter and a 12 volt (not 6 volt) electrical system. The 250 twin sold well and could do 70 mph (113 km/h) with efficient suspension and good roadholding despite having only 10-inch wheels. The weight was low in comparison to other scooters (100/110 kg). The only problem was build quality: it was sometimes said that a Tigress was a joy to own so long as someone else was paying the repair bills.

The 250 cc four-stroke model was discontinued in 1964, the 175 cc two-stroke model in 1965.

Later in the 1960s, despite internal opposition from those who felt that scooters would dilute the macho image of the brand, Triumph (owned by BSA) produced another scooter and a motor tricycle for "shoppers". The Triumph Tina and the Ariel 3 tricycle (BSA also owned the Ariel marque) were intended to tap into the market segment for a convenient 'shopping basket'.

== See also ==
- List of motorcycles of the 1950s
- List of scooter manufacturers
