= Triumph Tina =

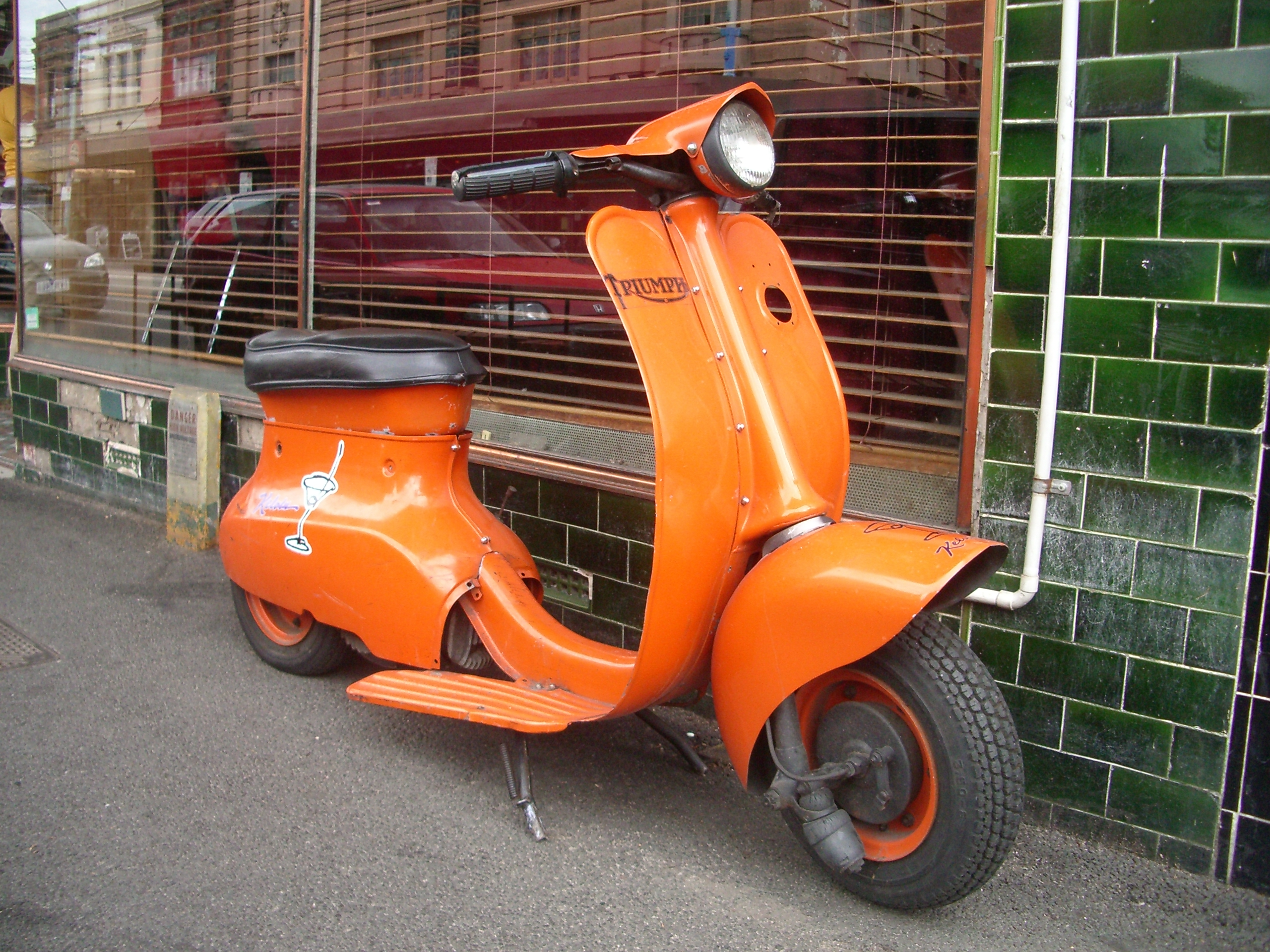
- Triumph Tina
- Manufacturer: Triumph Engineering Co Ltd
- Also called: Triumph T10
- Production: 1962–1970
- Assembly: Meriden, West Midlands, UK
- Class: Scooter
- Engine: 100 cc (6.1 cu in) air-cooled, two-stroke single with alloy cylinder head
- Bore / stroke: 50.4 mm × 50 mm (1.98 in × 1.97 in)
- Compression ratio: 7:1
- Top speed: 45 mph (72 km/h)
- Power: 4.5 hp (3 kW) at 5,000 rpm
- Transmission: Continuously variable transmission (Automatic V-belt)
- Suspension: Front: rubber dampener Rear: single spring/damper unit
- Brakes: 5 in (127 mm) drums
- Tyres: 3.50 x 8
- Wheelbase: 46.375 in (1,178 mm)
- Dimensions: L: 63.5 in (1,613 mm)
- Seat height: 26 in (660 mm)
- Weight: 143 lb (64.9 kg) (dry)
- Fuel capacity: 1.5 imp gal (6.8 L; 1.8 US gal)
- Oil capacity: mixed with fuel
- Related: Peel Trident

The Triumph Tina also known as the Triumph T10 was a small and low-performance scooter with a 100 cc (6.1 cu in) two-stroke engine, an automatic transmission, and a handlebar carry basket.

== Development ==
In 1962, despite internal opposition from those who felt it would dilute the macho image of the brand, Triumph introduced a new scooter, designed by Edward Turner, to tap into a strong demand that had been identified by market research for a simple and easy-to-ride "shopping basket" vehicle.

The Tina used a continuously variable transmission (CVT) system with a centrifugal clutch; the system had been patented by Turner and Triumph in May 1959. The engine was mounted on the swingarm.

An extensive marketing campaign was carried out, fronted by a pop star of the era, Cliff Richard. The Tina was marketed to women, and advertising focused on the ease of its operation. Despite this the Tina sold in small numbers.

The Tina's patented drivetrain had technical problems. The CVT drive belt would derail and seize the transmission and the rear wheel, disabling the scooter and also preventing it from being pushed. Also, the starting procedure for the Tina required moving a switch on the handlebar to "start" before kick starting the scooter; this activated a governor to keep the engine speed too low to activate the transmission. If the switch was in "drive" on starting the scooter, it would accelerate immediately; this happened to Turner, causing a crash into a kerb and a broken ankle.

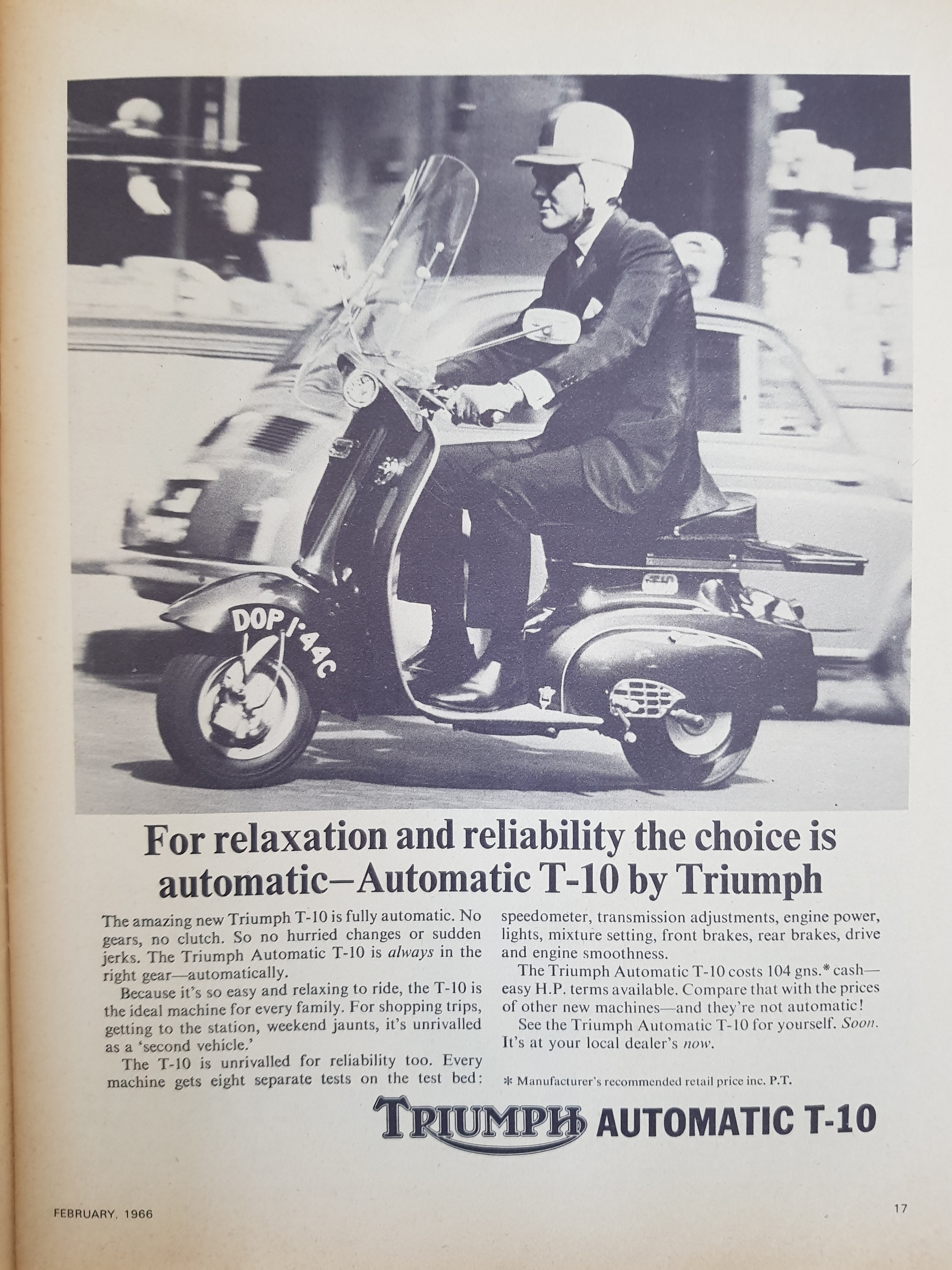
Triumph T-10 Automatic Advertisement 1966

=== T10 ===
The Tina was replaced by the Triumph T10 in 1965. The T10 included an improved CVT and the "start/drive" control moved from the handlebar to inside the seat, with the "drive" setting activated automatically by the rider's weight, so that the drive was only engaged once the driver was seated. This led to an embarrassing incident while demonstrating the T10 at its press launch. The switch had been set at 10 stone (140 lb; 64 kg), but the woman who was to ride the scooter away weighed only 8 stone (112 lb; 51 kg), the switch was not activated, and the scooter would not move. The T10 was discontinued about 1970.

=== Three-wheeled prototypes ===
Triumph made a series of twelve prototype Tina tilting three-wheelers, similar in concept to the Ariel 3 moped. Disagreements between Triumph and the system's designer ended any plans for production.

== See also ==
- Triumph Tigress – Triumph's earlier and larger scooter, in production from 1958 to 1965.
- List of Triumph motorcycles
