= Triumph sprung hub =

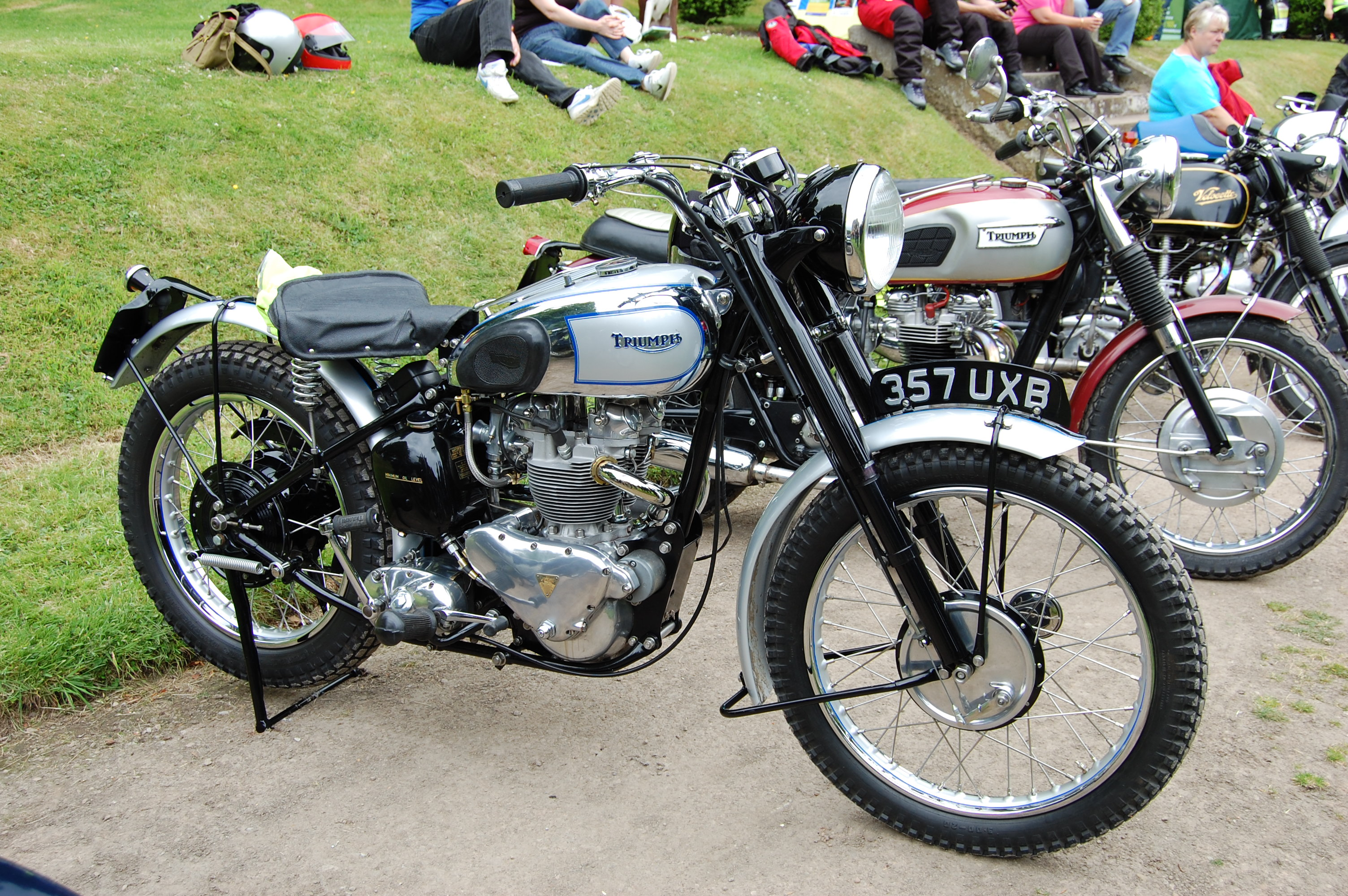
Triumph TR5 Trophy with sprung hub

The Triumph sprung hub is a motorcycle suspension unit contained within a rear wheel hub. It was designed by Triumph engineer Edward Turner to give Triumph's existing rigid frames the option of rear suspension. It was one of the first motorcycle components to have a safety warning cast into its housing.

== Design and development ==
Edward Turner designed Triumph's sprung hub in 1938. The design was inspired by Dowty hubs with suspension within them, as used in the fixed landing gear of Gloster Gladiator fighter aircraft. Turner's design used a plunger-type suspension made small enough to fit inside the wheel hub. A significant difference between the two is that the Dowty hub was an overhung bearing, supported from one side. Provided that the overall height of the suspension unit, plus the travel, was smaller than the inner diameter of the wheel hub, it allowed a fairly simple design. The Triumph hub though was mounted on a small diameter fixed axle between the sides of the frame, carrying the suspension unit and springs inside the hub. The two bearings were mounted on this suspended casing. The hub itself was a hollow drum with two end discs bolted to it, which housed the bearings. The limitation of this design was that the small axle and the suspension travel needed to fit through the centre of the bearings, which required a much larger bearing than usual, yet still only gave a small travel. With one spring above the rear axle and two below, the sprung hub provided about two inches of vertical travel and weighed 17 pounds (7.7 kg) more than a conventional hub. It was designed to allow rear suspension to be offered optionally without altering Triumph's existing frames. The sprung hub did not provide a drive gear for the speedometer, so the design of the transmission was revised to provide the required drive gear.

Frank Baker, the head of the Experimental Department at Triumph, tried to convince Turner that the handling of Triumph motorcycles at the time the sprung hub was available was potentially dangerous at speed, to the point of having himself filmed while riding one of them on a test track at speed. Turner ignored Baker's efforts and continued with the sprung hub.

== Reception ==
Turner had intended to introduce the sprung hub with Triumph's 1940 motorcycles, but the outbreak of the Second World War prevented this; the sprung hub was ultimately introduced in 1946. The Mk. 2 version replaced the original in 1951. While the original version was provided with a grease nipple, the Mk. II version had no provision for greasing, with the factory grease packing expected to last for 20,000 miles (32,000 km). The sprung hub was the only rear suspension offered with Triumph's parallel-twin motorcycles until 1955.

== Legacy ==
The sprung hub is remembered as one of the first motorcycle products to have a safety warning cast into its housing, warning of the risk of dismantling the spring housing inside the hub and releasing the powerful springs. It is also remembered for inadequacy, being described as "a pain in the rear end" and "one of the weirdest and worst rear suspension systems of all time".
