= Triumph Engineering =

British motorcycle manufacturer 1886–1983

Coordinates: 52.4325°N 1.6094°W

Triumph Engineering Co Ltd
- Industry: Motorcycles
- Founded: 1886–7
- Defunct: 23 August 1983
- Fate: Bankrupt
- Successor: Triumph Motorcycles Ltd
- Headquarters: Meriden, England
- Key people: Jack Sangster; Edward Turner; Val Page
- Products: List of Triumph motorcycles

Triumph Engineering Co Ltd was a British motorcycle manufacturing company, based originally in Coventry and then in Meriden. A new company, Triumph Motorcycles Ltd, based in Hinckley, gained the name rights after the end of the company in the 1980s and is now one of the world's major motorcycle manufacturers.

== Origins ==
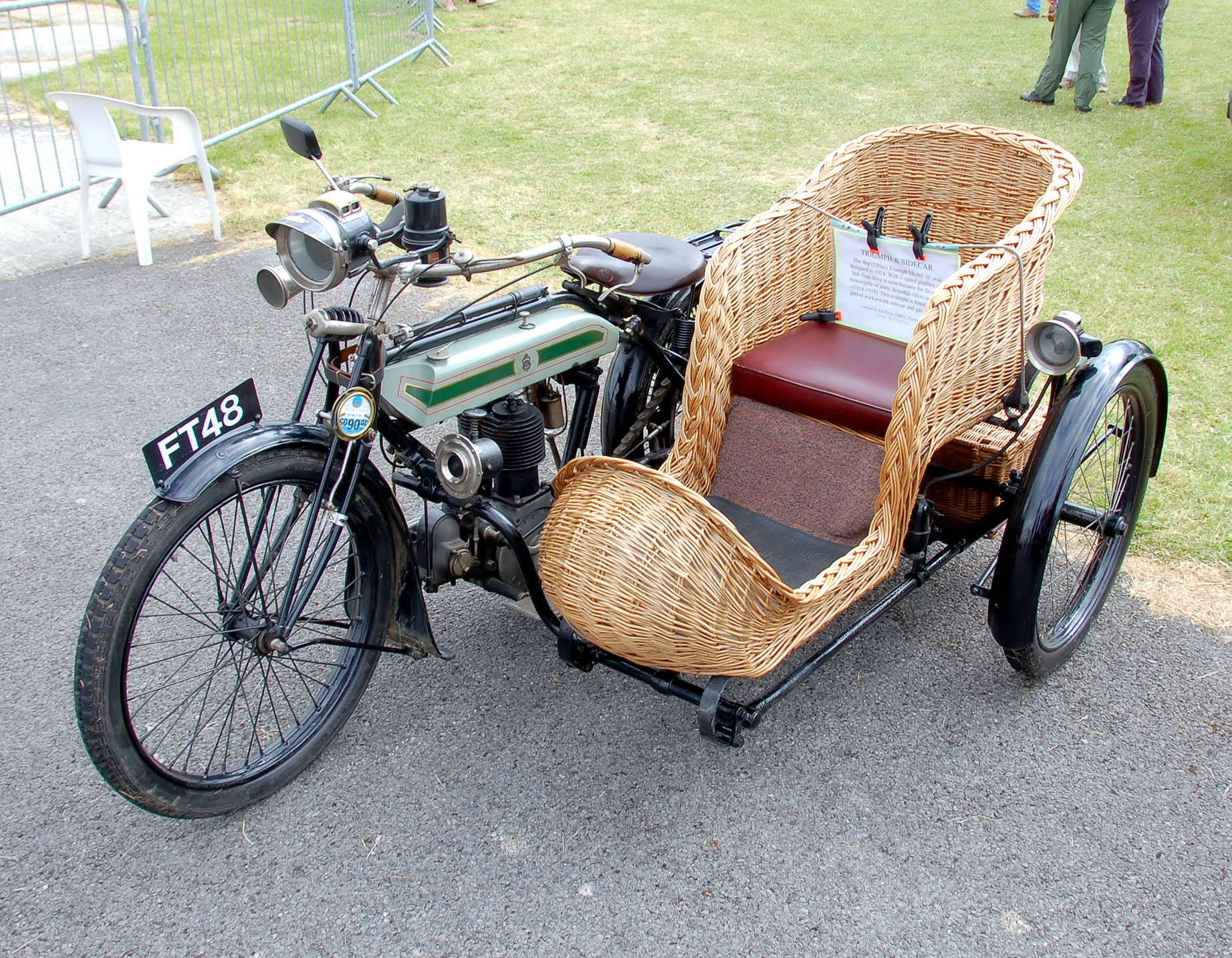
Model H, the "Trusty Triumph". 57,000 were made between 1915 and 1923

The company was started by Siegfried Bettmann, who had emigrated from Nuremberg, part of the German Empire, to Coventry in England in 1883. In 1884, aged 20, Bettmann had founded his own company, the S. Bettmann & Co. Import Export Agency, in London. Bettmann's original products were bicycles, which the company bought and then sold under its own name. Bettmann also distributed sewing machines imported from Germany.

In 1886, Bettmann sought a more specific name, and the company became known as the Triumph Cycle Company. A year later, the company was registered as the New Triumph Co. Ltd, now with funding from the Dunlop Pneumatic Tyre Company. During that year, another native of Nuremberg, Moritz Schulte, joined the company as a partner.

Schulte encouraged Bettmann to transform Triumph into a manufacturing company, and in 1888 Bettmann purchased a site in Coventry using money lent by his and Schulte's families. The company began producing the first Triumph-branded bicycles in 1889. In 1896 Triumph also opened a bicycle factory in Nuremberg.

In 1898 Triumph decided to extend production at Coventry to include motorcycles, and by 1902 the company had produced its first motorcycle—a bicycle fitted with a Belgian Minerva engine. In 1903, after selling more than 500 motorcycles, Triumph began motorcycle production at the Nuremberg factory. During the first few years the company based its designs on those of other manufacturers, but in 1904 Triumph began building motorcycles based on its own designs, and 1905 saw the first entirely in-house designed motorcycle. By the end of that year, the company had produced more than 250.

In 1907, after the company opened a larger plant, it produced 1,000 machines. Triumph had also initiated a lower-end brand, Gloria, also manufactured in the company's original plant.

Confusion between motorcycles produced by the Coventry and Nuremberg Triumph companies resulted in the latter's products being renamed Orial for certain export markets. However, a company named Orial already existed in France, so the Nuremberg motorcycles were renamed again as "TWN", standing for Triumph Werke Nürnberg.

== First World War and the 1920s ==
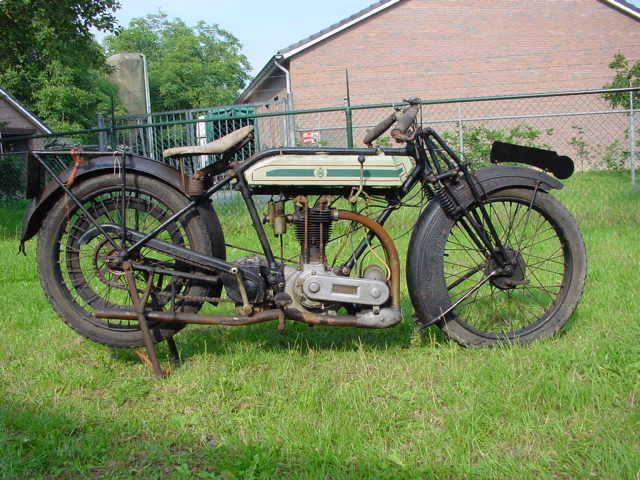
1924 Triumph Ricardo

The beginning of the First World War was a boost for the company as production was switched to provide for the Allied war effort. More than 30,000 motorcycles—among them the Model H Roadster also known as the "Trusty Triumph", often cited as the first modern motorcycle—were supplied to the Allies.

After the war, Bettmann and Schulte disagreed about planning, with Schulte wishing to replace bicycle production with cars. Schulte ended his association with the company, but during the 1920s Triumph purchased the former Hillman company car factory in Coventry and produced a saloon car in 1923 under the name of the Triumph Motor Company. Harry Ricardo produced an engine for their latest motorbike.

By the mid-1920s Triumph had become one of Britain's main motorcycle and car makers, with a 500,000 square feet (46,000 m^{2}) plant capable of producing as many as 30,000 motorcycles and cars each year. Triumph also found its bicycles demanded overseas, and export sales became a primary source of the company's revenues, although for the United States, Triumph models were manufactured by licence. The company's first automotive success was the Super Seven model, which debuted in 1928. Soon after, the Super Eight model was developed.

== 1930s ==
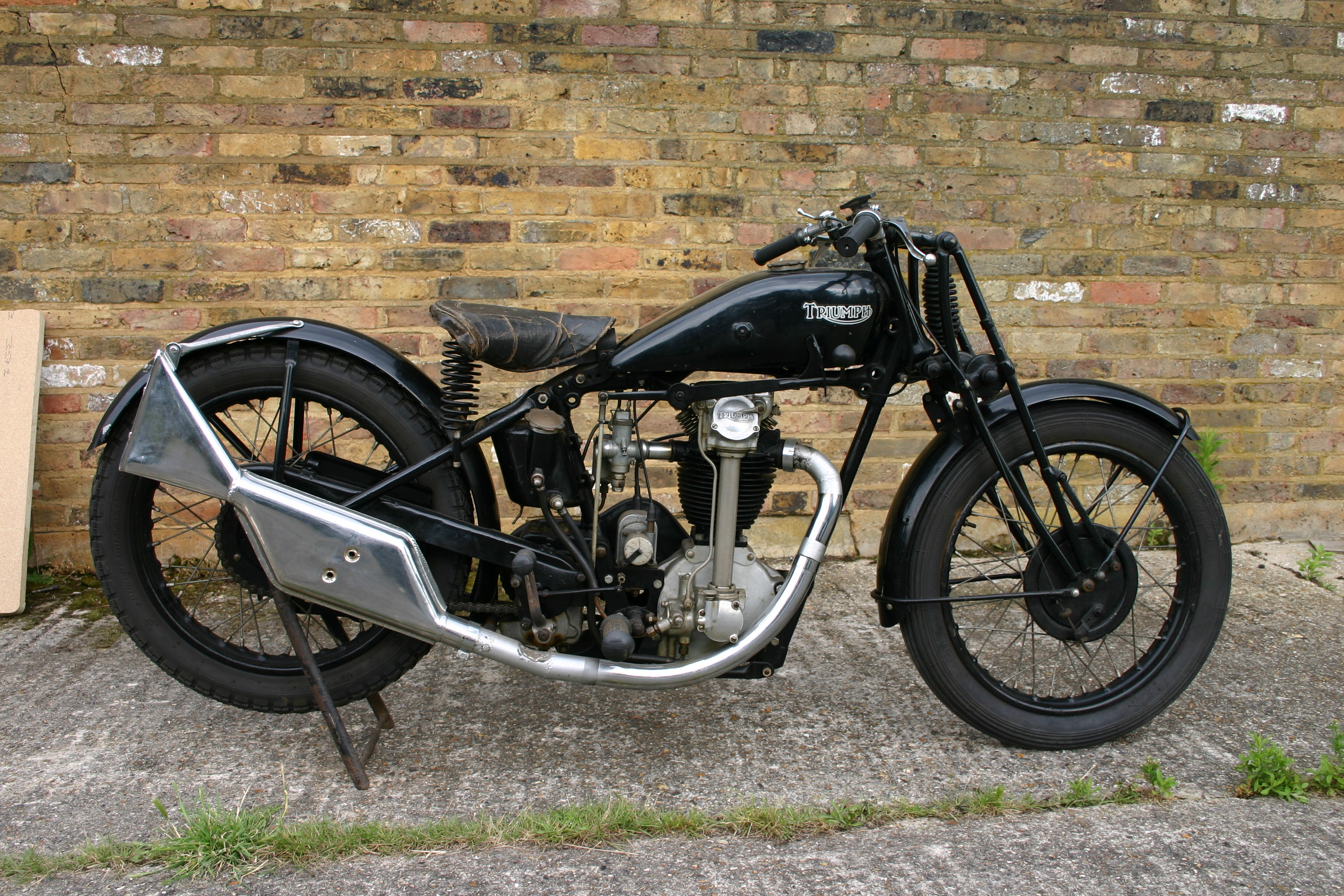
1929 Triumph prototype with bevel-gear OHC

When the Great Depression began in 1929, Triumph sold its German subsidiary as a separate, independently owned company, which later merged with the Adler company to become Triumph-Adler. The Nuremberg company continued to manufacture motorcycles as TWN (Triumph Werke Nürnberg) until 1957. In 1932, Triumph sold another part of the company, its bicycle manufacturing facility to Raleigh Bicycle Company. By then, Triumph had been struggling financially, and Bettmann had been forced out of the job of chairman. He retired completely in 1933.

In 1936, the company's two components became separate companies. Triumph always struggled to make a profit from cars, and after becoming bankrupt was in 1945 acquired by the Standard Motor Company. The motorcycle operations fared better, having been acquired in 1936 by Jack Sangster, who also owned the rival Ariel motorcycle company. That same year, the company began its first exports to the United States, which quickly grew into the company's single most important market. Sangster formed the Triumph Engineering Co Ltd. largely directed by ex-Ariel employees, including Edward Turner who designed the 500 cc 5T Triumph Speed Twin—released in September 1937, and the basis for all Triumph twins until the 1980s. Contrary to popular belief, however, this was not Triumph's first parallel twin. The first was the Val Page designed model 6/1, introduced in 1933. This first twin performed well as a racer but was ultimately unpopular with the public and did not sell well. After Turner arrived, with his usual brusque manner, the 6/1 ended, later to be replaced with Turner's design. The 6/1 engine tooling was also scrapped. In 1939, the 500 cc Tiger T100, capable of 100 miles per hour (160 km/h), was released, and then the war began.

== Second World War ==
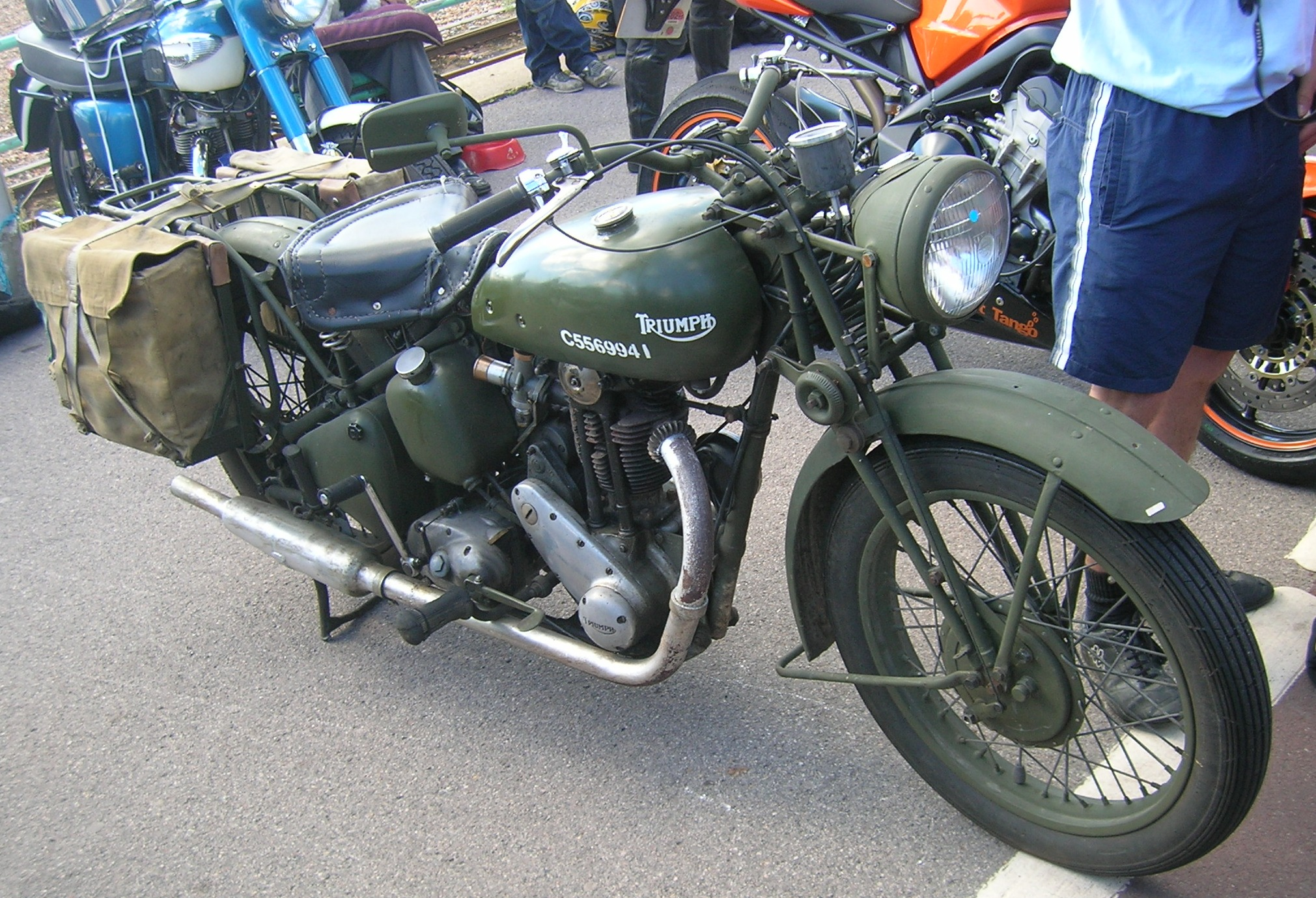
Triumph 3HW 350cc single made at Meriden from 1942

Motorcycles were produced at Coventry until the Second World War. The city of Coventry was virtually destroyed in the Coventry Blitz (7 September 1940 to May 1941). Tooling and machinery was recovered from the site of the devastation and production restarted at the new plant at Meriden, Warwickshire in 1942.

== Post-war era ==
The Triumph Speed Twin designed by Edward Turner before the war was produced in large numbers after the war. Efforts to settle the Lend-Lease debts caused nearly 70% of Triumph's post-war production to be shipped to the United States. Post war, the Speed Twin and Triumph Tiger 100 were available with a sprung rear hub, Triumph's first attempt at a rear suspension.

Privateers put wartime surplus aluminium alloy barrels on their Tiger 100 racers, and won races, inspiring the Triumph GP model. By 1950 the supply of barrels was exhausted, and the GP model was ended. The American market applied considerable demand to reverse this action, and a die-cast close finned aluminium alloy barrel was made available. The aluminium alloy head made the valve noise more obvious, so ramp type cams were introduced for aluminium alloy head models to reduce the noise.

Another motorcycle based on the wartime generator engine was the 498 cc TR5 Trophy Twin, also introduced at the 1948 Motor Cycle Show. It used a single carburettor, low compression version of the Grand Prix engine. Britain won the prestigious 1948 International Six Days Trial. The Triumph works team had finished unpenalised. One team member, Allan Jefferies, had been riding what amounted to a prototype version.

To satisfy the American demand for motorcycles suited to long-distance riding, Turner built a 650 cc version of the Speed Twin design. The new bike was named the Thunderbird (a name Triumph would later license to the Ford Motor Company for use for a car model). Only one year after the Thunderbird was introduced, a motorcyclist in Southern California mated the 650 Thunderbird with a twin carb head intended originally for GP racing and named the new creation the Wonderbird. That 650 cc motor, designed in 1939, had the world's absolute speed record for motorcycles from 1955 until 1970.

The Triumph brand received considerable publicity in the United States when Marlon Brando rode a 1950 Thunderbird 6T in the 1953 film, The Wild One.

The Triumph Motorcycle concern was sold to their rivals BSA by Sangster in 1951. This sale included Sangster becoming a member of the BSA board. Sangster was to become Chairman of the BSA Group in 1956.

The production 650 cc Thunderbird (6T) was a low-compression tourer, and the 500 cc Tiger 100 was the performance motorcycle. That changed in 1954, with the change to swing arm frames, and the release of the aluminium alloy head 650 cc Tiger 110, eclipsing the 500 cc Tiger 100 as the performance model.

In 1959, the T120, a tuned double carburettor version of the Triumph Tiger T110, came to be known as the Bonneville. As Triumph and other marques gained market share, Harley became aware that their 1-litre-plus motorcycles were not as sporty as modern riders would like, resulting in a decreasing share of the market. The Triumphs were models for a new, "small" Harley-Davidson as a result: the now-fabled Harley-Davidson Sportster, which started as Harley's version of a Triumph Bonneville. With its anachronistic V-twin, the Sportster was no match for the Bonneville, but it proved a solid competitor in US sales and eventually also in longevity.

During the 1960s, despite internal opposition from those who believed that it would reduce the macho image of the brand, Triumph produced two scooters; the Triumph Tina, a small and low-performance 2-stroke scooter of about 100 cc with automatic clutch and a handlebar carry basket, and the Triumph Tigress, a more powerful scooter available with either a 175 cc 2-stroke single or a 250 cc 4-stroke twin engine for the enthusiast.

In 1962, the last year of the "pre-unit" models, Triumph used a frame with twin front down-tubes, but returned to a traditional Triumph single front downtube for the unit construction models that ensued. The twin down tube, or duplex frame, was used for the 650 twins, as a result of frame fractures on the Bonneville. Introduced in 1959, for the 1960 model year, it soon needed strengthening, and was ended in 1962, with the advent of the unit engines for the 650 range. The 3TA (21) was the first unit construction twin, soon followed by the short-stroke, 490 cc "500" range.

From 1963 all Triumph engines were of unit construction.

In 1969 Malcolm Uphill, riding a Bonneville, won the Isle of Man Production TT race with a race average of 99.99 miles per hour (160.92 km/h) per lap, and recorded the first ever more than 100 miles per hour (161 km/h) lap by a production motorcycle at 100.37 miles per hour (161.53 km/h). For many Triumph fans, the 1969 Bonneville was the best Triumph model ever.

American sales had already maximised, in 1967. In truth, the demand for motorcycles was increasing, but Triumph could not supply the demand.

During the 1960s, 60% of all Triumph production was exported, which, along with the BSA's 80% exports, made the group susceptible to the Japanese expansion. By 1969 fully 50% of the US market for motorcycles more than 500 cc belonged to Triumph, but technological advances at Triumph had failed to match those of the foreign companies. Triumphs lacked electric start mechanisms, relied on push-rods rather than overhead cams, vibrated noticeably, often leaked oil and had antiquated electrical systems; while Japanese marques such as Honda were building more advanced features into attractive new motorcycles that sold for less than their British competitors. Triumph motorcycles, as a result, were nearly obsolete even when they were new. Further, Triumph's manufacturing processes were very labour-intensive and largely inefficient. Also disastrous, during the early 1970s the US government mandated that all motorcycle imports must have their gearshift and brake pedals in the Japanese configuration, which required expensive retooling of all the motorcycles for US sale.

Triumph and BSA were well aware of Honda's ability, with Honda winning motorcycle world championships since 1961, racing in Formula One, and offering the Honda CB450 twin since 1965, but while the Japanese were only making smaller engined models, the large engine market was considered safe. When the first Honda CB750 cc four cylinder was released for sale to the public in 1969, Triumph and BSA had trouble. Despite developing and releasing a 3-cylinder 750 cc engined motorcycle prior to the Japanese fours—the BSA Rocket 3/Triumph Trident—the Japanese bikes were praised in the press for their modernity (disc brakes, 4-cylinder engines, leak-free engine casings, etc.). The British triples outperformed the Japanese fours (top speed, acceleration and handling) but the Japanese fours required less maintenance and they did not leak.

The 1970 Tiger/Bonneville re-design and taller twin front downtube oil tank frame had a mixed reception from Triumph enthusiasts at the time, and was insufficient to win back those already riding the Japanese bikes that had been sold since 1969—the Honda 750 Four, and the Kawasaki 500 Mach 3. The Triumph 350 cc Bandit received pre-publicity, but its development was quietly brought to an end. Triumph was still making motorcycles, but they no longer looked like the motorcycles Triumph fans expected. The Trident attracted its own market, but the Japanese motorcycles were improving more rapidly.

The parent BSA group had losses of £8.5 million in 1971, £3 million for BSA motorcycles alone. The British government became involved. The company was sold to Manganese Bronze Holdings, which also owned Norton, AJS, Matchless, Francis-Barnett, James-Velocette and Villiers.

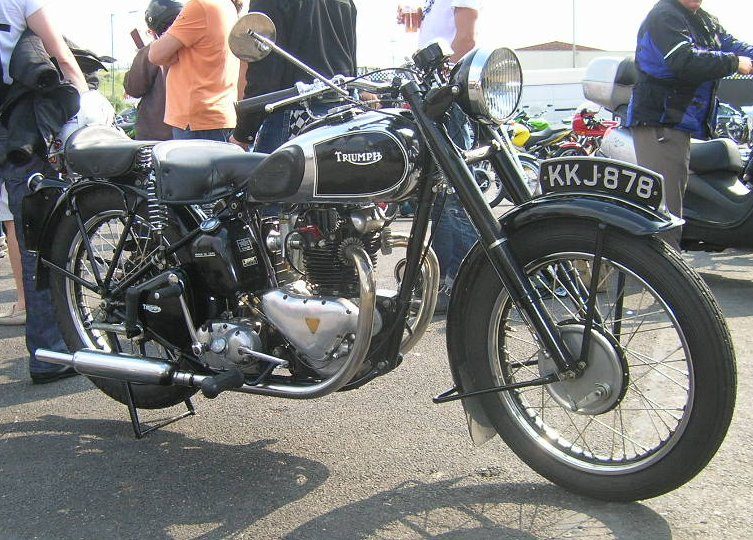
Triumph 3T. This short-lived post-war economy 350cc twin proved unnecessary with the Speed Twins and Thunderbirds selling so well.

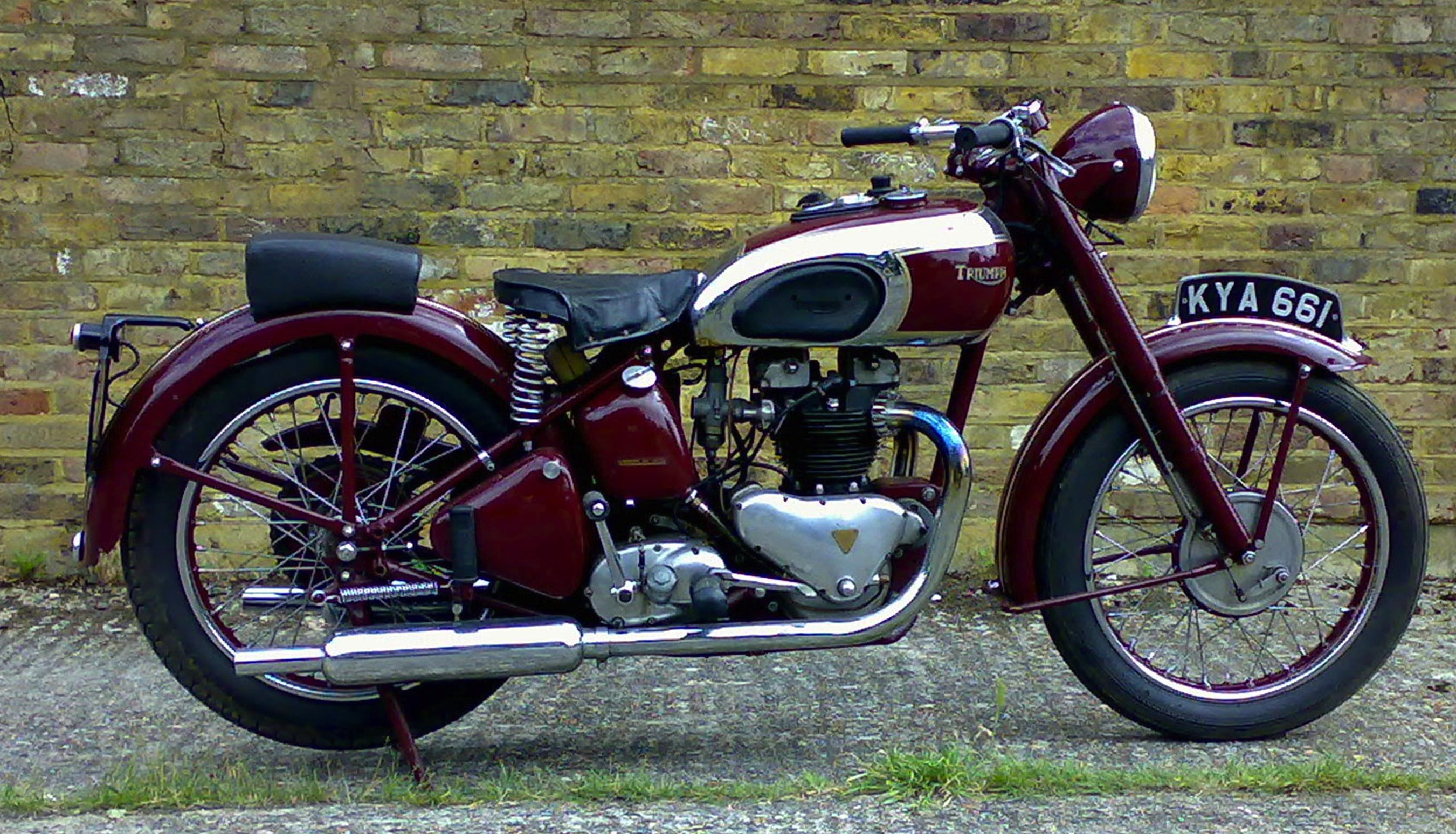
Triumph Speed Twin with telescopic front fork

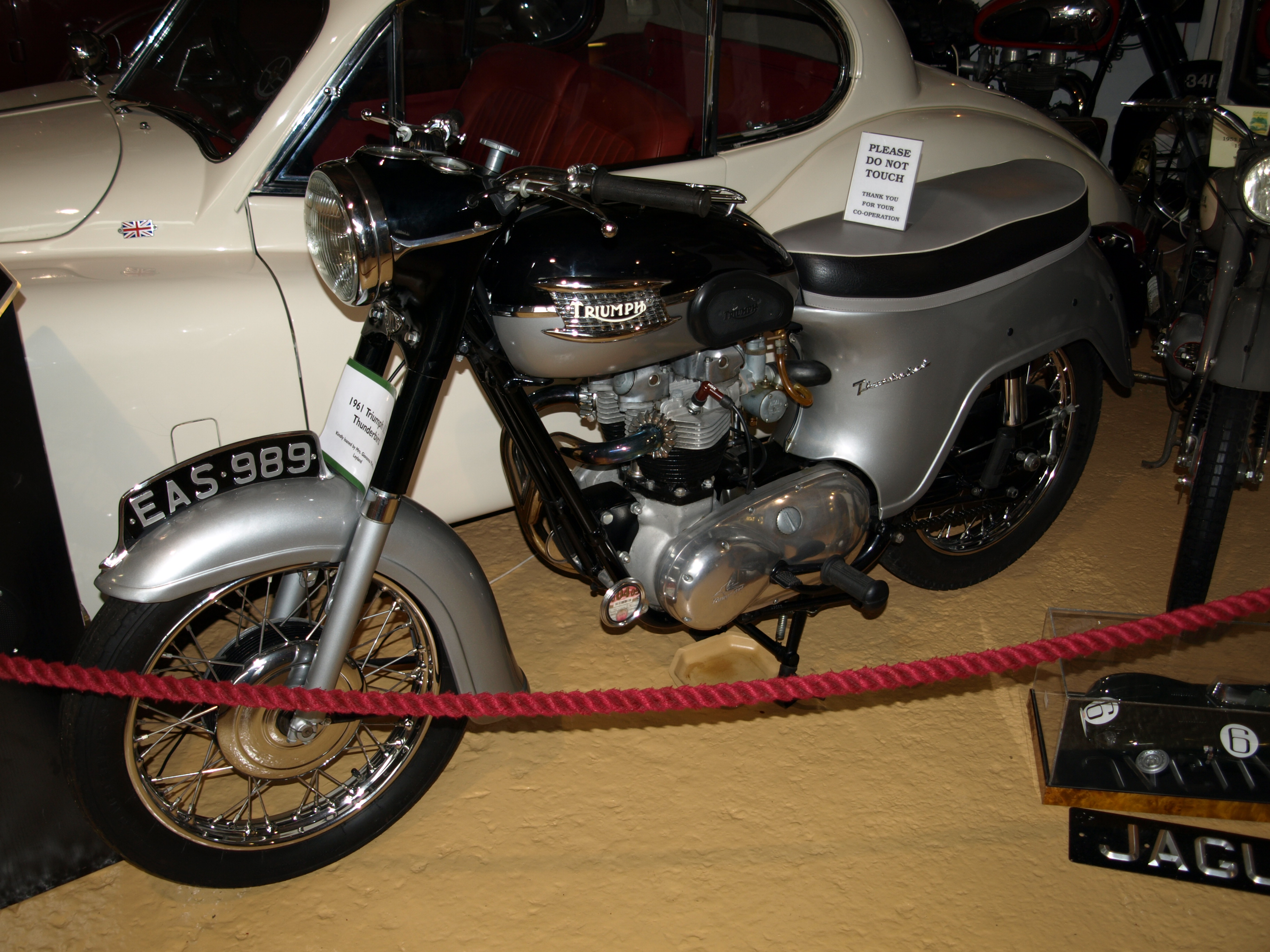
1964 Triumph Thunderbird with "bathtub" rear fairing and siamesed exhaust.

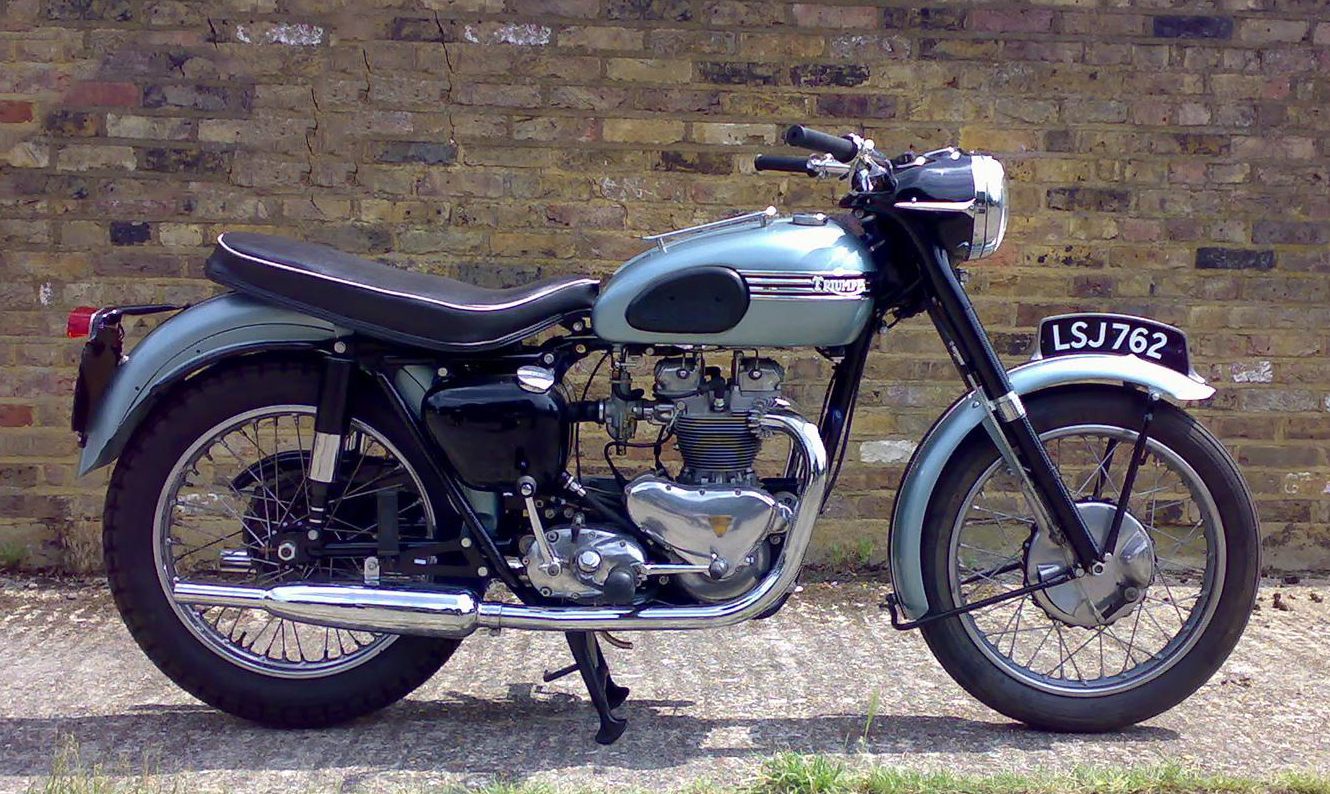
Triumph Tiger 100

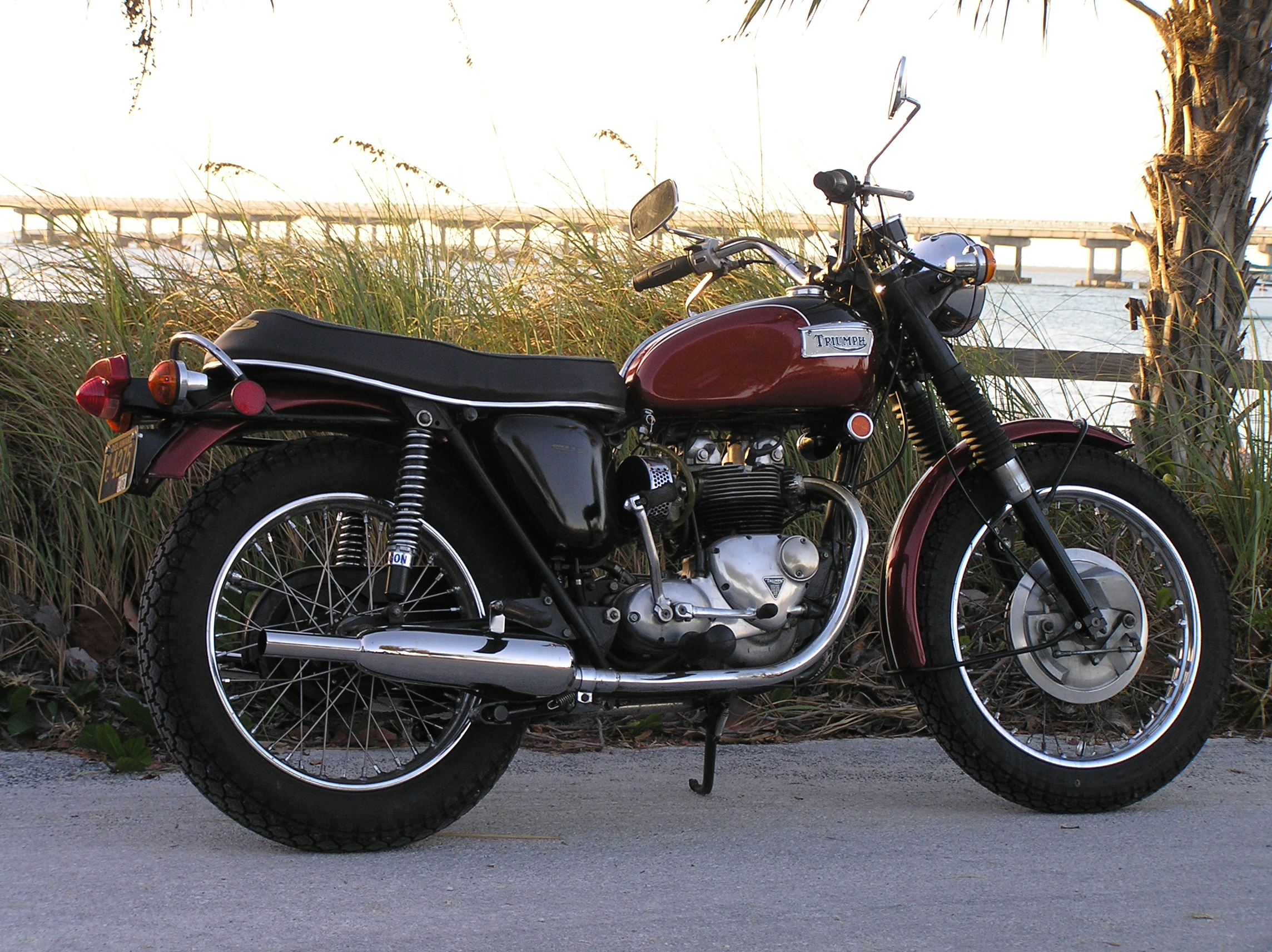
1971 Triumph Daytona

== Norton Villiers Triumph ==
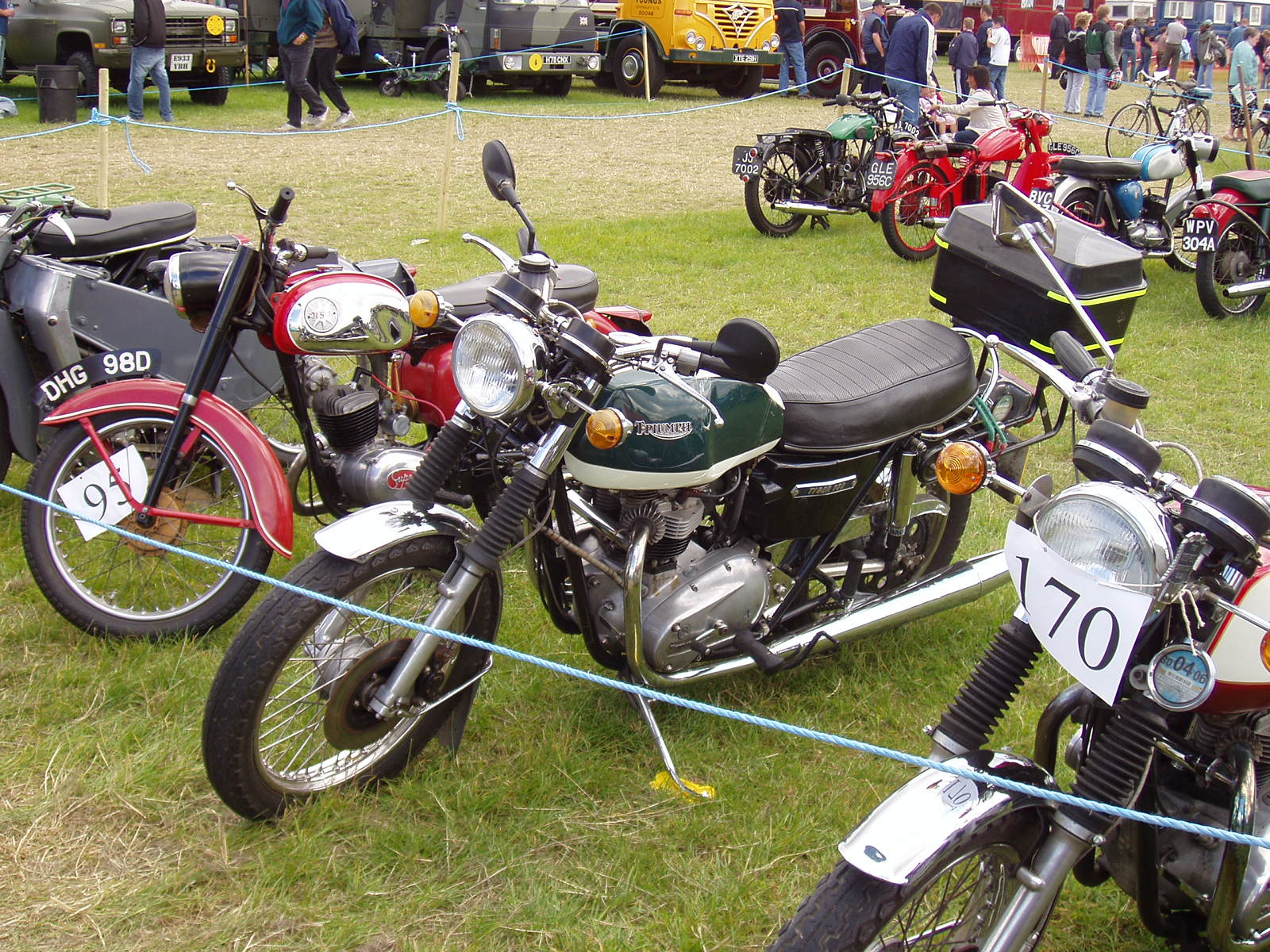
1976 750cc TR7V Tiger built for NVT by the Meriden cooperative

After the BSA group went bankrupt in 1972, Dennis Poore, the chairman of Norton-Villiers (a subsidiary of Manganese Bronze Holdings) was induced by government aid to assume control of BSA/Triumph. Norton and BSA/Triumph were merged under the umbrella of a new company, Norton Villiers Triumph (NVT) in 1972. Poore was made NVT Group chairman and put in charge, even though Norton had produced far fewer bikes than the once-mighty BSA/Triumph.

Poore then held consultations with factory personnel to propose consolidation plans he thought necessary to compete with the Japanese. In September 1973 he announced that the Meriden factory was to close in February 1974, with 3,000 employees out of 4,500 being made redundant.

== The Meriden Motorcycle Co-operative ==
Concerned about unemployment and losing their products to a rival factory, the workers at the Meriden factory demonstrated against the proposed relocation to the BSA site at Small Heath, Birmingham, and staged a sit-in for two years. With political aid of the newly elected Labour government and, in particular, the then minister for Trade and Industry, Tony Benn, the Meriden worker's co-operative was formed, supplying Triumph 750 cc motorcycles to its sole customer, NVT.

After the collapse of NVT in 1977, the co-operative bought the marketing rights for Triumph with more government loans, later becoming Triumph Motorcycles (Meriden) Limited. The venture, with only two 750 cc models, the Bonneville and Tiger, started well with a successful variant, the 1977 Silver Jubilee Bonneville T140J and by 1978 was the best selling European motorcycle in the vital USA market.

Emissions compliant models during 1978 and 1979 such as the aluminium alloy-wheeled Triumph T140D Bonneville Special and T140E Bonneville were introduced to the dominant USA market, but the strong British pound made these bikes prohibitively expensive and they failed to sell in significant numbers. Moreover, despite updates such as electric starting and a faired Triumph Bonneville Executive T140EX with luggage, by 1980 Meriden's debt was £2 million—in addition to the earlier £5 million loan. In October 1980, the new Conservative British government wrote off £8.4 million owed but still left the company owing £2 million to Britain's Export Credits Guarantee Department.

Meriden introduced several new models such as the dual purpose TR7T Tiger Trail and budget 650 cc Triumph TR65 Thunderbird during its last years but none were able to stop the decline, worsened by a UK recession and a continuing strong pound harming sales to the US. However, the Triumph Royal Wedding T140LE Bonneville celebrating the Prince of Wales' nuptials was a popular collector's item for 1981 and that year a 750 cc TR7T Tiger Trail won the Rallye des Pyrénées on/off-road rally. Large orders for police motorcycles from Nigeria and Ghana were won at critical moments thereby saving the firm during 1979 and 1982 respectively. 1982 was the last year of "full" production, with the custom-styled Triumph T140 TSX and 8-valve Triumph T140W TSS model initiated—although a porous cylinder head made by external contractors and insufficient development quickly eroded the latter's initial market popularity.

In 1983, the debt-ridden company briefly considered buying the bankrupt Hesketh Motorcycles, and even badged one as a marketing trial. Despite also touting a 900cc prototype water-cooled twin at the 1983 National Exhibition Show to attract outside investment, Triumph Motorcycles (Meriden) Ltd itself became bankrupt on 23 August 1983.

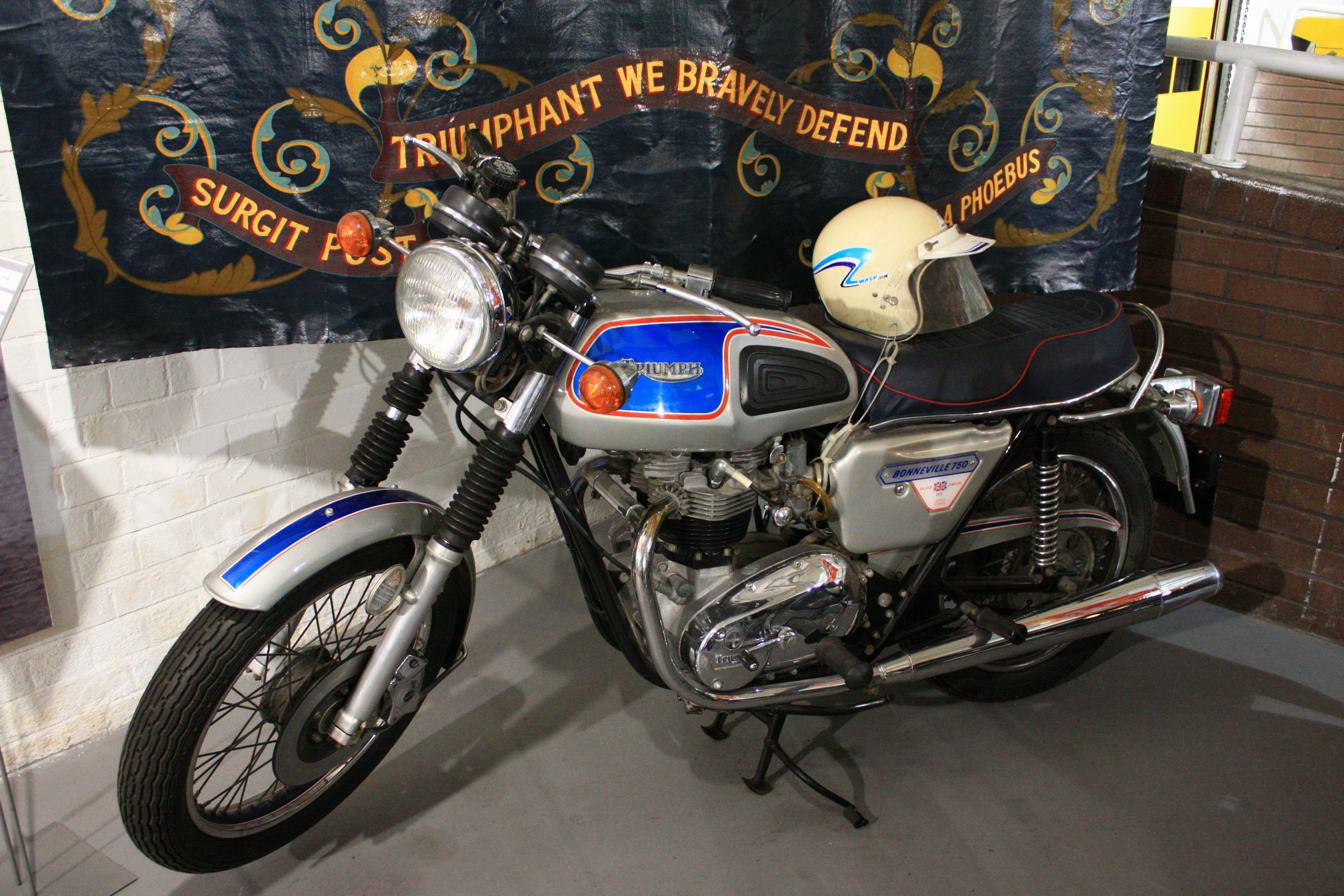
A special edition 750cc Triumph Silver Jubilee T140J.

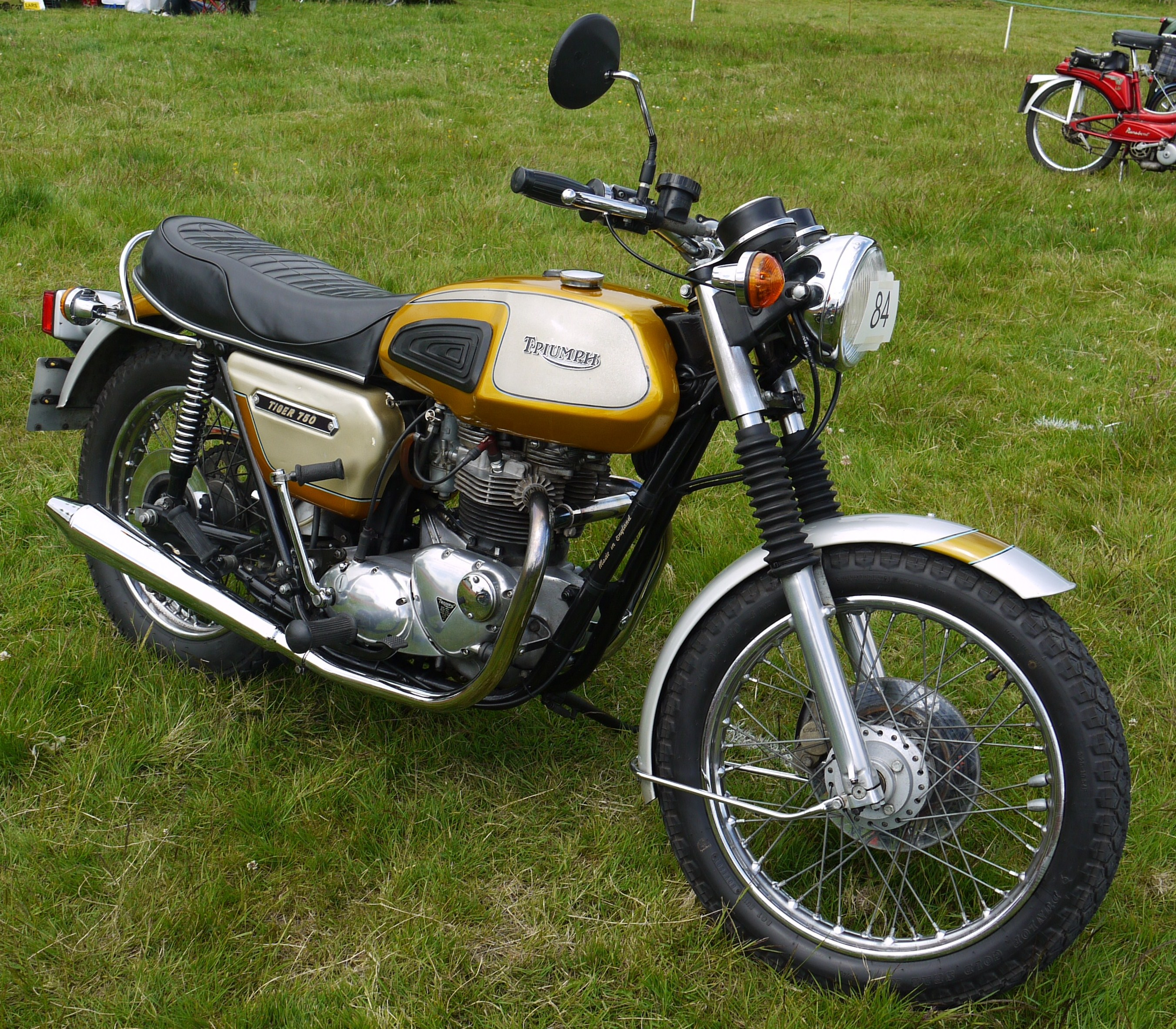
1977 Triumph TR7V Tiger with aftermarket reverse-cone silencers

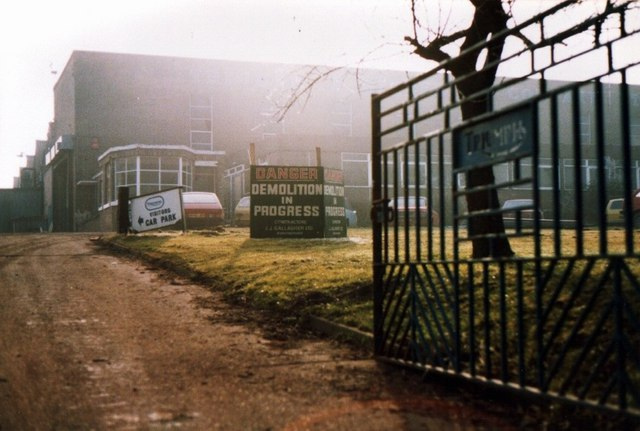
Demolition of the Triumph Factory at Meriden in 1984

== Triumph Motorcycles (Hinckley) Ltd ==
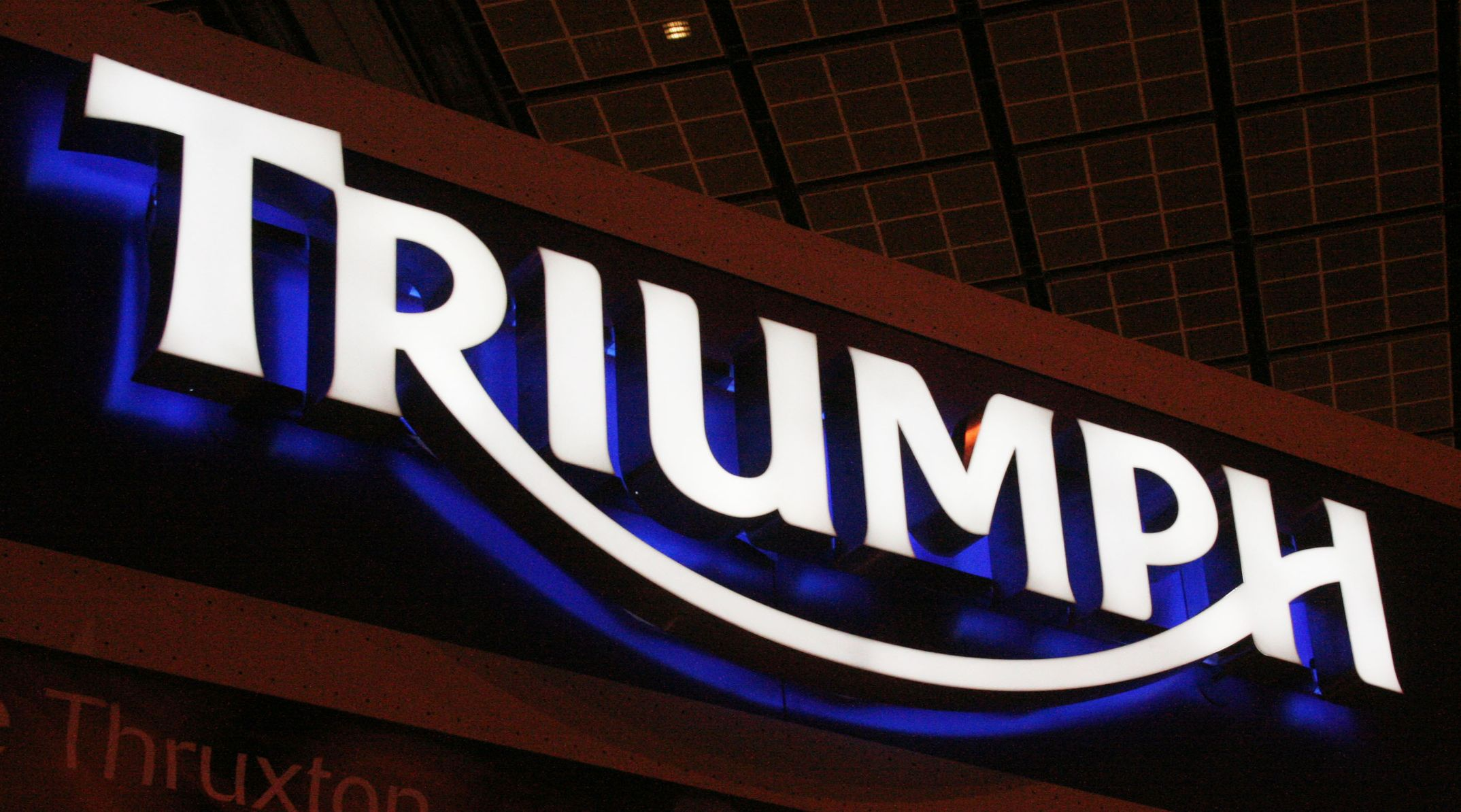

Triumph Motorcycles (Hinckley) Ltd is the largest surviving British motorcycle manufacturer. When Triumph went into receivership in 1983, John Bloor, a former plasterer who acquired his wealth from building and property development, became interested in keeping the brand alive, and bought the name and manufacturing rights from the Official Receiver. The new company, initially Bonneville Coventry Ltd, ensured that Triumph has produced motorcycles since 1902, winning it the title of the world's second longest continuous production motorcycle manufacturer, one year behind Royal Enfield. A licensing agreement granted to pattern spares manufacturer, Les Harris, kept the Triumph Bonneville in production until Triumph initiated a new range during 1990 and 1991. Triumph now makes a range of motorcycles reviving model names of the past, including a newly designed Bonneville twin.

== See also ==
- List of Triumph motorcycles
- Triumph Motor Company—cars
- Triumph Cycle Co. Ltd. of Nottingham, England, manufactured bicycles.
- Triumph Owners Motor Cycle Club
- Edward Turner
