= Slippery Sam =

Racing motorcycle

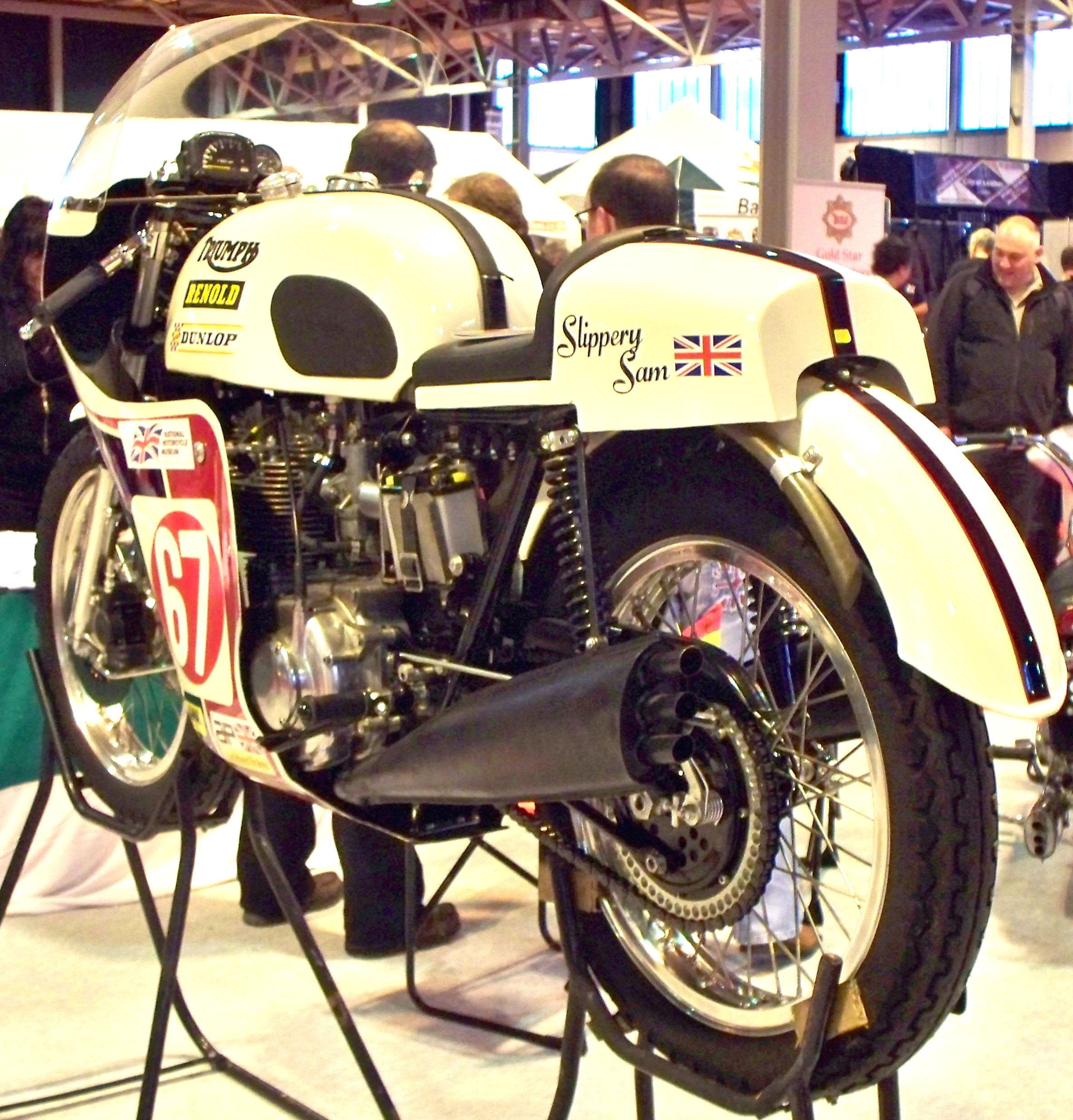
Slippery Sam, a roadster prepared for production-class road racing to controlled specifications using selected adaptations only, available from the factory as part-numbered inventory, seen exhibited at a UK Classic Car and Bike Show in 2009 wearing a Dunlop TT100 rear tyre

Slippery Sam is a British production class racing motorcycle from the early 1970s that used a carefully prepared version of the 750 cc Triumph Trident ohv (pushrod) three-cylinder engine. The "Slippery Sam" name was acquired during the 1970 Bol d'Or, a 24-hour race for production-based machines held in France, when engine difficulties and escaping oil covered the bike of Triumph employee Percy Tait and co-rider Steve Jolly who managed to finish in fifth place to winners Paul Smart and Tom Dickie on another works Trident.

'Slippery Sam' is known for winning five consecutive production 750 cc class TT races at the Isle of Man between 1971 and 1975. The machine, which was displayed at the National Motorcycle Museum, was destroyed in a fire during 2003, but has since been completely rebuilt.

== History ==
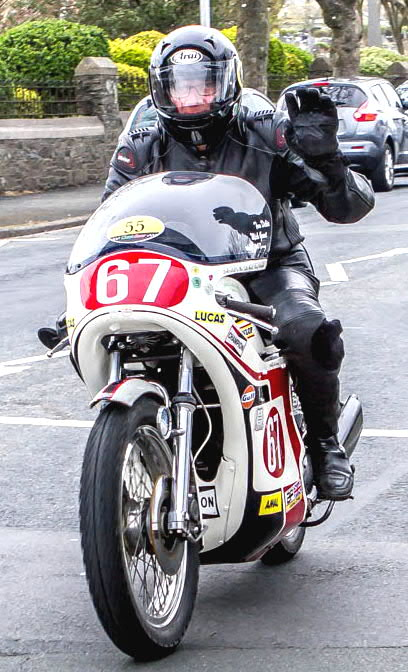
A Slippery Sam replica, part of a tribute ride-out following Geoff Duke's funeral cortege leaving from the TT Grandstand, Isle of Man, in 2015

"Slippery Sam" was one of three similar motorcycles initially built by Triumph built for the 1970 Isle of Man Production TT. The bike was created by the engine's designer, Doug Hele, who joined with frame expert Rob North to produce the successful works Formula 750 race bikes. One of these was ridden by Malcolm Uphill, who won the TT at 97.71 mph (157.25 km/h). Other riders included Mick Grant; and in 1971 Percy Tait and Ray Pickrell won the Bol d'Or 24-hour endurance race on a Triumph triple. The motorcycles were prepared for races by Les Williams and his team. (Williams went on to develop the Triumph Legend 964cc).

In 1974, racer and journalist Ray Knight stated in UK magazine Motorcyclist Illustrated "Isn't it amazing how the evergreen Trident 'Slippery Sam' keeps on winning the big production races? For the last four years that bike has had enough performance to blow everything else into the weeds. Not just mph but sheer 'bikeability', now part of current jargon and defined as the optimum combination of handling, braking and torque characteristics that makes it a winner".

== F750 racer ==
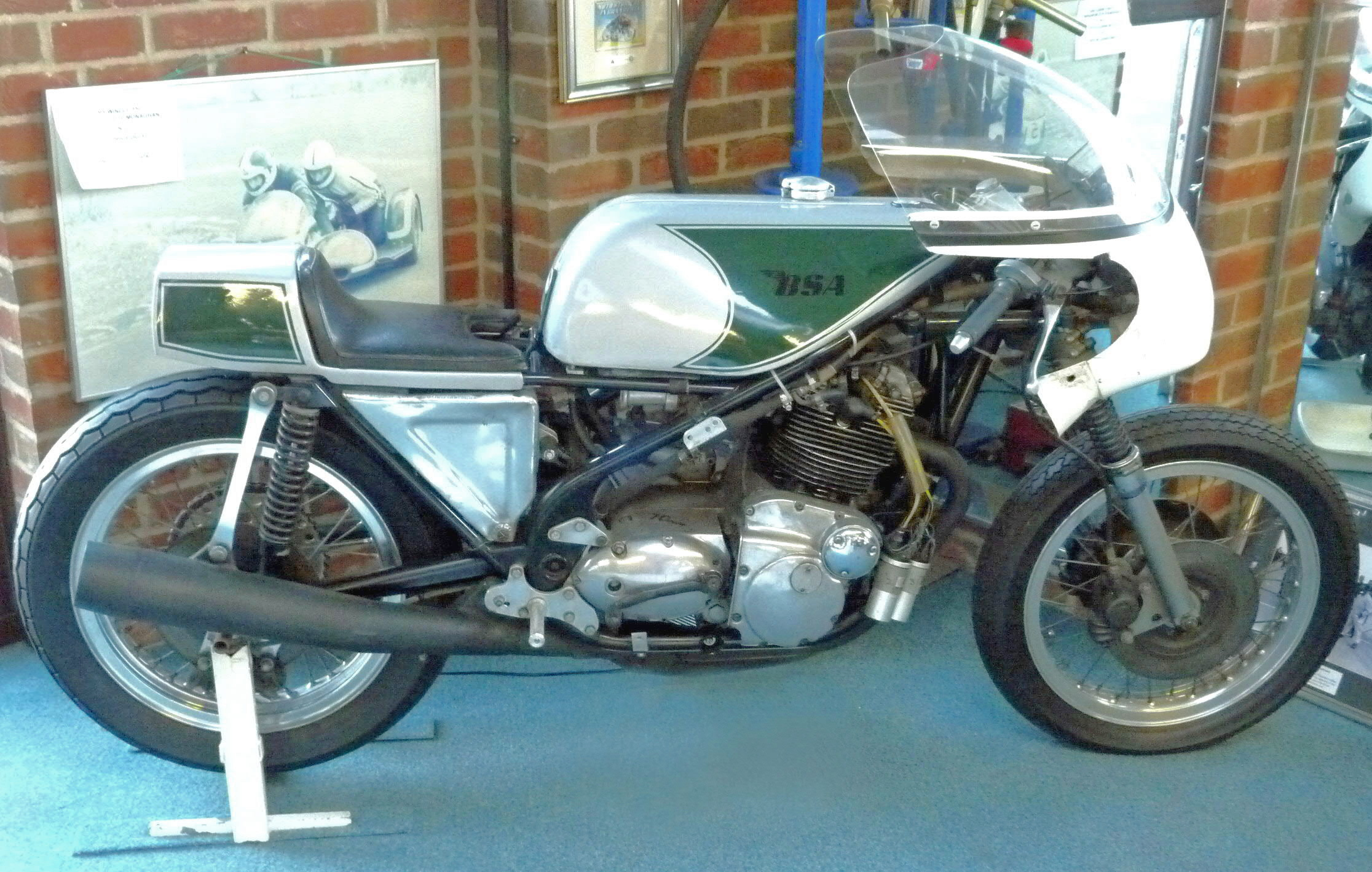
Rob North framed BSA Rocket 3 F750 class at the Sammy Miller Museum

Bert Hopwood urged BSA's managers to make a production version of the racing triple, producing 84 bhp (63 kW) at 8,250 rpm – but this suggestion was ignored, partly due to financial concerns.

Further racing development in the USA was carried out at the Duarte, California, facility under Racing Manager Dan Macias. USA BSA/Triumph dealers had access to factory race parts, but due to difficulties in obtaining race frames from the UK, Macias built his own jig and the frames were manufactured by Wenco. The main differences from the factory North frames were TIG welding instead of brazed, flat plate rear engine mounts instead of built-up formed sheet and 4130 Cro-Mo steel material. Dick Mann's win at the 1971 Daytona 200 was on a US specification bike.

== F750 Specifications ==
Engine	Three cylinder, four stroke
Displacement	750 cc
Bore & Stroke	67mm x 70mm
Valvetrain	twin camshaft ohv (pushrod), 2 valve
Compression ratio	
Maximum power	84 bhp (63 kW) at 8,250 rpm
Maximum torque	
Oil system	Dry sump
Cooling system	air cooled
Transmission	Five speed
Drivetrain	Chain
Brakes	Front: twin disc Rear: single disc
Dry weight	
