= 1970 Isle of Man TT =

Annual motorcycle racing event

The 1970 Isle of Man TT, the fourth round of the 1970 Grand Prix motorcycle racing season, involved a number of races on the Mountain Course on the Isle of Man. For the third consecutive year, Giacomo Agostini won both the Junior and Senior races, completing the six laps of the latter race in 2:13.47.6 to win by over five minutes. There were three "production" categories; Malcolm Uphill won the 750 cc Class after Peter Williams (Norton) ran out of petrol while leading the race, allowing Uphill to pass him mere yards from the finish line. Frank Whiteway won the 500 cc Class and Chas Mortimer the 250 cc Class. German pairs won both sidecar events; Klaus Enders and Wolfgang Kalauch in the 500 cc and Siegfried Schauzu and H. Schneider in the 750 cc. Kel Carruthers won the Lightweight 250 cc race, while Dieter Braun won the Lightweight 125 cc. Braun's victory was notable because he was one of only seven riders to have won an Isle of Man TT race in their first attempt. Due to the circuit's 37.7 mile length, it usually takes competitors two or three attempts before they learn its nuances.

There were six fatalities among the competitors, including world championship contender Santiago Herrero, making this the deadliest year in the history of the Isle of Man TT.

== 1970 Isle of Man Production 750 cc TT final standings ==
5 Laps (188.56 Miles) Mountain Course.

Rank	Rider	Number	cc	Machine	Cylinders	Speed	Time
1	(United Kingdom) Malcolm Uphill	1	649cc	Triumph T.120	Twin	97.71 mph	1:55.51.0
2	(United Kingdom) Peter Williams	18	746cc	Norton Commando	Twin	97.69 mph	1:55.52.6
3	(United Kingdom) Ray Pickrell	12	745cc	Dunstall Norton	Twin	95.86 mph	1:58.05.2
4	(United Kingdom) Tom Dickie			Triumph		94.14 mph	2:00.15.0
5	(United Kingdom) Bob Heath	5	741cc	BSA Rocket Three	Three	94.09 mph	2:00.19.0
6	(West Germany) Hans-Otto Butenuth	17	745cc	BMW R75/5	Twin	93.54 mph	2:01.01.8
7	(United Kingdom) Steve Spencer	2	745cc	Norton Atlas	Twin	93.18 mph	2:01.29.2
8	(Northern Ireland) Tommy H. Robb	11	736cc	Honda CB750	Four	92.26 mph	2:02.42.0
9	(United Kingdom) John Cooper	6	736cc	Honda CB750	Four	91.32 mph	2:03.57.6
10	(United Kingdom) Pat Mahoney			Norton		89.77 mph	2:06.06.0
11	(United Kingdom) Tom Armstrong	33	746cc	Norton Commando	Twin	85.62 mph	2:12.13.8
12	Martyn Ashwood			Triumph		85.61 mph	2:12.14.2
DNF	(Northern Ireland) Brian Steenson	10	741cc	BSA Rocket Three	Three	-	DNF
DNF	(United Kingdom) Robin Duffty	14	649cc	Triumph T.120	Twin	-	DNF
DNF	(United Kingdom) Darryl Pendlebury	23	668cc	Triumph Bonneville	Twin	-	DNF
DNF	(United Kingdom) Gerald Carter	37	649cc	Triumph T.120	Twin	-	DNF
DNF	(United Kingdom) Alan Barnett			Triumph		-	DNF
DNF	(United Kingdom) Paul A Smart	3	741cc	Triumph Trident	Three	-	DNF
DNF	(United Kingdom) Tony Jefferies	19	668cc	Triumph Bonneville	Twin	-	DNF
DNF	(United Kingdom) Billie Nelson	15	746cc	Norton Commando	Twin	-	DNF
DNF	(United Kingdom) George Fogarty	20	746cc	Norton Commando	Twin	-	DNF
DNF	(United Kingdom) A.D.Carlton	36	746cc	Norton Commando	Twin	-	DNF
DNF	(United Kingdom) Martin Carney	26	741cc	Triumph Trident	Three	-	DNF
DNF	(United Kingdom) Doug Cash	34	746cc	Norton Commando	Twin	-	DNF
DNF	(United Kingdom) Peter Darvill	30	736cc	Honda CB750	Four	-	DNF
DNF	(United Kingdom) David Nixon	31	649cc	Triumph T.120	Twin	-	DNF

== 1970 Isle of Man Production 500 cc TT final standings ==
5 Laps (188.56 Miles) Mountain Course.

Rank	Rider	Number	cc	Machine	Cylinders	Speed	Time
1	(United Kingdom) Frank Whiteway	41	492cc	Suzuki T500 II	Twin	89.94 mph	2:05.52.0
2	(United Kingdom) Gordon Pantall	54	490cc	Triumph Daytona	Twin	88.90 mph	2:07.20.0
3	(United Kingdom) Ray Knight	44	490cc	Triumph Daytona	Twin	88.89 mph	2:07.20.4
4	(United Kingdom) Ron Baylie	42	490cc	Triumph Daytona	Twin	87.58 mph	2:09.15.0
5	(United Kingdom) Graham Penny	40	444cc	Honda CB450 / Triumph	Twin	86.70 mph	2:10.34.4
6	(United Kingdom) Jeffrey Wade	53	492cc	Suzuki T500 II	Twin	85.31 mph	2:12.42.0
7	(United Kingdom) Brian Finch	51	499cc	Velocette Thruxton	Single	83.86 mph	2:14.59.0
DNF	(United Kingdom) Mick Chatterton	49	490cc	Triumph Daytona	Twin	-	DNF
DNF	(United Kingdom) Hugh Evans	48	499cc	BSA A50	Twin	-	DNF
DNF	(United Kingdom) Paul Coombs	50	490cc	Triumph Daytona	Twin	-	DNF
DNF	(Australia) Barry Smith			Honda		-	DNF

== 1970 Isle of Man Production 250 cc TT final standings ==
5 Laps (188.56 Miles) Mountain Course.

Rank	Rider	Number	cc	Machine	Cylinders	Speed	Time
1	(United Kingdom) Charles "Chas" S.Mortimer	60	248cc	Ducati Mark III D	Single	84.87 mph	2:13.23.4
2	(United Kingdom) John Williams	45		Honda		84.80 mph	2:13.29.0
3	(United Kingdom) Stan Woods	61	247cc	Suzuki T250 Hustler	Twin	84.06 mph	2:14.40.6
4	(United Kingdom) Graham Hunter	73	248cc	Ducati Mark III D	Single	83.94 mph	2:14.52.4
5	(United Kingdom) Roy W.Boughey	69	249cc	Honda CB 250	Twin	82.26 mph	2:17.37.6
6	(United Kingdom) Raymond Ashcroft	76	249cc	Honda CB 250	Twin	76.59 mph	2:27.48.8
7	(United Kingdom) Tom Loughridge	70	247cc	Suzuki T20	Twin	76.32 mph	2:28.19.0
8	(United Kingdom) Clive K.Luton	78	249cc	Ducati Mach I	Single	72.50 mph	2:36.08.0
DNF	(United Kingdom) Danny Shimmin	63	247cc	Suzuki T20	Twin	-	DNF
DNF	(United Kingdom) Malcolm Kirwan	79	244cc	Bultaco Metralla	Single	-	DNF
DNF	(United Kingdom) Bill Robertson	72	247cc	Suzuki T20	Twin	-	DNF
DNF	(United Kingdom) Roger Corbett	71	247cc	Cotton Conquest	Single	-	DNF
DNF	(United Kingdom) Jim Curry	62	249cc	Honda CB 250	Twin	-	DNF
DNF	(United Kingdom) Lindsay S.Porter	68	247cc	Suzuki T20	Twin	-	DNF
DNF	(United Kingdom) Clive P.Thompsett	64	249cc	Ducati Mach I	Single	-	DNF

== 1970 Isle of Man Sidecar 750cc TT final standings ==
3 Laps (113.00 Miles) Mountain Course.

Rank	Riders	Number	cc	Machine Make	Cylinders	Speed	Time
1	(West Germany) Siegfried Schauzu/Horst Schneider	4	501cc	BMW	Twin	90.21 mph	1.15.18.0
2	(United Kingdom) Peter Brown/Mick Casey	2	744cc	BSA	Three	85.97 mph	1.19.00.4
3	(Isle of Man) E.H.Leece/John Molyneaux	18	725cc	LMS	Twin	81.02 mph	1.23.50.2
4	(United Kingdom) Bill Cooper/D B Argent	16	654cc	WEC	Twin	80.68 mph	1.24.11.8
5	(United Kingdom) Mick Horsepole/E MacPherson	15	668cc	Bingham Triumph	Twin	80.64 mph	1.24.14.2
6	(United Kingdom) A.J.Sansum/Alex MacFadzean	17	649cc	Triumph	Twin	79.58 mph	1.25.21.6
7	(United Kingdom) Mac Hobson/Geoff Atkinson	11	654cc	Windrick BSA	Twin	79.44 mph	1.25.30.6
8	(United Kingdom) A.Swindells/D.Bayer	43	750cc	Curley Atlas / Norton	Twin	79.02 mph	1.25.57.0
9	(United Kingdom) Roy S.Woodhouse/Doug J.Woodhouse	93	736cc	Honda	Four	78.39 mph	1.26.38.6
10	(United Kingdom) Peter Krukowski/Alistair Lewis	82	654cc	BSA	Twin	77.76 mph	1.27.21.0
11	(United Kingdom) M.S.Whitton/F.Haslam	94	654cc	Rumble BSA	Twin	77.49 mph	1:27.39.0
12	(United Kingdom) John Barker/Chris Emmins	88	649cc	Reynoldson Triumph	Twin	77.27 mph	1:27.54.0
13	(United Kingdom) T.Rudd/J.West	71	649cc	RWS Triumph	Twin	76.94 mph	1:28.17.4
14	(United Kingdom) Fred Hanks/Don Williams	54	654cc	BSA	Twin	75.48 mph	1:29.59.0
15	(United Kingdom) Derek R.Yorke/A.Poole	28	649cc	Triton	Twin	75.08 mph	1:30.28.4
16	(United Kingdom) Trevor J.Ireson/D.H.J.Lockett	58	650cc	ETY Triumph	Twin	75.05 mph	1:30.30.2
17	(United Kingdom) Roy Bell/J.Wetherell	40	654cc	Windrick BSA	Twin	74.96 mph	1:30.36.8
18	(United Kingdom) Fred B.Cornbill/Mike G.Tinkler	48	649cc	Triumph	Twin	74.96 mph	1:30.36.8
19	(United Kingdom) Mick D.Wortley/J.Wilson	61	740cc	MDW III	Three	74.90 mph	1:30.41.2
20	(United Kingdom) Peter Sheridan/P.Smith	81	654cc	BSA	Twin	74.85 mph	1:30.44.8
21	(United Kingdom) S.J.Downes/J.O.Harris	84	649cc	Triumph	Twin	73.76 mph	1:32.05.0
22	(United Kingdom) Keith Graham/G.J.Sewell	27	649cc	Triumph	Twin	73.15 mph	1:32.51.0
23	(Republic of Ireland) J.Coxon/Stephen Galligan	76	654cc	Rumble BSA	Twin	73.10 mph	1:32.55.2
24	(United Kingdom) Fred G.Lewin/Miss Lesley Broadley	97	750cc	Norton	Twin	72.14 mph	1:34.09.0
25	(United Kingdom) G.A.Bye/A.D.Lodge	29	650cc	ETY Triumph	Twin	71.70 mph	1:34.44.2
26	(United Kingdom) D.W.North/David R.Bickley	87	649cc	Greenwood Triumph	Twin	71.58 mph	1:34.53.2
27	(United Kingdom) Dave F.Dickinson/S.Cooper	53	750cc	BMW	Twin	70.77 mph	1:35.58.6
28	(United Kingdom) Derek Rumble/J.H.Graham	98	654cc	Rumble BSA	Twin	70.47 mph	1:36.23.8
29	(United Kingdom) Barrie R.Moran/Ken B.Moran	73	650cc	L&B Norton	Twin	70.43 mph	1:36.26.0
30	(United Kingdom) D.Bradford/R.Makepeace	90	750cc	Norton	Twin	70.06 mph	1:36.57.0
31	(United Kingdom) R.J.Beales/Mrs. J.R.Beales	99	649cc	Triumph	Twin	68.86 mph	1:38.38.8
32	(United Kingdom) A.W.J.Teasdale/Nick Boret	50	706cc	RGM Triumph	Twin	67.62 mph	1:40.27.4
33	(United Kingdom) R.C.Smith/Ian Forrest	41	649cc	Triumph	Twin	67.58 mph	1:40.30.8
34	(United Kingdom) Brian Mee/P.F.Louis	89	654cc	BSA	Twin	65.89 mph	1:43.05.0
35	(United Kingdom) R.L.A.Cave/Roger Osbourne	62	649cc	Triumph	Twin	65.55 mph	1:43.37.0
36	(United Kingdom) Derek L.Plummer/Malcolm Brett	12	649cc	Kettle Triumph	Twin	61.75 mph	1:50.00.0
37	(United Kingdom) Jack Forrest/W.A.Forrest	39	654cc	BSA	Twin	61.19 mph	1:51.00.4
38	(United Kingdom) John Campbell/L.Mansfield	66	745cc	Campbell Norton	Twin	60.78 mph	1:51.45.0
DNF	(West Germany) Georg Auerbacher/Hermann Hahn	8	750cc	BMW	Twin	-	DNF
DNF	(United Kingdom) A.T.Baitup/P.Diprose	55	649cc	Triumph	Twin	-	DNF
DNF	(United Kingdom) E.B.Bardsley/P.R.Cropper	49	740cc	Triumph	Three	-	DNF
DNF	(United Kingdom) Mick E.Boddice/Clive Pollington	9	744cc	BSA	Three	-	DNF
DNF	(United Kingdom) John S.Brandon/Cliff A.Holland	26	736cc	JCLS	Four	-	DNF
DNF	(West Germany) Arneus Butscher/Karl Lauterbach	3	542cc	BMW	Twin	-	DNF
DNF	(United Kingdom) R.Cass/D.Jose	45	650cc	CJ Triumph	Twin	-	DNF
DNF	(United Kingdom) S.A.Clapham/J.R.Clapham	70	590cc	BMW	Twin	-	DNF
DNF	(United Kingdom) J.B.Crick/D.Senior	20	654cc	Windrick BSA	Twin	-	DNF
DNF	(United Kingdom) L.W.Currie/F.Kay	5	687cc	GSM	Twin	-	DNF
DNF	(United Kingdom) S.Digby/R.B.Haddrell	78	654cc	BSA	Twin	-	DNF
DNF	(United Kingdom) Roger Dutton/T.Hickford	42	654cc	BSA	Twin	-	DNF
DNF	(West Germany) Klaus Enders/Wolfgang Kalauch	6	750cc	BMW	Twin	-	DNF
DNF	(United Kingdom) I.Evans/J.Mathuson	64	750cc	IMP SPL	Four	-	DNF
DNF	(United Kingdom) R.M.W.Farrant/P.Dade	63	654cc	Vincent	Twin	-	DNF
DNF	(United Kingdom) Gordon Fox/Hugh Sanderson	19	649cc	Triumph	Twin	-	DNF
DNF	(United Kingdom) Charlie Freeman/Eddy Fletcher	34	750cc	Norton	Twin	-	DNF
DNF	(United Kingdom) Jeff B.Gawley/G.F.Alcock	67	654cc	BSA	Twin	-	DNF
DNF	(United Kingdom) A.Gillender/G.Simpson	75	650cc	GSS	Twin	-	DNF
DNF	(United Kingdom) R.G.Glover/J.Pennington	47	750cc	Norton	Twin	-	DNF
DNF	(United Kingdom) Keith S.Griffin/Malcolm Sharrocks	80	725cc	SG Triumph	Twin	-	DNF
DNF	(United Kingdom) Roy Hanks/Mrs. Rose Hanks	23	654cc	BSA	Twin	-	DNF
DNF	(United Kingdom) P.J.Hardcastle/R.Janes	30	705cc	Chuck-Triumph	Twin	-	DNF
DNF	(United Kingdom) Peter Hardy/Ron Hardy	32	650cc	HTS	Twin	-	DNF
DNF	(United Kingdom) T.Harris/B.L.Harris	36	649cc	Triumph	Twin	-	DNF
DNF	(United Kingdom) Dick J.Hawes/J.P.Mann	33	515cc	RGM Seeley	Single	-	DNF
DNF	(United Kingdom) M.A.Hunt/Colin C.Newbold	79	649cc	Triumph	Twin	-	DNF
DNF	(United Kingdom) Dennis Keen/G.C.Hunt	25	649cc	Triumph	Twin	-	DNF
DNF	(United Kingdom) Bob Kewley/J.Whiting	24	654cc	Rumble BSA	Twin	-	DNF
DNF	(United Kingdom) Ernie N.Lloyd/T.J.Harrington	95	649cc	Triumph	Twin	-	DNF
DNF	(United Kingdom) W.E.Lomas/C.Money	51	654cc	BSA	Twin	-	DNF
DNF	(West Germany) Heinz Luthringshauser/H.Cusnik	10	750cc	BMW	Twin	-	DNF
DNF	(United Kingdom) D.Maplethorpe/J.Coaten	74	649cc	Triumph	Twin	-	DNF
DNF	(United Kingdom) Ian McDonald/Andre Witherington	37	649cc	Triumph	Twin	-	DNF
DNF	(United Kingdom) J.Mines/G.Davis	35	740cc	Triumph	Three	-	DNF
DNF	(United Kingdom) Alan Moss/R.English	56	649cc	Triumph	Twin	-	DNF
DNF	(United Kingdom) Henry C.Munson/R.H.Ashenden	52	649cc	Triumph	Twin	-	DNF
DNF	(United Kingdom) George W.O'Dell/P.J.Stockdale	83	649cc	Triumph	Twin	-	DNF
DNF	(United Kingdom) Mick J.C.Potter/N.Panter	46	744cc	BSA / Triumph	Three	-	DNF
DNF	(United Kingdom) R.Powell/W.R.Boldison	77	649cc	PB Triumph	Twin	-	DNF
DNF	(United Kingdom) J.Renwick/P.Kennard	92	746cc	Vincent	Twin	-	DNF
DNF	(United Kingdom) G.R.Richards/W.E.Cooper	69	750cc	DBS	Twin	-	DNF
DNF	(United Kingdom) Steve J.Sinnott/Jim Williamson	21	750cc	SWS	Twin	-	DNF
DNF	(United Kingdom) C.Smith/James Law	59	654cc	BSA	Twin	-	DNF
DNF	(United Kingdom) R.Smith/R.Fiddes	60	649cc	Triumph	Twin	-	DNF
DNF	(United Kingdom) Mick Tombs/T.Tombs	31	654cc	BSA	Twin	-	DNF
DNF	(United Kingdom) B.R.Tomlins/P.T.Whiteside	68	654cc	BSA	Twin	-	DNF
DNF	(United Kingdom) Pete Tyack/P.Meehan	44	650cc	Reg Allen Triumph	Twin	-	DNF
DNF	(United Kingdom) Ernie L.Vant/R.Moore	96	690cc	Rickman Triumph	Twin	-	DNF
DNF	(United Kingdom) Chris Vincent/Keith Scott	7	644cc	CVS	Twin	-	DNF
DNF	(United Kingdom) Eric G.Wilmott/M.D.Duncan	65	690cc	Rickman Triumph	Twin	-	DNF
DNF	(United Kingdom) Terry W.Windle/Rae Hinchcliffe	22	654cc	Windrick BSA	Twin	-	DNF
DNF	(United Kingdom) D.F.Wood/D.Coomber	57	750cc	Curley Atlas	Twin	-	DNF
DNF	(United Kingdom) John Wright-Bailey/Eddie D.Kiff	85	649cc	Triumph	Twin	-	DNF

== 1970 Isle of Man Lightweight TT 250cc final standings ==
6 Laps (226.38 Miles) Mountain Course.

Place	Rider	Number	cc	Machine	Cylinders	Speed	Time	Points
1	(Australia) Kel Carruthers	17	250cc	Yamaha	Twin	96.13 mph	2:21.19.2	15
2	(United Kingdom) Rod Gould	12	250cc	Yamaha	Twin	93.75 mph	2:24.54.0	12
3	(East Germany) Günter Bartusch	30	250cc	MZ	Twin	93.75 mph	2:26.58.0	10
4	(United Kingdom) Chas S. Mortimer	4	248cc	Broad-Yamaha	Twin	91.95 mph	2:27.44.2	8
5	(United Kingdom) Peter Berwick	56	247cc	Crooks Suzuki	Twin	91.93 mph	2:27.46.0	6
6	(United Kingdom) Alex J.S.George	57	250cc	Yamaha	Twin	91.42 mph	2:28.35.8	5
7	(United Kingdom) Ian F.Richards	27	250cc	Yamaha	Twin	91.22 mph	2:28.53.6	4
8	(Sweden) Börje Jansson	32	250cc	Yamaha	Twin	90.57 mph	2:29.59.6	3
9	(United Kingdom) Tony J.Smith	29	250cc	Yamaha	Twin	90.44 mph	2:30.12.2	2
10	(United Kingdom) Bill A.Smith	2	250cc	Yamaha	Twin	90.20 mph	2:30.36.2	1
11	(United Kingdom) Derek Chatterton	20	246cc	Chat-Yamaha	Twin	89.58 mph	2:31.39.8	0
12	(South Africa) J. Peter Aitken	98	250cc	Yamaha	Twin	89.45 mph	2:31.52.8	0
13	(Northern Ireland) Tom W.Herron	99	250cc	Yamaha	Twin	89.22 mph	2:32.15.6	0
14	(Australia) Jack Findlay	9	250cc	Dugdale Yamaha	Twin	88.46 mph	2:33.34.2	0
15	(Sweden) Bo Granath	39	250cc	Yamaha	Twin	87.73 mph	2:34.50.4	0
16	(United Kingdom) Trevor T. Holdsworth	43	246cc	Unity Yamaha	Twin	87.41 mph	2:35.24.6	0
17	(Republic of Ireland) Billy C. Guthrie	31	250cc	Dugdale Yamaha	Twin	87.22 mph	2:35.45.8	0
18	(New Zealand) Peter J. Leahy	66	246cc	Chat Yamaha	Twin	87.05 mph	2:36.03.0	0
19	(United Kingdom) Dave Browning	5	250cc	Yamaha	Twin	86.88 mph	2:36.21.0	0
20	(United Kingdom) Paul J. Cott	80	250cc	Yamaha	Twin	86.76 mph	2:36.34.4	0
21	(United Kingdom) Dudley P. Robinson	51	246cc	Padgett Yamaha	Twin	86.62 mph	2:36.49.6	0
22	(Switzerland) Werner Pfirter	94	250cc	Yamaha	Twin	86.45 mph	2:37.08.6	0
23	(United Kingdom) W. John Stanley	48	250cc	Yamaha	Twin	84.16 mph	2:41.25.2	0
24	(United Kingdom) Billy Nelson	25	246cc	Doncaster Yamaha	Twin	83.41 mph	2:42.52.8	0
25	(United Kingdom) Jim Curry	16	249cc	Honda	Twin	81.5 mph	2:46.41.6	0
26	(United Kingdom) Dick Pipes	49	246cc	Yamaha Bultaco / Yamaha	Twin	81.3 mph	2:47.05.0	0
27	(Republic of Ireland) Danny Keany	72	250cc	Yamaha	Twin	80.4 mph	2:48.57.6	0
28	Peter E. Platt	70	246cc	Greeves	Single	79.22 mph	2:51.29.8	0
29	(United Kingdom) Ray Knight	85	248cc	Thompsett Ducati	Single	78.4 mph	2:53.16.0	0
30	(United Kingdom) Andy C. Chapman	67	246cc	Padgett Yamaha	Twin	78.14 mph	2:53.50.4	0
31	(United Kingdom) Ralph Nev Watts	81	249cc	Honda	Twin	77.33 mph	2:55.40.4	0
32	(United Kingdom) Tom Loughbridge	69	246cc	Suzuki	Twin	76.71 mph	2:57.05.0	0
33	(Republic of Ireland) Tommy Robb	18	249cc	Honda / Crooks Suzuki	Twin	73.38 mph	3:05.07.8	0
DNF	(Spain) Santiago Herrero	10	250cc	Ossa	Single	-	DNF	0
DNF	(United Kingdom) Norman Dunn	55	246cc	Ewing Yamaha	Twin	-	DNF	0
DNF	(United Kingdom) Bill Rae	89	250cc	Yamaha	Twin	-	DNF	0
DNF	(United Kingdom) Stan Woods	34	250cc	Yamaha	Twin	-	DNF	0
DNF	(United Kingdom) Pat J. Walsh	76	203cc	M.V. / Aermacchi	Single	-	DNF	0
DNF	(United Kingdom) Mick Chatterton	19	246cc	Padgett Yamaha	Twin	-	DNF	0
DNF	(United Kingdom) Peter Courtney	97	247cc	Ratcliffe AJS	Single	-	DNF	0
DNF	(United Kingdom) Paul A. Smart	22	250cc	Yamaha	Twin	-	DNF	0
DNF	(United Kingdom) Barry J. Randle	23	250cc	Yamaha	Twin	-	DNF	0
DNF	(United Kingdom) Steve Murray	26	250cc	Yamaha	Twin	-	DNF	0
DNF	(United Kingdom) Raymond Ashcroft	86	250cc	Yamaha	Twin	-	DNF	0
DNF	(United Kingdom) Leonard Williams	90	248cc	Aermacchi	Single	-	DNF	0
DNF	(United Kingdom) Alec T. Campbell	82	247cc	Bultaco	Single	-	DNF	0
DNF	(West Germany) Dieter Braun	37	250cc	M.Z.	Twin	-	DNF	0
DNF	(United Kingdom) Terry P. Grotefeld	35	246cc	Padgett Yamaha	Twin	-	DNF	0
DNF	(United Kingdom) Malcolm Uphill	14	247cc	Crooks Suzuki	Twin	-	DNF	0
DNF	(United Kingdom) Gordon Keith	36	250cc	Yamaha	Twin	-	DNF	0
DNF	(United Kingdom) Mick N. Pearson	95	247cc	Shepherd	Twin	-	DNF	0
DNF	(United Kingdom) Lindsay S. Porter	84	246cc	Suzuki	Twin	-	DNF	0
DNF	(United Kingdom) Charles P. Garner	83	249cc	Honda / Bultaco	Twin	-	DNF	0
DNF	(United Kingdom) Harry R. Reynolds	91	248cc	Ducati	Single	-	DNF	0
DNF	(United Kingdom) John R. Hudson	53	250cc	Yamaha	Twin	-	DNF	0
DNF	(West Germany) Hans-Otto Butenuth	46	249cc	Honda	Twin	-	DNF	0
DNF	(United Kingdom) Tony Allen	44	250cc	Yamaha	Twin	-	DNF	0
DNF	(United Kingdom) John Barton	93	250cc	Kawasaki	Twin	-	DNF	0
DNF	(United Kingdom) Alan Capstick	74	249cc	Honda / DMW	Twin	-	DNF	0
DNF	(United Kingdom) John Cooper	15	250cc	Yamsel / Padgett Yamaha	Twin	-	DNF	0
DNF	(United Kingdom) Stanley Cooper	73	246cc	Suzuki	Twin	-	DNF	0
DNF	(United Kingdom) Lawrence E. Evans	88	246cc	Suzuki	Twin	-	DNF	0
DNF	(United Kingdom) Brian Finch	92	250cc	Yamaha	Twin	-	DNF	0
DNF	(Canada) Mike Kavanagh	78	250cc	Yamaha	Twin	-	DNF	0
DNF	(United Kingdom) John Kidson	45	248cc	NSU	Twin	-	DNF	0
DNF	(Canada) Nick J. Mayo	77	250cc	Kawasaki	Twin	-	DNF	0
DNF	(United Kingdom) Ray Pickrell	-	-	Honda	-	-	DNF	0
DNF	(United Kingdom) George O. Plenderleith	52	249cc	Honda	Twin	-	DNF	0
DNF	(United Kingdom) Tony Rutter	21	250cc	Yamaha	Twin	-	DNF	0
DNF	(United Kingdom) John Shacklady	40	250cc	Yamaha	Twin	-	DNF	0
DNF	(United Kingdom) Carl Ward	50	250cc	Yamaha	Twin	-	DNF	0

== 1970 Isle of Man Sidecar 500cc TT final standings ==
3 Laps (113.2 Miles) Mountain Course.

Place	Rider	Number	Country	Machine	Speed	Time	Points
1	(West Germany) Klaus Enders/Wolfgang Kalauch		West Germany	BMW	92.93 mph	1:13.05.6	15
2	(West Germany) Siegfried Schauzu/H.Schneider		West Germany	BMW	90.64 mph	1:14.56.4	12
3	(West Germany) Hans Luthringhauser/H.Cusnik		West Germany	BMW	88.25 mph	1:16.58.0	10
4	(Switzerland) Jean Claude Castella/A.Castella		Switzerland	BMW	87.91 mph	1:17.16.0	8
5	(West Germany) Horst Owesle/J.Kremer		West Germany	Munch URS	87.99 mph	1:17.22.0	6
6	(West Germany) Georg Auerbacher/Hermann Hahn		West Germany	BMW	86.81 mph	1:18.14.6	5
7	(West Germany) Arseneus Butscher/Karl Lauterbach		West Germany	BMW	83.25 mph	1:21.35.6	4
8	(United Kingdom) Charlie Freedman/Eddie Fletcher		United Kingdom	Norton	79.86 mph	1:25.02.8	3
9	(United Kingdom) L Currie/F Kay		United Kingdom	GSM	79.28 mph	1:25.40.6	2
10	(United Kingdom) Mick Horsepole/E MacPherson		United Kingdom	Triumph	77.64 mph	1:27.28.8	1

== 1970 Isle of Man Junior TT 350cc final standings ==
6 Laps (236.38 Miles) Mountain Course.

Place	Rider	Number	Country	Machine	Speed	Time	Points
1	(Italy) Giacomo Agostini		Italy	MV Agusta	101.77 mph	2:13.28.6	15
2	(United Kingdom) Alan Barnett		United Kingdom	Aermacchi	94.16 mph	2:18.23.8	12
3	(United Kingdom) Paul Smart		United Kingdom	Yamaha	93.93 mph	2:20.08.8	10
4	(United Kingdom) Malcolm Uphill		United Kingdom	Yamaha	95.55 mph	2:22.10.0	8
5	(United Kingdom) Tony Rutter		United Kingdom	Yamaha	94.60 mph	2:23.36.0	6
6	(United Kingdom) Peter Berwick		United Kingdom	Aermacchi	93.32 mph	2:25.34.2	5
7	(United Kingdom) Ray Pickrell		United Kingdom	Aermacchi	91.47 mph	2:28.30.6	4
8	(United Kingdom) Robin Duffty		United Kingdom	Aermacchi	91.40 mph	2:28.37.8	3
9	(Northern Ireland) Tommy Robb		United Kingdom	Yamaha	90.92 mph	2:29.24.6	2
10	(Australia) Jack Findlay		Australia	Norton	90.82 mph	2:29.34.0	1

== 1970 Isle of Man Lightweight TT 125cc final standings ==
3 Laps (113.00 Miles) Mountain Course.

Place	Rider	Number	Country	Machine	Speed	Time	Points
1	(West Germany) Dieter Braun		West Germany	Suzuki	89.27 mph	1:16.05.0	15
2	(Sweden) Börje Jansson		Sweden	Maico	86.56 mph	1:18.24.4	12
3	(East Germany) Gunter Bartusch		East Germany	MZ	85.93 mph	1:19.02.8	10
4	(United Kingdom) Steve Murray		United Kingdom	Honda	84.65 mph	1:20.14.6	8
5	(United Kingdom) Fred Launchbury		United Kingdom	Bultaco	84.25 mph	1:20.37.8	6
6	(United Kingdom) J.Curry		United Kingdom	Honda	83.99 mph	1:20.52.0	5
7	(Northern Ireland) Tommy Robb		United Kingdom	Maico	81.70 mph	1.23.08.8	4
8	(United Kingdom) John Kiddie		United Kingdom	Honda	81.27 mph	1.23.34.8	3
9	(United Kingdom) Barrie Dickinson		United Kingdom	Honda	80.43 mph	1.24.27.0	2
10	(United Kingdom) Ken Armstrong		United Kingdom	Honda	79.21 mph	1.25.45.2	1

== 1970 Isle of Man Senior TT 500cc final standings ==
6 Laps (236.38 Miles) Mountain Course.

Place	Rider	Number	Country	Machine	Speed	Time	Points
1	(Italy) Giacomo Agostini		Italy	MV Agusta	101.52 mph	2:13.47.6	15
2	(United Kingdom) Peter Williams		United Kingdom	Matchless	97.76 mph	2:18.57.0	12
3	(United Kingdom) Bill Smith		United Kingdom	Kawasaki	96.26 mph	2:21.07.6	10
4	(Australia) Jack Findlay		Australia	Seeley	95.99 mph	2:21.31.4	8
5	(United Kingdom) John Williams		United Kingdom	Matchless	94.19 mph	2:24.13.6	6
6	(United Kingdom) Tony Jefferies		United Kingdom	Matchless	93.80 mph	2:24.49.2	5
7	(United Kingdom) Selwyn Griffiths		United Kingdom	Matchless	93.54 mph	2:25.13.6	4
8	(United Kingdom) Brian Adams		United Kingdom	Norton	93.53 mph	2:25.14.0	3
9	(United Kingdom) Vin Duckett		United Kingdom	Matchless	92.80 mph	2:26.23.6	2
10	(United Kingdom) Steve Spencer		United Kingdom	Norton	92.61 mph	2:26.41.2	1
