= TT100 (motorcycle tyre) =

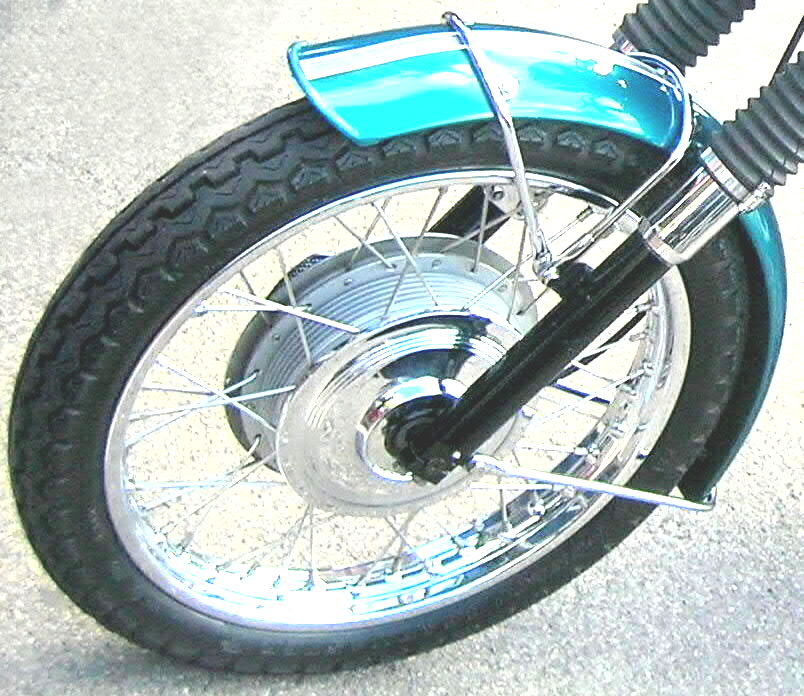
TT100 fitted to a Triumph Trident

The Dunlop K81 TT100 is a motorcycle tyre thought to be an "obligatory" performance upgrade and a tyre of choice with sporting street motorcyclists during the late 1960s and 1970s due to their shape and relatively sticky compound.

== History ==
Originally introduced in early 1968 as the Roadmaster K81 rear tyre by Dunlop Rubber Co. Ltd, the tyre was renamed "TT100" because it was the first production tyre to reach a lap speed of 100 mph over the Isle of Man TT race course when Malcolm Uphill rode his works Thruxton Bonneville to victory in 1969 with a fastest lap of 100.37 mph during the 750 cc class production race. The feat was repeated in 1971 when Ray Pickrell averaged 100.01 mph on one of the three Works Production racers, a Triumph Trident nicknamed Slippery Sam. This machine was a modified version of the motorcycle the tyre was originally designed for. The tyres were standard fitment on production models of BSA and Triumph triple motorcycles.

Originally called in some countries the "Dunlop Roadmaster K81 Trigonic Tyre" and developed from Dunlop's racing background, TT100s were first made in England, and then later reintroduced from Japan,. The tyres featured a unique "Trigonic", or triangular, profile which provided ample outstanding grip for the day, and an identical tread pattern to front and rear instead of the usual circumferentially ribbed front tyre of the day. Considered a "super tyre", it continues to be made utilising the latest technologies and materials for improved performance.
