= Downhill =

Downhill may refer to:

== Arts and entertainment ==
- Downhill (1927 film), a British film by Alfred Hitchcock
- Downhill (2014 film), a British comedy directed by James Rouse
- Downhill (2016 film), a Chilean thriller directed by Patricio Valladares
- Downhill (2020 film), an American comedy drama film directed by Nat Faxon and Jim Rash
- "Downhill" (Kim Possible), an episode in the Disney TV series Kim Possible
- The Downhill, a 1961 Greek drama film

== Places ==
- Downhill (beach), a beach in County Londonderry, Northern Ireland
- Downhill, Cornwall, a hamlet in the parish of St Eval, Cornwall, England
- Downhill, County Londonderry, a village and townland in Northern Ireland
- Downhill, Sunderland, a suburb of the City of Sunderland, Tyne and Wear, England
- Downhill, an area of Lincoln, England

== Sport ==
- Downhill skiing, the sport of sliding down snow-covered hills on skis with fixed-heel bindings
  - Downhill (ski competition), a specific kind of Alpine skiing
- Downhill mountain biking, a genre of mountain biking practiced on steep, rough terrain

== See also ==
- Down (disambiguation)
- Downhill racing (disambiguation)
- Hill (disambiguation)
- Uphill (disambiguation)
- "Down Hill", a song by Drake from Honestly, Nevermind
