= Geoff Monty =

British motorcycle racer

Monty in 1969 working on a Triumph cylinder head with a twin spark plug conversion using additional, centrally-located, smaller 10 mm plugs, mounted into a bench-vice via a tube screwed into one of the original 14 mm plug-threads

Geoff Monty was an English professional motorcycle racer, constructor, rider-sponsor and retail dealer, initially based in Kingston on Thames and later – under the name Monty and Ward – Twickenham areas, near London, with a move to Edenbridge, Kent by 1968.

In the mid-1950s he produced and campaigned his own brand of racing motorcycle known as the "Geoff Monty Special" (GMS), based on his own design of semi-spine frame with rectangular-section swinging-arm and a 350 cc BSA Gold Star engine having modified internals to achieve a capacity slightly under 250 cc.

In 1964 AMC announced their brands would be no longer produce any race machines – the 500 cc Manx Norton and Matchless G50 or the 350 cc AJS 7R.

Monty, in conjunction with his business partner Allen Dudley-Ward, a renowned Triumph tuner and ex-racer, recognised a business opportunity and developed a new machine initially named Monward, based on his proven GMS frame and swinging-arm, initially fitted with a 650 cc Triumph Bonneville engine which was used as a test-bed by then-contracted rider, Bill Ivy.

The name Monward derived from their surnames Monty and Dudley-Ward. The concept was then further developed – as Monty had done with the BSA Gold Star engine – by reducing the 650 cc capacity to under 500 cc, retaining the standard bore of 71 mm but shortening the stroke to 62.5 mm, using a new crankshaft having a shortened throw made by sidecar racer Owen Greenwood together with 10 mm shaved-off the standard cast-iron barrels. Additionally, an option was to instead fit the contemporary Triumph production engine with a standard 500 cc capacity. Both types of engine were tuned and built by Allen Dudley-Ward featuring his Manx Norton oil pump conversion.

The now-oversquare modified engine used the 650 Bonneville twin-carb cylinder head having bigger valves, ports and carburettors than a standard Triumph 500, allowing for efficient air-fuel intake at racing speeds. The 650-size crank journals and main bearings were larger than a 500 which allowed for greater reliability.

When track-testing the 500, Motorcycle Mechanics editor John Houslander reported that the engine would safely rev to 9,000 rpm making a potential 50 bhp and – with Isle of Man gearing and a four-speed gearbox – a top speed of 145 mph (233 km/h) was likely.

Concurrent with Monty's Monward, Allen Dudley-Ward was developing his own 500 cc race bike, basically a Triumph-engined Manx Norton, which he called DW Special leaving Monty's Monward renamed as Monard.

By 1965, Bill Ivy had joined the Tom Kirby team, leaving Monty as an early sponsor of Ray Pickrell, providing a 250 cc Bultaco, a 350 cc Aermacchi and his own brand-name Monard with a 500 cc Triumph engine. Speaking to Motor Cycle's David Dixon in 1965, Monty confirmed difficulty in finding customers for a complete new racer at 500 GBP, but buyers seemed prepared to pay 400 to 450 GBP for a well-used proprietary Norton or AJS/Matchless factory-produced race bike.

For 1966 Monty turned his attention to building a new Triumph-engined racer based on the then-new Metisse frame. Monty also was a stockist of engineering bearings, offering a mail-order service.

Monty died whilst a resident of Wadebridge, Cornwall during 2009, aged 92. He was pre-deceased by his wife Greta, whom he married in 1941, in 2005.
