= Uphill (disambiguation) =

Uphill is a village in Weston-super-Mare, England.

Uphill may also refer to:

== People ==
- Dennis Uphill (1931–2007), an English footballer
- Malcolm Uphill (1935–1999), a Welsh motorcycle racer
- Tom Uphill (1874–1962), a Canadian politician
- Zoe Uphill (born 1982), an Australian rower

== Places ==
- Uphill, Ontario, part of Dalton Township, Ontario, Canada
- Uphill, an area of Lincoln, England

== See also ==
- Downhill (disambiguation)
- Kurixalus naso, the uphill tree frog
