= Down =

Down most often refers to:

- Down, the relative direction opposed to up
- Down (gridiron football), in North American/gridiron football, a period when one play takes place
- Down feather, a soft bird feather used in bedding and clothing
- Downland, a type of hill

Down may also refer to:

== Places ==
- County Down, Northern Ireland, UK
  - County Down (Parliament of Ireland constituency), abolished 1800
  - Down (Northern Ireland Parliament constituencies)
  - Down (Northern Ireland Parliament constituency), 1921–1929
  - Down (UK Parliament constituency), 1801–1885 and 1922–1950
  - Down (civil parish)
  - Down county football team, Gaelic football
- Down, County Westmeath, Ireland
- Downe, Greater London, England, formerly called "Down"

== People ==
- Down (surname)
- John Langdon Down (1828–1896), British physician best known for his description of Down syndrome
- Down AKA Kilo (born 1985), American rapper

== Film and television ==
- Down (film), a 2001 English remake of the film De Lift
- "Down" (Breaking Bad), an episode of the second season of Breaking Bad
- "Down" (Into the Dark), an episode of the first season of Into the Dark

== Literature ==
- Down (comics), a comic book published by Top Cow Productions
- Down (novel), a 1997 Bernice Summerfield novel by Lawrence Miles

== Music ==
- Down (band), an American heavy metal supergroup
- Down (The Jesus Lizard album), 1994
- Down (Sentenced album), 1996

=== Songs ===
- "Down" (311 song), 1996
- "Down" (Blink-182 song), 2003
- "Down" (Fifth Harmony song), 2017
- "Down" (Jay Sean song), 2009
- "Down" (Jessi song), 2018
- "Down" (The Kooks song), 2014
- "Down" (Marian Hill song), 2016
- "Down" (Motograter song), 2003
- "Down" (R.K.M & Ken-Y song), 2006
- "Down" (Stone Temple Pilots song), 1999
- "Down", by Blackbear from Anonymous, 2019
- "Down", by Breaking Benjamin from Ember
- "Down", by Brymo from Merchants, Dealers & Slaves
- "Down", by Chris Brown from Exclusive
- "Down", by Dave Gahan from Hourglass
- "Down", by Davido from Omo Baba Olowo
- "Down", by Earshot from Two
- "Down", by Five for Fighting from Bookmarks
- "Down", by Gravity Kills from Gravity Kills
- "Down", by Harry Nilsson from Nilsson Schmilsson
- "Down", by Headswim from Flood
- "Down", by Hot Chip from Freakout/Release
- "Down", by Juelz Santana from From Me to U
- "Down", by Kutless from Kutless
- "Down", by Lindisfarne from Nicely Out of Tune
- "Down", by Mat Kearney from Young Love
- "Down", by Miles Davis from Birdland 1951
- "Down", by Modern Day Zero
- "Down", by Pearl Jam from Lost Dogs
- "Down", by Pitchshifter from PSI
- "Down", by the Prom Kings from The Prom Kings
- "Down", by Seether from Holding Onto Strings Better Left to Fray
- "Down", by Widespread Panic from Don't Tell the Band
- "Down", by Yelawolf from Shady XV

== Other uses ==
- Downtime, when a service is unavailable
- Down (game theory), a standard position in mathematical game theory
- Rail directions, where down and up have locally significant meanings
- DOWN (app), social networking and online dating app

== See also ==
- "Down Down", a 1975 song by Status Quo
- Down GAA, responsible for the administration of Gaelic games in County Down, Northern Ireland
- Down quark, an elementary constituent of matter
- Down payment, a term used in the context of the purchase of items
- Down syndrome, a genetic disorder
- DN (disambiguation)
- Downe (disambiguation)
- Downhill (disambiguation)
- Downs (disambiguation)
- Downstairs (disambiguation)
- Downtown (disambiguation)
- Down Down Down (disambiguation)
