= Doug Hele =

British motorcycle engineer

- Hele in 1967
- Born: 13 July 1919; King's Norton, Birmingham
- Died: 3 November 2001 (aged 82); Hagley
- Occupation: Motorcycle engineer

Douglas Lionel Hele (13 July 1919 – 3 November 2001) was a pioneering English motorcycle engineer with Triumph and other firms: BSA, Douglas and Norton. He was born in Birmingham in 1919 and died in Hagley, Worcestershire on 2 November 2001.

== Career ==
Described as an 'outstanding student' at King's Norton Secondary School. Hele started his career in engineering as an apprentice with the Austin Motor Company at the Longbridge factory in Birmingham where he worked throughout the Second World War. He moved on to Douglas Motorcycles in Bristol in 1945 where he worked as a draughtsman in the motorcycle design team under former Norton chief designer Walter Moore. Moore encouraged him to go to the Norton factory, where he helped Polish engineer Leo Kusmicki design and develop the Featherbed framed Manx Norton single-cylinder racing models that won world championships in the early 1950s.

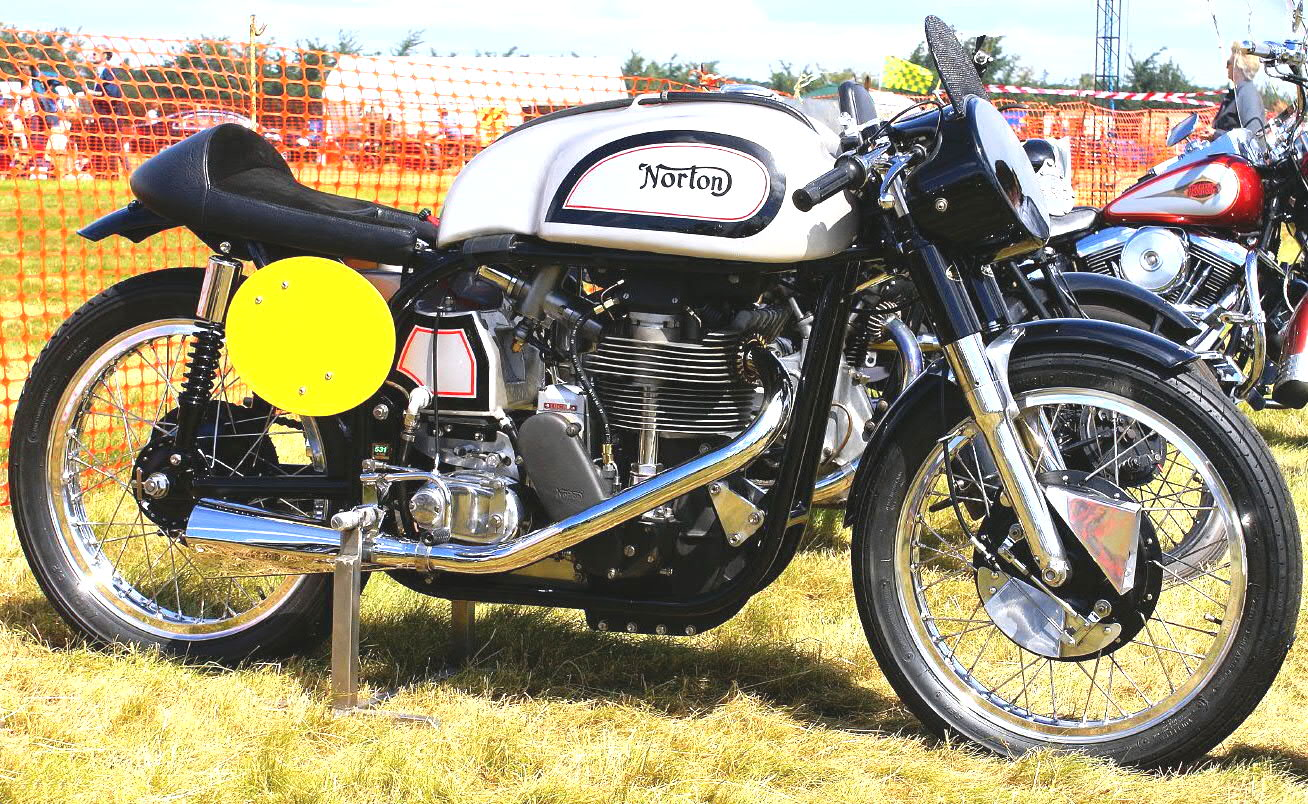
Pre-1962 specification Manx Norton

After a short time at BSA where he worked on the 250cc single-cylinder racer with BSA chief designer Bert Hopwood he returned to Norton to continue development of the "Manx" and it is his 1961 version that is the most sought after by collectors today.

His next project was the development of the 500 cc Norton Dominator into a racing motorcycle. Hele's prototype "Domiracer" came third in the 1961 Isle of Man TT averaging over 100 mph but the project was abandoned when parent-company Associated Motor Cycles ended racing-development at Norton to cut costs. The factory race shop's larger capacity 650 Domiracer also showed promise, so Hele was encouraged and developed the 650 cc road bike which went on to win the Thruxton 500 production-class race for three years in a row giving Norton much needed publicity.

Norton closed the Birmingham factory in 1962 and moved production to Plumstead, South London, but Hele was ready for a change and took a job with the Ford Motor Company in their Dagenham factory. Things didn't really work out so it was with great relief when he accepted the position of Head of Development with Triumph in Meriden.

His first project was to improve the Triumph Bonneville T120. Drawing from his success with Norton Dominator twins, Hele raised the power output from 47 bhp to 52 bhp on open megaphone exhausts by careful modifications to the design of the camshafts and cam followers. Keen to keep the power gains for road and production racing use, he added a balance pipe between the two exhaust pipes where they exited the cylinder head adjacent to the ports, quieting the engine and allowing use of a less-restrictive silencer. A decrease in exhaust-gas velocity caused by linking each cylinder into effectively two silencers was addressed by reducing the exhaust pipe diameter from 1^{1}/_{2}" to 1^{1}/_{4}".

Hele then turned his attention to developing the 500 cc Tiger 100 into a racer, winning the 1966 American Daytona 200 race, resulting in a new top 500 cc street-model having twin Amal carburettors being introduced in late 1966 as part of the 1967 range, named as Triumph Daytona. The race win was repeated in 1967.

At the 1969 Belgian Grand Prix on the Spa-Francorchamps circuit in the Ardennes, Triumph's factory tester Percy Tait led the world champion Giacomo Agostini for three laps and finished second at an average speed of 116 mph on Hele's Daytona racer.

Hele had also started work on development of the three-cylinder Triumph Trident. Motor Cycle's Technical Editor Vic Willoughby concluded his 1967 interview with Hele's confirmation that "...a high-performance seven-fifty parallel twin is not exactly at the top of the desirability stakes", and the triples were developed into the most successful race bikes of their time, dominating the 750cc races in Europe and the US. Hopwood attributed the massive racing success to Hele's 'brilliance' and greatly criticised the BSA-Triumph board's reluctance to promote him to more senior positions.

Hele was offered the chance to return to Norton with their then-new F750 team for 1972, but decided to stay with Triumph. By the early 1970s the BSA-Triumph group was in financial trouble and Hele moved to the experimental team at Kitts Green in Birmingham. When Triumph finally closed Doug Hele turned down a job from a Japanese company and joined outboard motor makers British Seagull in Dorset. In his 70s Hele ended his career working as a freelance designer on the rotary-engined Norton model.

== Sources ==
- Triumph Experimental: Doug Hele and his development team 1962-1975 by Mick Duckworth (2013) ISBN 978-1-907139-09-3
