= Downed =

Downed may refer to:

- Downed (animal), an animal unable to stand
- "Downed", a song by Cheap Trick from the album In Color

== See also ==
- Downed opponent, in combat sports
- Down (disambiguation)
