= DN =

DN, dN, or dn may refer to:

== Science, technology, and mathematics ==
=== Computing and telecommunications ===
- Digital number, the discrete of an analog value sampled by an analog-to-digital converter
- Directory number in a phone system
- Distinguished Name, an identifier type in the LDAP protocol
- Domain name, an identification string used within the Internet
- Domain Nameserver
- DOS Navigator, a DOS file manager

=== Mathematics ===
- dn (elliptic function), one of Jacobi's elliptic functions
- D_{n}, a Coxeter–Dynkin diagram
- D_{n}, a dihedral group
- D_{n}, a Dirichlet kernel

=== Other uses in science and technology ===
- Decinewton (symbol dN), an SI unit of force
- Diametre Nominal, the European equivalent of Nominal Pipe Size
- Diameter of a rolling element bearing in mm multiplied by its speed in rpm
- Deductive-nomological model, a philosophical model for scientific explanation
- Double negative T cells, also called CD4^{−}CD8^{−}
- Diabetic nephropathy
- Diabetic neuropathy
- DN Factor, a value used to calculate the correct lubricant for bearings

== Entertainment ==
- Double nil, a bid in the game of Spades (card game)
- Descriptive chess notation
- Duke Nukem, a video game character and a game franchise

== Journalism ==
- The Ball State Daily News, the student newspaper of Ball State University in Muncie, Indiana
- Dagens Næringsliv, a Norwegian newspaper
- Dagens Nyheter, a Swedish newspaper
- Democracy Now!, the flagship program for the Pacifica Radio network
- Diário de Notícias, a Portuguese newspaper

== Places ==
- Denmark (WMO country code DN)
- DN postcode area for Doncaster and surrounding areas, UK
- Dunedin, New Zealand (commonly abbreviated DN)
- Dadra and Nagar Haveli, a former union territory of India

== Other uses ==
- DN, IATA code of Dan Air
- Down (disambiguation)
- Diebold Nixdorf, American financial technology company
- Digha Nikaya, a part of the Buddhist Tripitaka
- International DN, a kind of iceboat
- Dreadnought, a class of warships
- Debit note, a commercial document
- DN, then IATA code for Norwegian Air Argentina
- DN, then IATA code for Senegal Airlines
- Central Sulawesi (vehicle registration prefix DN)
