= Percy Tait =

English motorcycle racer (1929–2019)

- Nationality: British
- Died: 17 November 2019
Motorcycle racing career statistics
Grand Prix motorcycle racing
Active years	1968 – 1971
First race	1968 500 cc Ulster Grand Prix
Last race	1971 500 cc Ulster Grand Prix
Team	Triumph
Starts / Wins / Podiums / Poles / F. laps / Points; 4 / 0 / 2 / 0 / 0 / 33

Percy Tait (9 October 1929 – 17 November 2019) was an English professional motorcycle road racer and senior road tester for Triumph motorcycles, where he was estimated to have covered over a million miles of road testing. He later became a farmer specialising in award-winning rare breeds of sheep.

== National Service ==
Tait gained useful knowledge of motorcycle handling during his National Service, when he was a member of the Royal Corps of Signals White Helmets Motorcycle Display Team.

== Motorcycle career ==
Tait joined Triumph at the age of 21 in 1950 on the assembly line but was soon promoted to the Experimental Department and was encouraged to go road racing by his manager Frank Baker. Tait joined the Triumph works team and worked under Doug Hele on Triumph's chassis development programme through the early 1960s. He became the main test rider for the development of the three cylinder motorcycles which meant clocking up high mileages in all weathers and grueling sessions at MIRA and in wind tunnels. Triumph engineer Brian Jones was watching the Thruxton 500 endurance race for production motorcycles and saw Tait come into the pits after an hour on the track and plunge his blistered hands into a bucket of water. Following this, Jones worked with Hele on improvements to the chassis which resulted in an Isle of Man TT victory. Testing could also be dangerous work and he broke his collarbone when he was thrown off a prototype Triumph when the gearbox seized at the 1968 Isle of Man TT.

== Racing career ==
In the 1969 Belgian Grand Prix, on the Spa-Francorchamps racetrack in the Ardennes, Tait was riding Triumph's entry for the 500 cc race – a version of the Triumph Daytona developed by Doug Hele. Tait travelled with the mechanics Arthur Jakeman and Jack Shemans in an old Ford Transit van, in which the three of them also had to sleep. He led the world champion Giacomo Agostini for three laps to finish second to the MV Agusta at an average speed of 116 mph. Also in 1969, he teamed with Malcolm Uphill to win the Thruxton 500 endurance race.

'Slippery Sam' was one of three similar motorcycles Triumph built for the 1970 Production TT, one of which, ridden by Malcolm Uphill, won the race at 97.71 mph. The Slippery Sam name was acquired during the 1970 Bol d'Or 24 Hour Race in France when a faulty oil pump covered Tait with engine oil. In 1971 Tait and Ray Pickrell won the Bol d'Or 24-hour endurance race on a Triumph triple.

In 1975, Tait was hired as a consultant by Yamaha to improve the handling of their XS650 machine. His subtle improvements were judged to make a significant improvement.

Tait was hired by Suzuki in 1976 to help develop their 500 cc Grand Prix bike for Barry Sheene. In 1976, Tait won the 750 class at the North West 200 race. He continued racing two-strokes and 'Slippery Sam' in his late forties but gave up racing after a serious crash on the 'Son of Sam' production racer in the 1976 Production TT.

== Motor trade business ==
Tait set up a successful Suzuki dealership business after the Meriden factory closed until 2002.

== Sheep farming ==
Tait went on to become a champion sheep breeder, winning England's Royal Show, the Royal Welsh Show and Scotland's Royal Highland Show with his Blue Demaine and champion Rouge Shearling ewes. His Worcestershire farm is home to the Knighton Flock.
