= Upstairs =

Upstairs may refer to:

- Upstairs, a term relating to stairs
- Upstairs (album), a 2004 album by Shane & Shane
- Upstairs (film), a 1919 American silent comedy film
- "Upstairs", a 2006 song by Psapp from The Only Thing I Ever Wanted

== See also ==
- Downstairs (disambiguation)
- Theatre Upstairs, at the Royal Court Theatre, London, England
- Upstairs Theatre, at the Belvoir St Theatre, Sydney, Australia
- Upstairs Theatre, at the Westside Theatre, New York City, US
- Upstairs Theatre, at the theatre complex home to the Steppenwolf Theatre Company in Chicago, US
- Upstairs at Studio 54, a cabaret venue in New York City, US
- Upstairs at the Gatehouse, a theatre in Highgate, North London, England
