= Downe (disambiguation) =

Downe is a village in London.

Downe may also refer to:

== People ==
- Bill Downe (born 1952), Canadian banker
- Don Downe (born 1951), Canadian politician and farmer
- Edward Downe Jr. (born 1929), American businessman and socialite
- Percy Downe (born 1954), Canadian politician
- Ryan Downe, American musician and audio engineer
- Taime Downe (born 1964), American musician

== Other uses ==
- Downe (crater), a feature on Mars
- Downe Bank, a nature reserve in Bromley, London
- Downe Communications, a publishing company
- Downe Hospital, in Downpatrick, Northern Ireland
- Downe House, Richmond Hill, a listed building in London
- Downe House School, a girls' boarding school in Berkshire, England
- Downe Township, New Jersey, a township in Cumberland County, New Jersey
- Bob Downe, a character of Australian comedian Mark Trevorrow
- Earl of Downe, a title in the Peerage of Ireland
- Viscount Downe, a title in the Peerage of Ireland

== See also ==
- Down (disambiguation)
- Downer (disambiguation)
- Downey (disambiguation)
