= Pfirter =

Pfirter is a surname. Notable people with the surname include:

- Markus Pfirter (born 1939), Swiss footballer
- Rogelio Pfirter (born 1948), Argentine diplomat
- Werner Pfirter (1946–1973), Swiss motorcycle road racer
