= Triumph Tiger Daytona =

British motorcycle

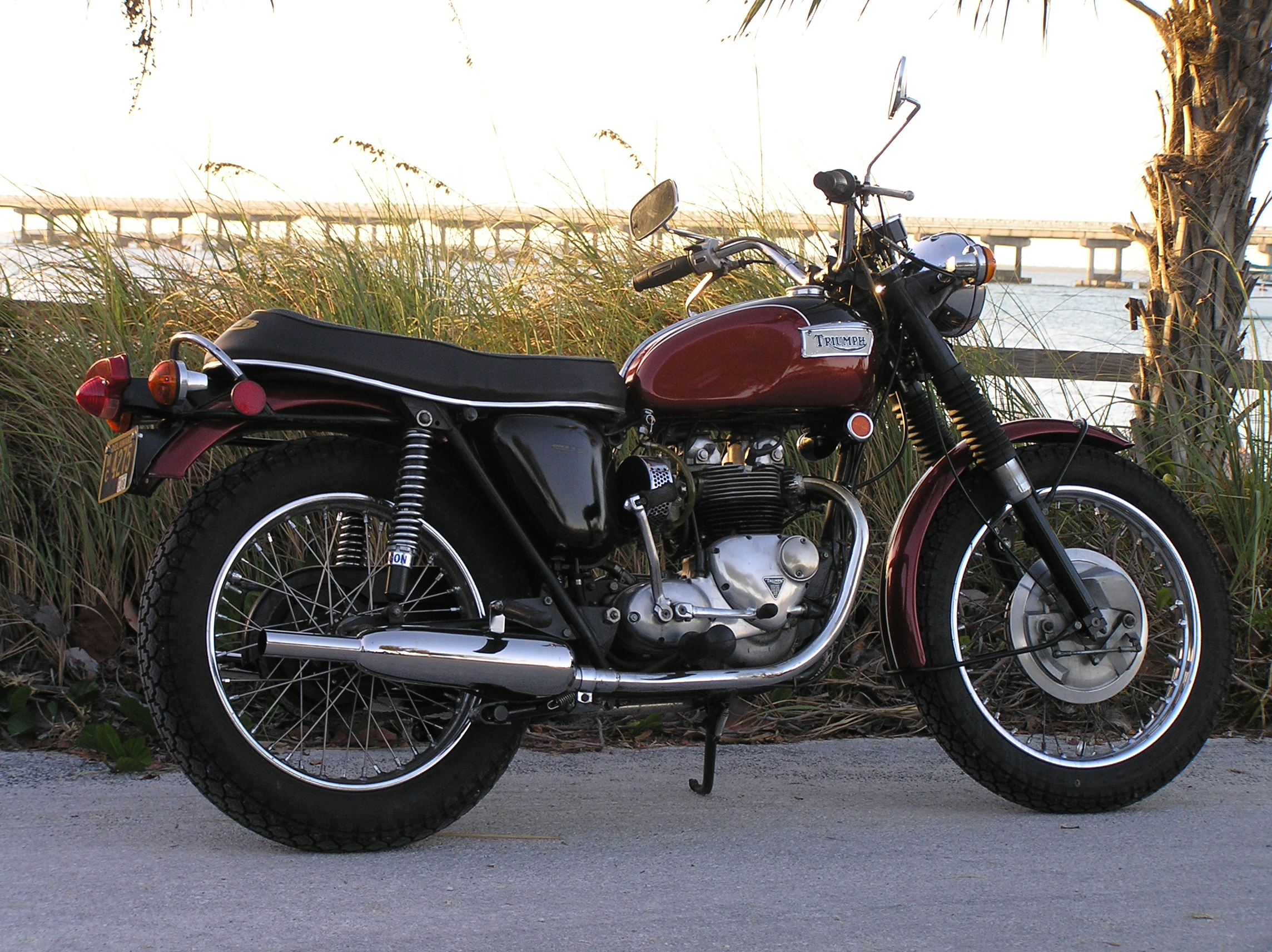
- 1971 Triumph T100R Daytona
- Manufacturer: Triumph
- Also called: T100R
- Production: 1967–1974
- Engine: 490 cc (30 cu in) air-cooled, ohv parallel-twin
- Bore / stroke: 69 mm × 65.5 mm (2.72 in × 2.58 in)
- Power: 41 bhp (31 kW) @ 7,400 rpm
- Transmission: 4-speed gearbox with chain final drive
- Wheelbase: 53.6 inches (1,360 mm)
- Weight: 418.9 pounds (190.0 kg) (dry)

The Triumph Tiger Daytona is a motorcycle made by Triumph from 1967 to 1974.

== Development ==
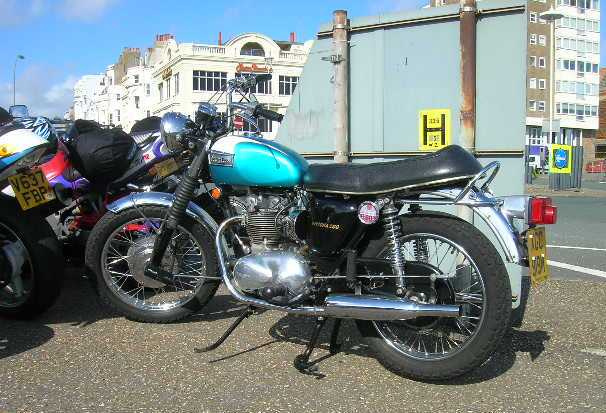
1973 500cc Triumph T100R Daytona with aftermarket rear suspension units

The 'Daytona' name was derived from American rider Buddy Elmore's win at the 1966 Daytona 200 race held at the Daytona International Speedway in Daytona Beach, Florida. He achieved an average speed of 96.6 mph (155.5 km/h) on a 'works special' Triumph Tiger 100.

The 500 cc Triumph Tiger 100 Daytona (T100T) was developed by Triumph's Chief Engineer and designer Doug Hele and launched as a production motorcycle the following year. Based on the setup developed for the 1966 Daytona races, the T100T was fitted with a new cylinder head and twin Amal Monobloc carburettors. In the head, the valve angle was reduced by two degrees and the intake valve size increased as a result of testing; the valves on test engines had a worrying tendency to meet during the overlap period.

Derived from Edward Turner's original twin-cylinder design and a development of the Triumph Tiger, the 'Daytona' sacrificed low-speed tractability for a pronounced power step at 3,500 rpm that helped it to compete with the advanced designs from Japanese manufacturers like Honda. As well as decreased engine flexibility, however, the increase in power reduced the life of the valve gear, leading to heavy oil consumption.

Gary Nixon won the 1967 Daytona 200 race on the newly designated Triumph Daytona.

In 1969, the timing side main bush was replaced with a ball-bearing race and a roller on the drive side which helped engine life. At the 1969 Belgian motorcycle Grand Prix on the Circuit de Spa-Francorchamps in the Ardennes, Triumph's factory tester Percy Tait led the world champion Giacomo Agostini for three laps and finished second at an average speed of 116 mph (187 km/h) on the Daytona.

The later model Daytonas were further upgraded with special E3134 race profile cams for both inlet and exhaust and strengthened followers, valve guides, and performance connecting rods. While the Triumph 650 Bonneville and new 650 Tiger models received a new oil in frame and dramatically changed geometry for 1971, the Daytona kept the traditional unit era frame, which kept the frame and seat height of the previous model years. The last Daytona model, the T100D, was fitted with a disc front brake but only 14 were built before the closure of the Meriden works in September 1973 and the 18-month 'sit-in' industrial action after which the Daytona models were discontinued.

== See also ==
- List of Triumph motorcycles
