= Downhill racing =

Downhill racing may refer to:

Summer sports

- Billy Carts
- BMX racing
- Downhill inline skating
- Downhill mountain biking
- Longboarding
- Sandboarding
- Slalom skateboarding
- Soapbox racing
- Street luge

Winter sports

- Alpine skiing
- Ice cross downhill
- Speed skiing
- Ski cross
- Sledding
- Snowboard cross
- Speed skiing
