= DN factor =

Value used to determine base oil viscosity

DN factor, also called DN Value, is a number that is used to determine the correct base oil viscosity for the lubrication of various types of bearings.

It can also be used to determine if a bearing is the correct choice for use in a given application. It is a product of bearing diameter (D) and speed (N).

D = diameter (in millimeters) of the bearing in question. For most types of bearings, there are actually two required measurements: the inner diameter and outer diameter. In such cases, D = (A+B)/2, where A = inner diameter and B = outer diameter. The sum of these two values is then divided by 2 to obtain the median diameter, sometimes also called pitch diameter.

N = bearing speed. This is the maximum amount of revolutions per minute (RPM) that the bearing will move.

The DN factor of a bearing is obtained by multiplying the median diameter (A + B)/2 by RPM, and sometimes by a correction factor. This correction factor may vary from manufacturer to manufacturer. No consensus exists among tribologists as to a constant correction factor across manufacturers.

== Example formula ==
For a single or double row cylindrical bearing, the following formula would be used to obtain the DN factor. It includes a correction factor of 2:

$DN factor = ((A+B)/2) * RPM * 2$

Where:

- A and B represent inner and outer diameters, respectively
- A and B are divided by 2 to find the median diameter
- RPM is the maximum speed of the bearing
- 2 is the correction factor for this particular (hypothetical) manufacturer

== Usage ==
Once the DN factor of a bearing has been obtained, it can be used to consult grease selection charts in order to determine the correct lubricant. Viscosity must be matched to the needs of the bearing in order to obtain maximum efficiency, and to avoid lubricant runout due to overheating, which is a consequence of metal-on-metal contact, as well as the failure of grease to extract heat from the bearing system.

Viscosity is usually quantified as the kinematic viscosity or ISO grade of the grease's base oil, as per ASTM D445. This is separate from the National Lubricating Grease Institute (NLGI) consistency number, which is regarded as the standard measure of grease thickness.

Knowing the DN factor of a bearing is critical to preventing lubricant starvation, which is characterized by decreasing lubricant film thickness coupled with increased bearing speed. Starvation occurs when bearing speed (N) exceeds the ability of the lubricant to flow back into the bearing track. This phenomenon can be the cause of metal-on-metal contact, which causes rapid wear and necessitates early replacement. Jauhari shows that degree of starvation is a function of relative lubricant layer thickness for given operating conditions. He also states that "the rolling fatigue life of [a] bearing depends greatly upon the viscosity and film thickness between the rolling contact-surface [sic]."
