= Thruxton 500 =

The Thruxton 500 was a motorcycle endurance race for production based road machines, covering 500 miles and ridden by a team of two riders per machine. The first event was a 9-hour race which took place in 1955, organized by the Southampton and District Motorcycle Club (SDMCC) at the Thruxton Circuit near Andover in Hampshire. Two more 9-hour races followed in 1956 and 1957.

These earlier 9-hour races resulted in the birth of the famous Thruxton 500 miler, the first taking place in 1958 and the last in 1973.

The Thruxton 500 was an endurance race for production based road machines, covering 500 miles and ridden by a team of two riders per machine.

There were twelve Thruxton 500 events between 1958 and 1973. During that period, there were four races where the 500 miler had to be run at two different circuits because of poor track conditions at Thruxton. The first rearranged 500 miler race was at Castle Combe in 1965 followed by three other meetings at Brands Hatch in 1966, 1967 and 1968.

In the 1960s, the Thruxton 500 race was very important to British motorcycle manufacturers as a test of their bikes which provided public exposure. A win, or second and third places in the Thruxton 500, offered advertising opportunities and boosted sales, resulting in keen competition around Thruxton's fast, flowing and demanding track.

Four other endurance events were held at Thruxton but not under the Thruxton 500 name. There were two Powerbike Internationals in 1974 and 1975 and two Grand Prix D'Endurance events in 1976 and 1977.

Seven other endurance events were organized by the SDMMC at different circuits around the UK.

Similar events were the Bemsee-organised Hutchinson 100 at Silverstone and the 'Motor Cycle' 500 at Brands Hatch in 1966 where Mike Hailwood demonstrated a Honda CB450 Black Bomber fitted with a sports fairing. It was unable to compete in the 500cc category, the FIM deeming it was not classified as a production machine as it had two overhead camshafts.

Only one motorcycle race a year is now held at Thruxton, a round of the British Superbike Championship

== History ==
As with many Second World War airfields, RAF Thruxton found a new role in the 1950s as a motorcycle racing circuit. Declared surplus to RAF requirements in 1946, the early track included both the runways and perimeter track.

An application was made in 1949 by the SDMCC to the Auto Cycle Union for approval of the circuit for motorcycle racing, with the result that an official track inspection took place on New Year's Day 1950. It was attended by Syd Lawton, Arthur Wheeler, Cyril Quantrill and a number of members of the SDMCC. The track certificate was granted and the first Thruxton motorcycle event took place on Easter Monday 1950, organised by the SDMCC.

The Bristol Motorcycle and Light Car Club organized a race event on 4 August 1952.

In 1953, the east–west runway was cut out, the western part of the perimeter track was included, and the direction was changed to clockwise.

The clerk of the course for the first endurance event was the late Neville Goss.

9 Hour results

- 1955: W.E. Dow, and E.B.Crooks on a 500 BSA at 67.71 mph.
- 1956: K.W. James and I.Lloyd on a 350 BSA at 72.3 mph.
- 1957: F.Weber and R. Avery on a 350 BSA at 67.0 mph.

Motorcycle racing continued on the bumpy wartime tarmac (which was slowly breaking) until 1965, when plans were agreed for a new track. The new layout ignored the original runways and followed the perimeter road with an added chicane and three tight corners in succession (named Campbell, Cobb and Segrave) which became referred to as the complex.

In 1968 the British Automobile Racing Club took over the track and the longer circuit was used.

Racing at Thruxton became famous for the endurance events for production motorcycles, and the Thruxton 500 in particular. The machines were supposed to be the same as could be bought, but most factories of the time invested in a racing team that invariably developed the motorcycles as much as possible.

The Triumph factory first showed their Thruxton Bonneville – a hand-built, extra-specification race-styled machine at the 1964 Earls Court Show, with very-limited production in 1965.

== 500 mile race results at Thruxton circuit ==
Year	Riders	Motorcycle	Notes
1958	Mike Hailwood, Dan Shorey	650 Triumph	66.0 mph
1959	John Lewis, Bruce Daniels	600 BMW R69	66.88 mph
1960	Ron Langston, Don Chapman	650 AJS. 31CSR	68.48 mph
1961	Tony Godfrey, John Holder	650 Triumph T120R	67.29 mph
1962	Phil Read, Brian Setchell	650 Norton	76.45 mph
1963	Phil Read, Brian Setchell	647 Norton	68.57 mph
1964	Brian Setchell, Derek Woodman	650 Norton	68.57 mph
1969	Percy Tait, Malcolm Uphill	650 Triumph	84.30 mph
1970	Peter Williams, Charley Sanby	745 Norton	74.80 mph
1971	Percy Tait, Dave Croxford	744 Triumph	84.64 mph
1972	Dave Croxford, Mick Grant	745 Norton	85.00 mph
1973	Rex Butcher, Norman White	745 Norton	82.57 mph

== 500 mile race results held at alternate circuits ==
Year	Riders	Circuit	Motorcycle	Notes
1965	Dave Degens, Barry Lawton	Castle Combe	650 Triumph	79.18 mph
1966	Dave Degens, Rex Butcher	Brands Hatch	650 Triumph	79.10 mph
1967	Percy Tait, Rod Gould	Brands Hatch	649 Triumph	79.15 mph
1968	Dave Nixon, Peter Butler	Brands Hatch	490 Triumph	75.52 mph
