= Down Down Down (disambiguation) =

"Down Down Down" is a song by Charlie Simpson from his album Young Pilgrim. The phrase may also refer to:

- "Down Down Down (The Preset song)", a 2006 single by The Presets
- "Down Down Down", an episode of the superhero television series Batwoman
- "Down, Down, Down", a song by Joe Satriani from his self-titled album
- "Down, Down, Down", a children's book by Steve Jenkins about the Pelagic zone.
