= Downstairs =

Downstairs may refer to:

- Downstairs, a term relating to stairs
- "Downstairs", a 2025 song by Twenty One Pilots from Breach
- Downstairs (EP), an independent release by the band 311
- Downstairs (film), a 1932 film starring John Gilbert
- The Downstairs Club, a music venue in Bournemouth, England, later Le Disque a Go! Go!

== See also ==
- Downstair
- Downstairs Theatre, at the Belvoir St Theatre, Sydney, Australia
- Downstairs Theatre, at the Westside Theatre, New York City, US
- Downstairs Theatre, at the theatre complex home to the Steppenwolf Theatre Company in Chicago, US
- Theatre Downstairs, at the Royal Court Theatre, London, England
- Upstairs (disambiguation)
