= BSA Rocket 3/Triumph Trident =

1960s/1970s British motorcycle made by Triumph Engineering, Meriden

Triumph Trident/BSA Rocket 3
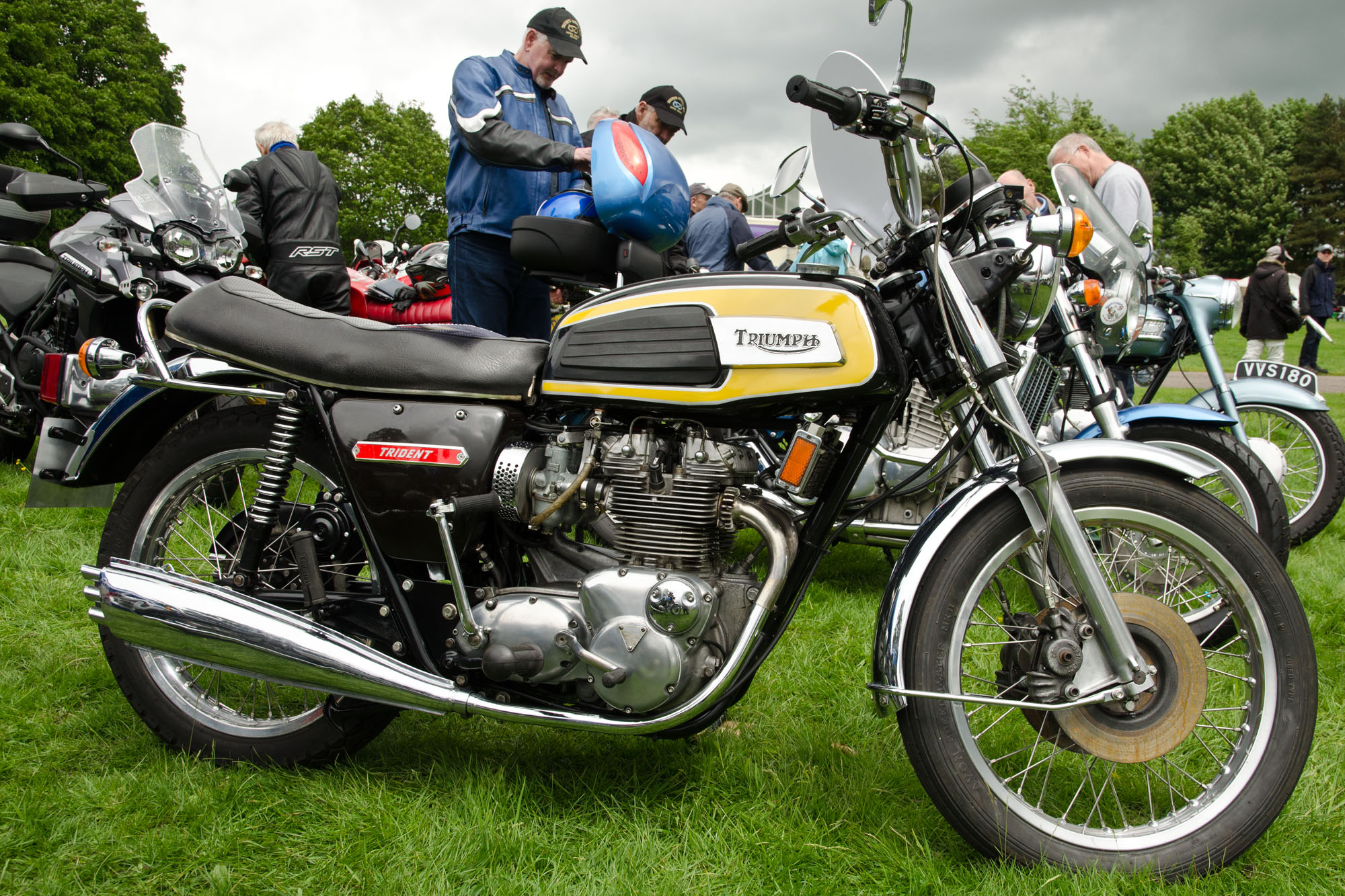
- Trident T150
- Manufacturer: Triumph Engineering and BSA
- Also called: T150/T160, Rocket III, Rocket Three
- Production: 1968–1975
- Engine: Air-cooled 740 cc (45 cu in) OHV triple
- Bore / stroke: 67 mm × 70 mm (2.6 in × 2.8 in)
- Compression ratio: 9.5:1
- Top speed: 117.03 mph (188.34 km/h)
- Power: 58 bhp (43 kW) @ 7,500 rpm
- Transmission: Dry clutch, 4 speed, chain, 5 speed on T150V and T160
- Frame type: Steel
- Suspension: Telescopic fork, swingarm
- Brakes: 1968–1971: 2LS drum/drum 1972–1975: disc/drum 1975: disc/disk T160
- Tires: 3.25-19, 4.10-19
- Wheelbase: 57.5 in (1,460 mm)
- Dimensions: W: 22.7
- Seat height: 31.7 in (805.18 mm)
- Weight: 468 lb (212 kg) (dry); 499 lb (226 kg) (1/2 tank) (wet)
- Fuel capacity: 5.12 US gal (19.4 L; 4.26 imp gal)
- Fuel consumption: 30–40 mpg_{‑US} (7.8–5.9 L/100 km; 36–48 mpg_{‑imp})

The Triumph Trident and BSA Rocket 3 was a technically advanced, high-performance roadster (or standard) motorcycle made by Triumph Engineering and BSA (both companies part of the Birmingham Small Arms Company) from 1968 to 1975, and sold under both the Triumph and BSA marques. Alongside the Honda CB750, and later the two-stroke Kawasaki triples, it brought a new level of sophistication to street motorcycles, marking the beginning of the superbike era. The superior performing Honda CB750 overshadowed the Trident to be remembered as the 'first superbike', in spite of the Triumph Trident actually debuting before the Honda by a few weeks.

It had a 58 bhp (43 kW), 740-cubic-centimetre (45 cu in) air-cooled OHV unit construction straight-three engine, with four gears and a conventional chassis and suspension. The engine had less vibration than the existing 360° twins. The Rocket 3/Trident was part of Triumph's plan to extend the model range beyond their 650 cc parallel twins. It was the last major motorcycle developed by Triumph at Meriden, West Midlands, created to meet the demands of the US market. Although BSA experienced serious financial difficulties, 27,480 Rocket 3/Tridents were produced during its seven-year history.

== Development ==
The Triumph Trident was designed by Bert Hopwood and Doug Hele. The Trident's three-cylinder design was developed from Triumph's 1959 5TA unit-construction 500 cc parallel-twin (which had origins in Edward Turner's 1937 Triumph Speed Twin). Following Triumph practice, the Trident's OHV pushrod engine has separate camshafts for the inlet and exhaust valves.

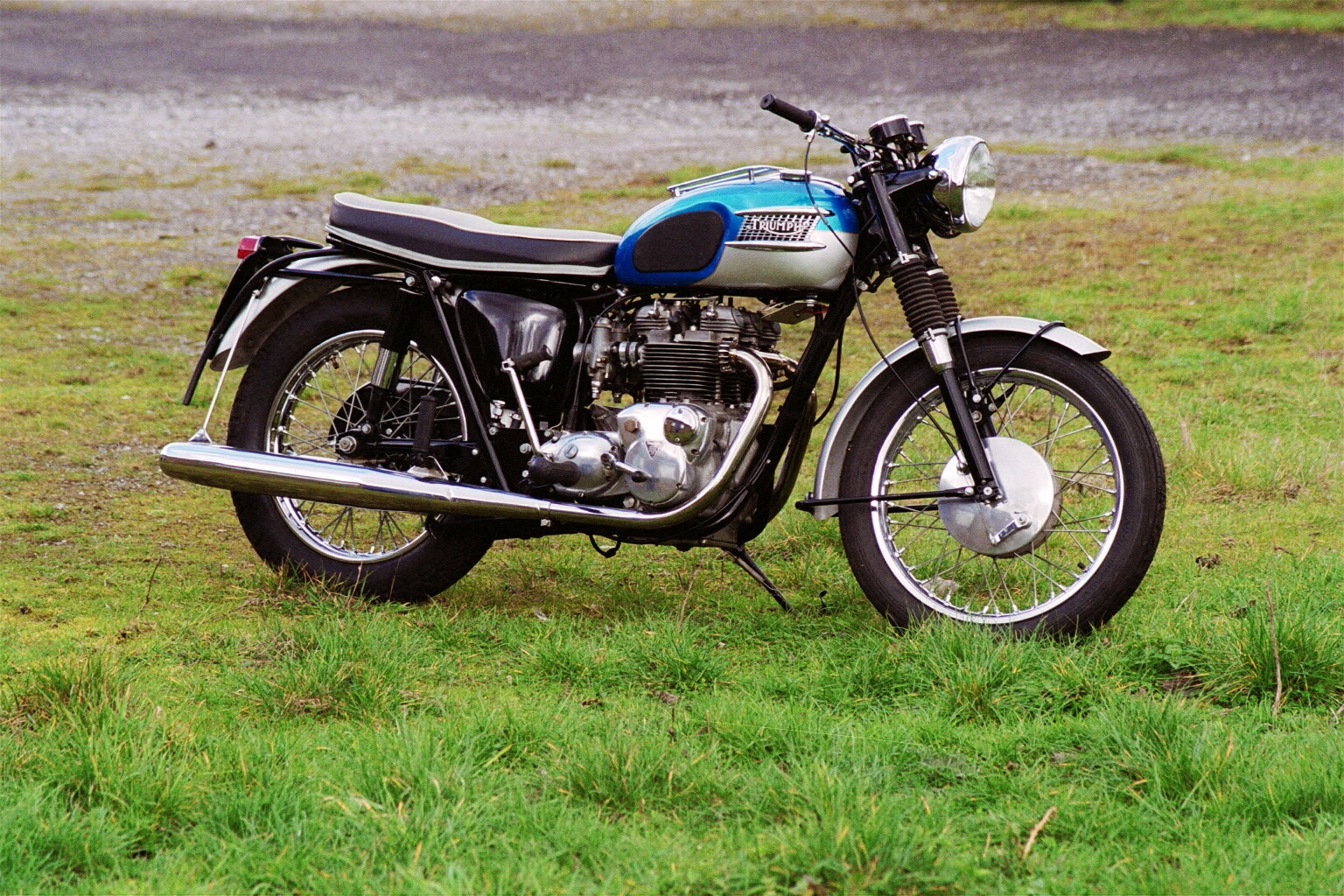
Prototype Triumph Trident P1, which was on display at the London Motorcycle Museum

Although the prototype was ready by 1965, the factory delayed for years for a cosmetic redesign which meant that its eventual introduction was overshadowed by the visually more modern and technologically superior Honda CB750, introduced in 1969.

Unlike the CB750 and other Japanese superbikes which had horizontally split crankcases, the Trident engine was essentially a vertically split parallel twin with a separate central chamber to accommodate the third cylinder. Whereas the Speed Twin was a traditional British twin with a 360° crankshaft, this new triple had crankpins offset 120° and so inherently had much smoother primary balance, albeit with a rocking couple. Although most British motorcycles used a wet multiplate clutch, this triple had a dry single-plate clutch in a housing between the primary chaincase and the gearbox. Mounted on the end of the gearbox mainshaft (where the clutch would be expected) was a large transmission shock-absorber.

Test engineers developed the chassis' handling characteristics by affixing lead weights on a standard 650 Bonneville. The first prototype (P1) was running by 1965, and it seemed that Triumph might have a machine in production by 1967. However, the decision to produce a BSA version with sloping cylinders and employ Ogle Design to give the early Tridents/Rocket 3s their "square tank" added bulk and 40 lb (18 kg) of weight, delaying production by 18 months. In 1966 a P2 prototype was produced with a more production-based Trident engine, different bore and stroke dimensions and improved cooling. Hele got 90 bhp (67 kW) from a Trident engine, leading to speculation that further development might have led to a 140 mph (230 km/h) British superbike.

All the three-cylinder engines (and the Rocket 3 motorcycles) were produced at BSA's Small Heath site, but final assembly of the Triumph Trident model was carried out at Meriden in Coventry. The major differences were the engine and frame: the BSA had an A65-style double-loop cradle frame (with engine mounted at a slant), while the Triumph had a Bonneville-style single downtube frame with vertical cylinders. Other differences were cosmetic. Though the badges on the actual bike said Rocket 3, the BSA-branded bike's name was styled in print as Rocket III in BSA's own advertising, but in third party media it was printed as Rocket 3, or sometimes Rocket Three. Triumphs sold better in the US, despite BSA's Daytona racing successes during the early 1970s. Sales did not meet expectations; for the 1971 model year a fifth gear was added, creating the BSA A75RV and Triumph T150V. BSA were having financial difficulties, and only some 205 five-speed Rocket 3s were built before production of the BSA variant ceased. Production of the five-speed Triumph T150V (with a front disc brake replacing the original drum) continued until 1974.

For the 1975 model year, the Trident was updated to the T160 which was given electric starting, front and rear disc brakes, and a left-foot gear change. Like the Rocket 3, the T160 also featured a forward-slanted cylinder block, which gave better weight distribution and more space behind the engine for ancillaries.

== Reception ==
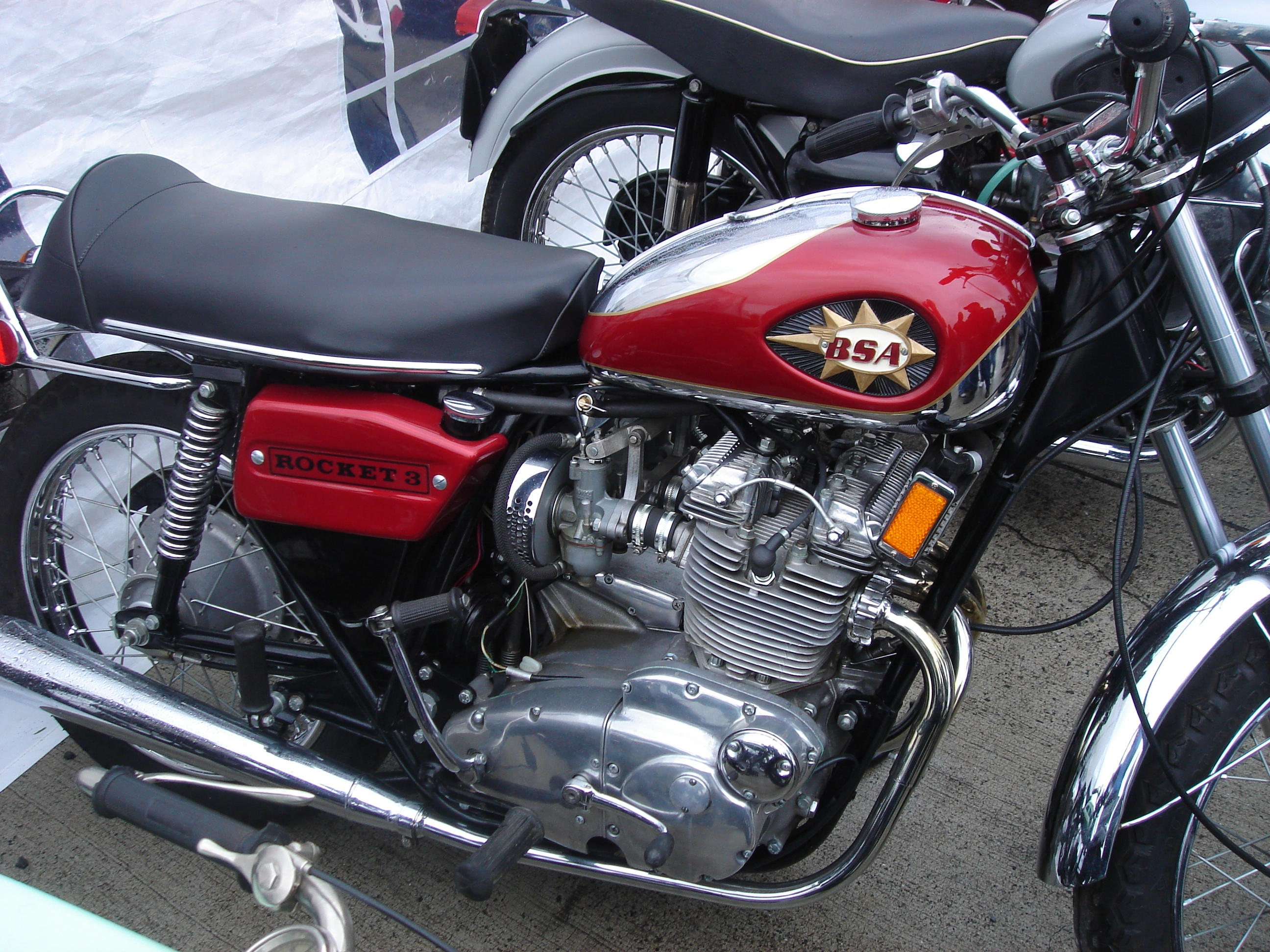
BSA Rocket 3, restyled for 1971

The prototype triples had the "Triumph look", with a teardrop-shaped tank. BSA/Triumph then commissioned Ogle Design for a redesign, leading to an 18-month delay. The new motorcycle had a squarer fuel tank and a less-traditional look, with sloped cylinders and "ray-gun" silencers.

The Rocket 3/Trident was introduced in summer of 1968 to critical acclaim, but was eclipsed four weeks later by the Honda CB750. Compared to the British triple, the CB750 had a five-speed gearbox, overhead camshaft, oil-tight engine, electric start and a disc brake. The Honda outsold the Triumph in the US market; in 1970, to revive sales Triumph restyled export versions with the "classic" look.

In 1968 the new triples disappointed the American BSA-Triumph management, who knew that Honda had a motorcycle under development. They felt the price of $1,800 (£895) was too high, and technical details (like vertically split crankcases and a pushrod OHV valve train were too conventional. However, they acknowledged that the bike was fast and the US sales team launched it by setting speed records at Daytona (which were only broken in 1971 by the Kawasaki Z1).

Cycle World recorded a top speed of 117.03 mph (188.34 km/h) in their 1968 road test, along with acceleration times of 0 to 60 mph (0 to 97 km/h) of 5.6 seconds and 0 to 1/4 mi (0.00 to 0.40 km) in 13.71 seconds at 98.46 mph (158.46 km/h). The magazine's braking test was 60 to 0 mph (97 to 0 km/h) in 157.0 ft (47.9 m), and the fuel consumption was 20.3 mpg_{‑US} (11.6 L/100 km; 24.4 mpg_{‑imp}).

== Triumph X-75 Hurricane ==
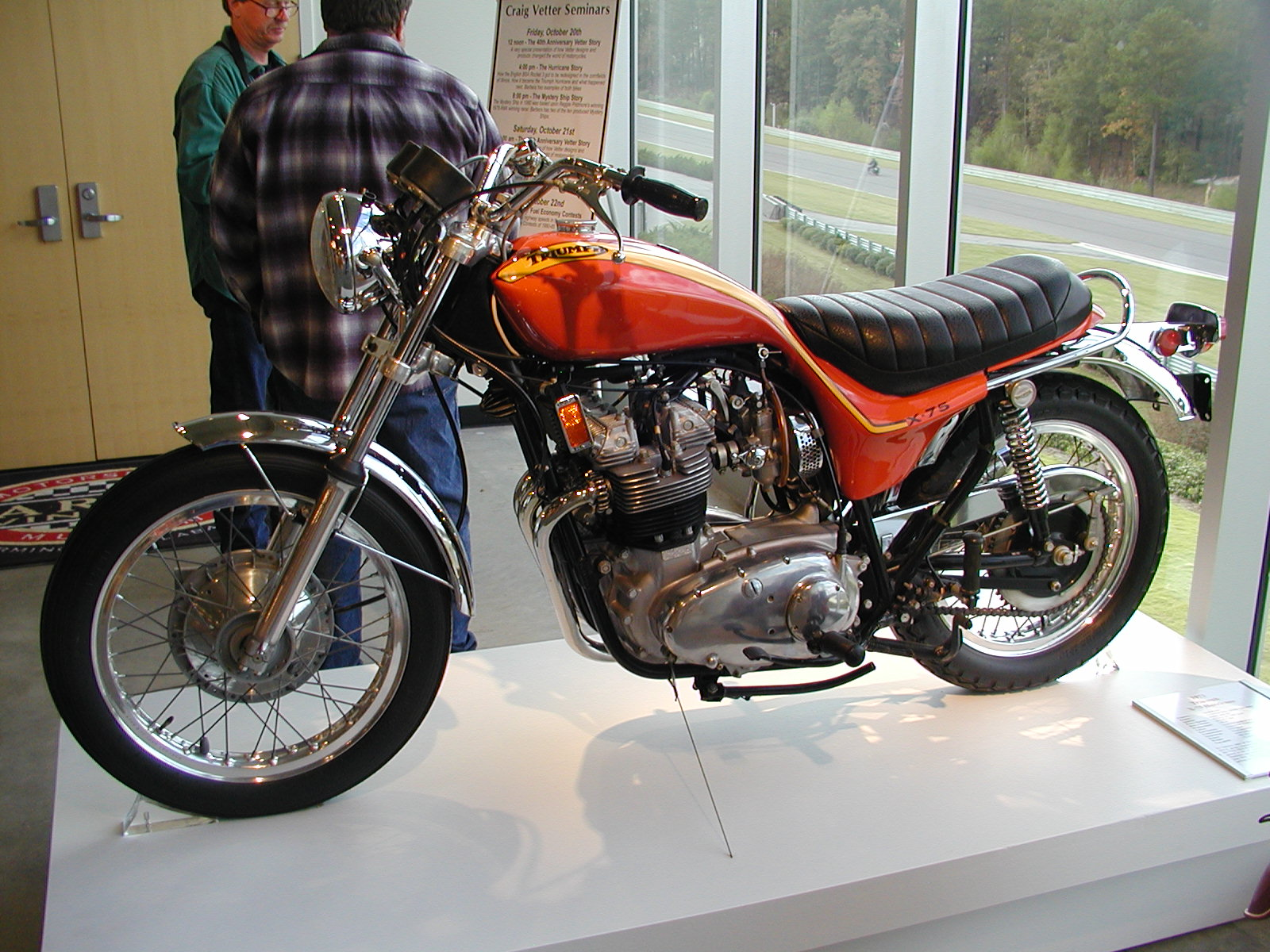
Triumph X-75 Hurricane

US BSA vice-president Don Brown felt that the BSA/Triumph triples needed a different look to succeed in the US. He commissioned designer Craig Vetter to redesign the BSA A75 (making it sleeker and better balanced) and disclosed the Vetter project to Peter Thornton (president of BSA/Triumph North America). In October 1969, Vetter displayed his customised A75. The bike was then sent to the UK, where it received a lukewarm reception from chief designer Bert Hopwood (but a favourable public reaction); the Vetter BSA Rocket 3 became the Triumph X-75 Hurricane.

== Model T160 ==
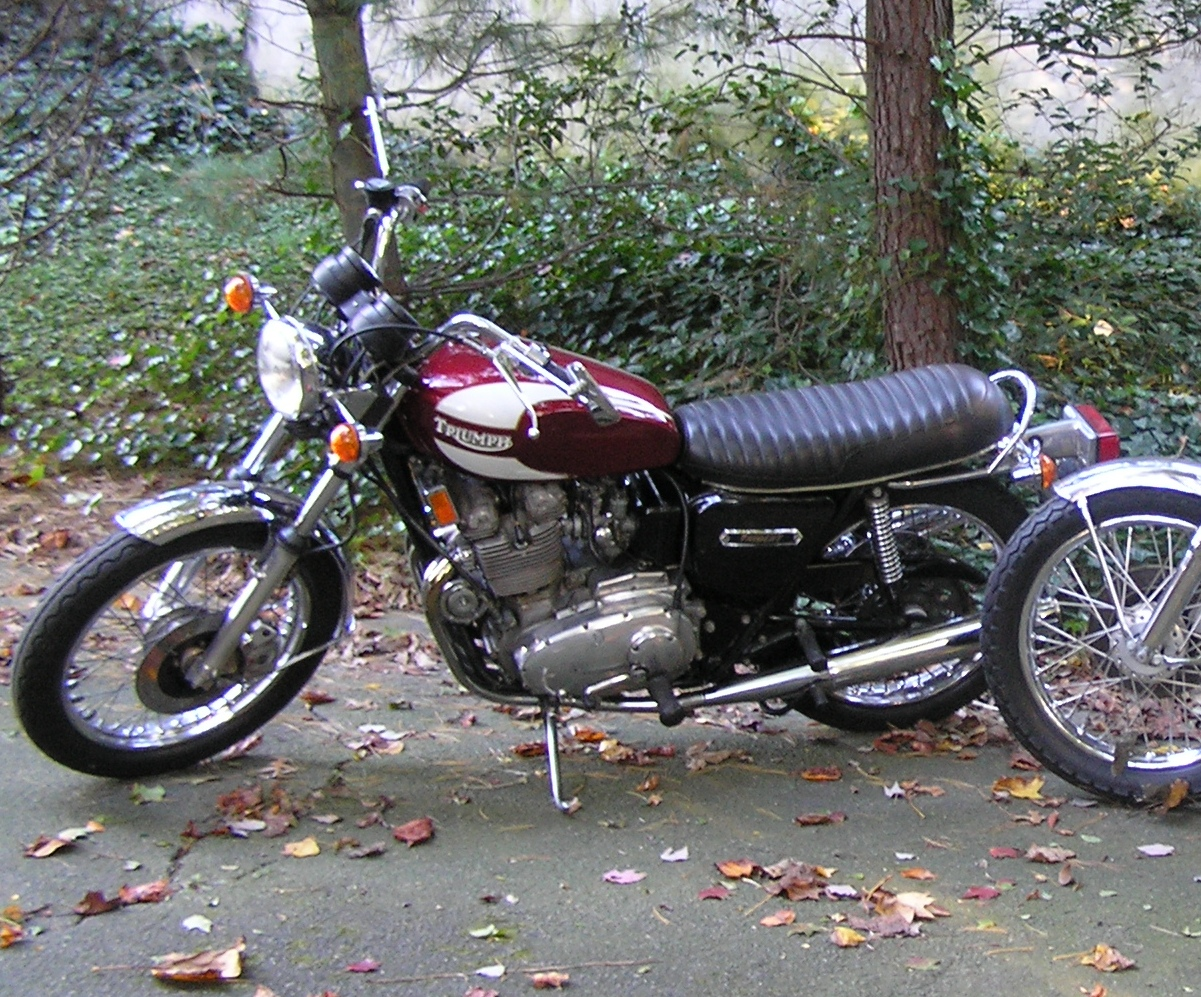
1975 Trident T160 with electric starting, front and rear disc brakes and left-foot gear change

In November 1974, the T150V was succeeded by the modified T160. Some changes were due to market response to the earlier Tridents; others complied with American safety legislation. With forward-sloping cylinders (like the BSA Rocket 3), electric start and a left-hand gearshift, NVT made a final effort to save large-scale production and reduce the gap between the Trident and the Honda CB750. The T160 was manufactured for a little over a year, with production ending in early 1976 (when NVT collapsed). Around 7,000 T160 models were built for the 1975 model year; due to slow sales some were still being sold as late as the end of 1977.

Changes on the T160:

- Forward-leaning cylinder layout derived from BSA Rocket 3 (allowing a larger air box)
- Improved centre of gravity
- Electric start
- Five-speed gearbox (first used on the T150V)
- Left-side foot gear shift (US safety requirement)
- Front and rear disc brakes
- Annular silencers (to meet lower US noise-level requirement)
- Redesigned instrument panel and handlebar switchgear
- Return to traditional Triumph styling

== Cardinal ==
In December 1975 final shipments of 288 and 224 motorcycles were destined for Australia and the US, respectively, but NVT diverted them to fill an order from the Saudi Arabian police force. Most UK police had switched to BMW motorcycles, but a few (such as the Yorkshire Constabulary) still used the Trident. About 450 bikes were sent to Saudi Arabia; the last 130 were still in the UK when the Saudis cancelled the remainder of the order, and NVT Motorcycles sold them as the Triumph Cardinal. At the time, the list price of a stock T160 was £1,215; although the "police accessories" were worth only £150, NVT listed the Cardinal for £1,522.80. In 1982, European dealers imported about 180 low-mileage Tridents from Saudi Arabia; the poorly maintained, sand-encrusted machines were restored and sold as standard T160s.

== Quadrant ==
The Triumph Quadrant was designed and built by Doug Hele in 1973. It was a 1,000 cc four-cylinder motorcycle made from Trident parts (although the camshaft was sourced outside the factory). The fourth cylinder resulted from grafting an extra mid-crankcase unit; since the primary chaincase and final drive sprocket could not be moved, the fourth cylinder protruded from the right side of the bike.

Why Hele developed this machine is unknown, since the lopsided design could never compete with Japanese motorcycles such as the Honda CB750 or the Kawasaki Z1. An inside view is that Hele's efforts were a waste of resources that, with NVT's precarious finances, should have been directed to marketing the 900 cc triple Thunderbird III.

== Model T180 Thunderbird III ==
In 1975 an NVT prototype 870 cc triple, the T180 Triumph Thunderbird III, was developed but it did not reach production. NVT passed on the prototype to the Meriden co-operative, which also did not proceed to production (despite experimenting with the engine in an oil-bearing frame).

A prototype "Norton 900 Commando" was also built with the T180 engine in a Norton Commando frame.

== Racing ==
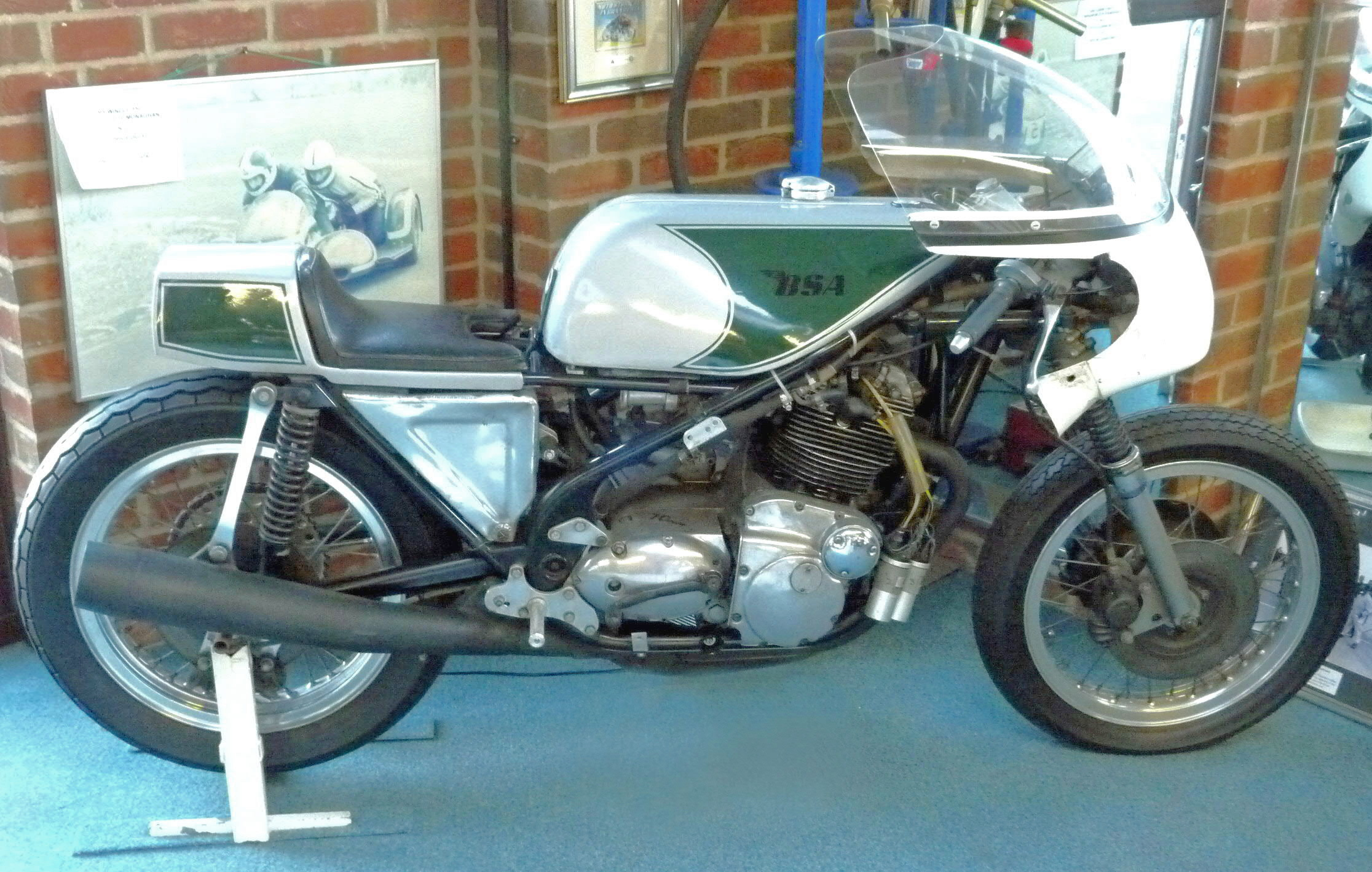
Rob North framed BSA Rocket 3 F750 class at the Sammy Miller Museum

Doug Hele continued to develop the engine, and in 1971 joined frame expert Rob North to produce the Formula 750 racing machines. At the 1971 Daytona 200 the British three-cylinder bikes took the top three places; Dick Mann won on a BSA Rocket 3, followed by Gene Romero on a Triumph Trident and Don Emde third on another BSA Rocket 3. John Cooper rode a BSA Rocket 3 to an upset victory over 500 cc world champion Giacomo Agostini in the 1971 Race of the Year at Mallory Park. Cooper finished three-fifths of a second ahead of Agostini's MV Agusta.

The best-known bike was a production-class Trident prepared by a team led by Les Williams called Slippery Sam, a roadster prepared for production-class road racing to controlled specifications using selected adaptations only, available from the factory as part-numbered inventory. Williams' team won consecutive 750 cc production races at the Isle of Man TT for the five years between 1971 and 1975, and in the new F750 event for race-specification machines, Triumph and BSA machines with Rob North frames placed first and second. Bert Hopwood recommended a production version of the racing triple, producing 84 bhp (63 kW) at 8,250 rpm, but his suggestion was not adopted. Further racing development was done in Duarte, California under racing manager Dan Macias.

Tom Mellor set four world speed records at the Bonneville Salt Flats in September 2008 with a 1969 Triumph Trident T150.

== End of production ==
Financial and management problems at BSA and the disintegration of the British motorcycle industry during the early 1970s led to a government-sponsored merger, "NVT", in July 1973 with Norton. Although Norton was very much smaller than BSA-Triumph, and it had only one product, the ageing pre-unit Commando, nevertheless control of NVT was given to Dennis Poore, the boss of Norton. Poore was much more "in tune" with motorbikes than were the BSA management, but Poore's business plan proved to be an asset-strip of BSA for Manganese-Bronze, rather than a consolidation of the remnants of the UK motorcycle industry. NVT's restructuring plans triggered a strike at Triumph's Meriden factory in September 1974. Production of the Trident was eventually transferred to BSA's Small Heath factory in March 1974, but the lengthy labour dispute disrupted production, and very few Small Heath Tridents came into being.

The last machine off the assembly line at Small Heath, a police-specification Triumph Trident for Saudi Arabia, was produced on 18 December 1975.

== Later use of Trident and Rocket names ==
After Triumph at Meriden collapsed, a new firm, Triumph Motorcycles Ltd, was established at Hinckley. The new firm manufactured from 1990 a new range of motorcycles with a modular engine design. Some of these bikes were called "Triumph Tridents"; and much later a "Triumph Rocket III" was produced.

== See also ==
- List of Triumph motorcycles
- List of BSA motorcycles
