= Downhill, Cornwall =

Hamlet in England

Coordinates: 50.483°N 5.016°W

Downhill
- Location within Cornwall
- OS grid reference: SW861691
- Civil parish: St Eval
- Unitary authority: Cornwall
- Ceremonial county: Cornwall
- Region: South West
- Country: England
- Sovereign state: United Kingdom
- Post town: Wadebridge
- Postcode district: PL27

Downhill is a hamlet in the parish of St Eval, Cornwall, England.
