= Malcolm Uphill =

Welsh motorcycle racer

- Uphill in 1965 when he achieved a double win in the 350 cc 'Junior' Manx Grand Prix and 500 cc 'Senior' races in the Isle of Man
- Nationality: Welsh
- Born: April 15, 1935; Caerphilly, Wales
- Died: August 15, 1999 (age 64); Caerphilly, Wales
Motorcycle racing career statistics
Grand Prix motorcycle racing
Active years	1968–1970
First race	1968 Isle of Man 250cc Lightweight TT
Last race	1970 Isle of Man 350cc Junior TT
Starts / Wins / Podiums / Poles / F. laps / Points; 10 / 0 / 1 / 0 / 0 / 26

Malcolm Ernest Uphill (15 April 1935–15 August 1999) was a Welsh professional motorcycle racer. He competed in British national-level short-circuit and in Grand Prix motorcycle racing. Uphill was the first competitor in the Isle of Man Tourist Trophy races to achieve a 100 mph average lap speed on a production motorcycle.

== Motorcycle racing career ==
A native of Caerphilly, Wales, Uphill later lived at Heol, Trecastle and was educated at Twyn Secondary Modern School. Apprenticed at the Rhymney former railway works near Caerphilly, he worked as a fitter/turner/erector for British Rail. In 1965, Uphill achieved a double win in the 350 cc 'Junior' and 500 cc 'Senior' races at the Manx Grand Prix. His best season in world championship competition was in 1968 when he finished in ninth place in the 250cc world championship.

In 1969, Uphill teamed with Percy Tait to win the Thruxton 500 endurance race for production (road-based) machines and at the 1969 Isle of Man TT, Uphill won the 750 Production class on a Triumph Bonneville with a 100 mph lap, which prompted renaming of the Dunlop K81 motorcycle tyre as the TT100. He also won the 750 Production class at the 1970 North West 200 held in Northern Ireland. Uphill rode a Triumph Trident to win the massed-start 1970 TT 750 production class, after Peter Williams (Norton) ran out of petrol while leading the race, allowing Uphill to pass him mere yards from the finish line.

Uphill died aged 64 in 1999 of asbestosis. In 2011 a pub named The Malcolm Uphill was opened by Wetherspoons in Caerphilly town centre, and in 2013, following local fundraising, a bronze plaque dedicated to Uphill's memory was installed on a wall close to the pub location at Station Terrace.

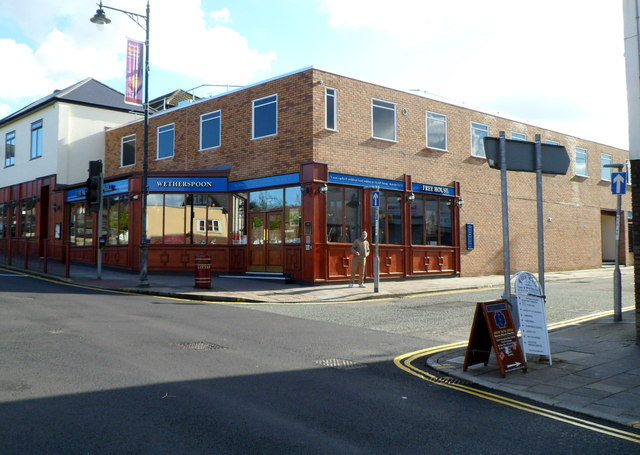
The Malcolm Uphill pub, opened in 2011 on the corner of Cardiff Road and Clive Street in the centre of Caerphilly

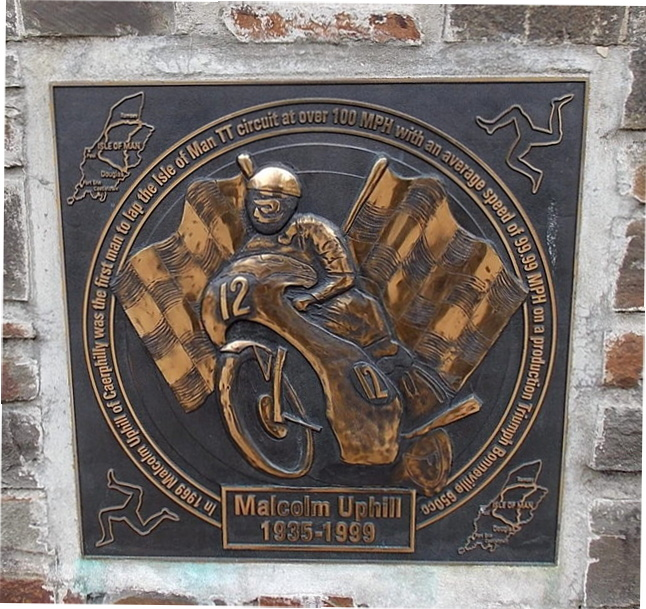
Commemorative plaque installed into a wall during 2013 at Station Terrace, Caerphilly
