= Ray Pickrell =

British motorcycle racer

- Pickrell in 1965
- Born: 16 March 1938; Harrow Weald, Middlesex
- Died: 20 February 2006 (aged 67)
- Occupations: photo-retoucher, racing motorcyclist, driver
- Known for: Isle of Man TT winner

Raymond Pickrell (16 March 1938 – 20 February 2006) was an English short-circuit motorcycle road racer who won four Isle of Man TT motorcycle races.

Pickrell was born in Harrow Weald, Middlesex.

During his early career, Pickrell rode for tuners/race entrants Francis Beart, Geoff Monty and Paul Dunstall.

As a member of the Triumph factory racing team, Pickrell rode the famous racing motorcycle named Slippery Sam to victories at the 1971 and 1972 Isle of Man TT races. Pickrell teamed with Percy Tait to win the 1971 Bol d'Or 24-hour endurance race. He died on 20 February 2006.
