= Triumph Bonneville T120 =

British motorcycle

Triumph Bonneville T120 650
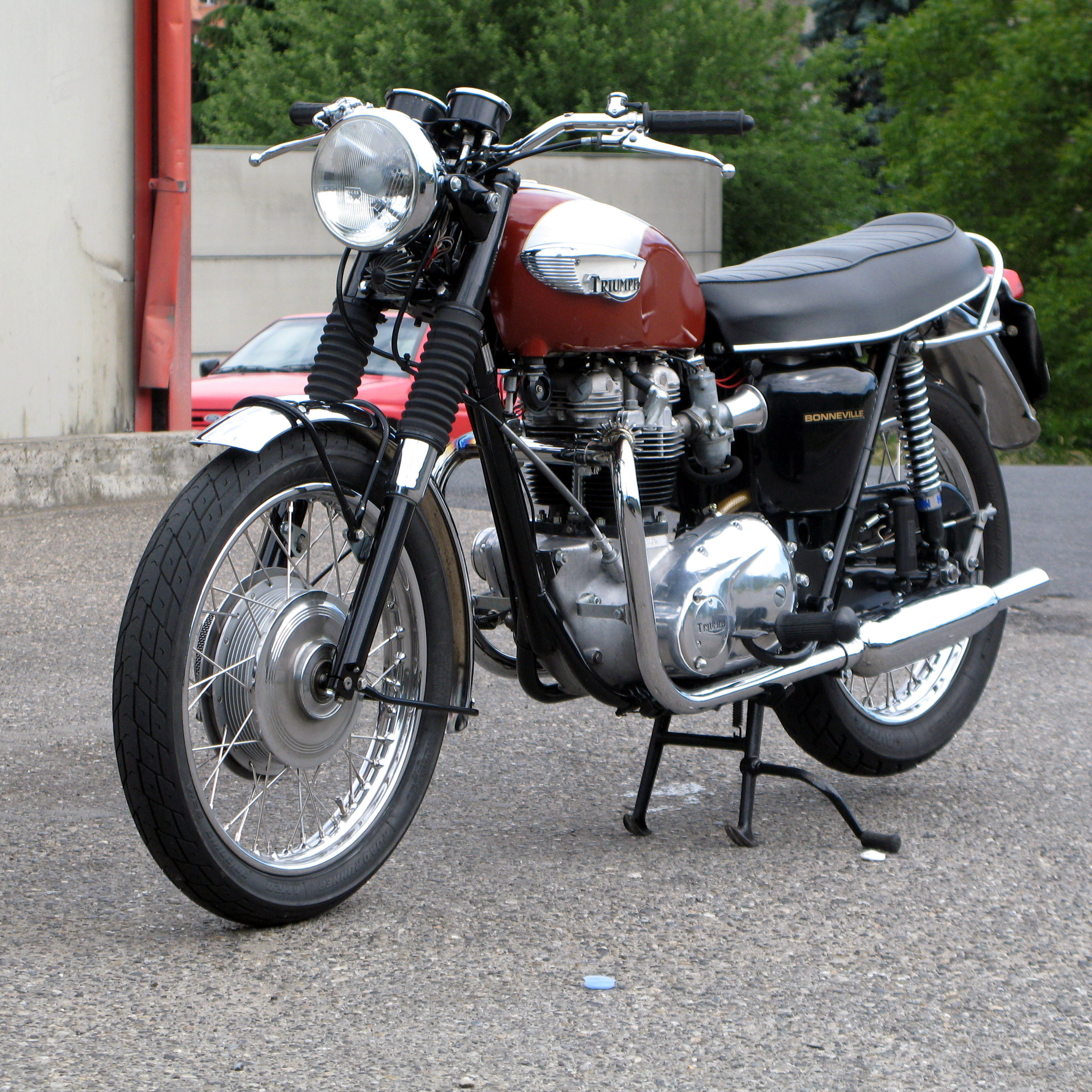
- Manufacturer: Triumph Engineering
- Production: 1959–1975
- Engine: 649 cc (39.6 cu in) air-cooled, ohv 360° parallel-twin
- Bore / stroke: 71 mm × 82 mm (2.8 in × 3.2 in)
- Compression ratio: 8.5:1
- Top speed: 108 mph (174 km/h)
- Power: 46 bhp (34 kW) @ 6,500 rpm
- Torque: 37.8 lb⋅ft (51 N⋅m) @ 5,500 rpm
- Ignition type: Lucas K2F magneto, battery and coil from 1964
- Transmission: 4-speed gearbox (and later 5-speed) with chain final drive
- Tyres: 3.25x19 front, 4.00x18 rear, 3.25x18 and 3.50x18 from 1964
- Wheelbase: 55 in (1,400 mm)
- Seat height: 30.5 in (770 mm)
- Weight: 402 lb (182 kg) (wet)

The Triumph Bonneville T120 is a motorcycle originally made by Triumph Engineering from 1959 to 1975. It was the first model of the Bonneville series, which was continued by Triumph Motorcycles Ltd. The T120 was discontinued in favour of the larger 750 cc T140 in the early 1970s.

== Development ==
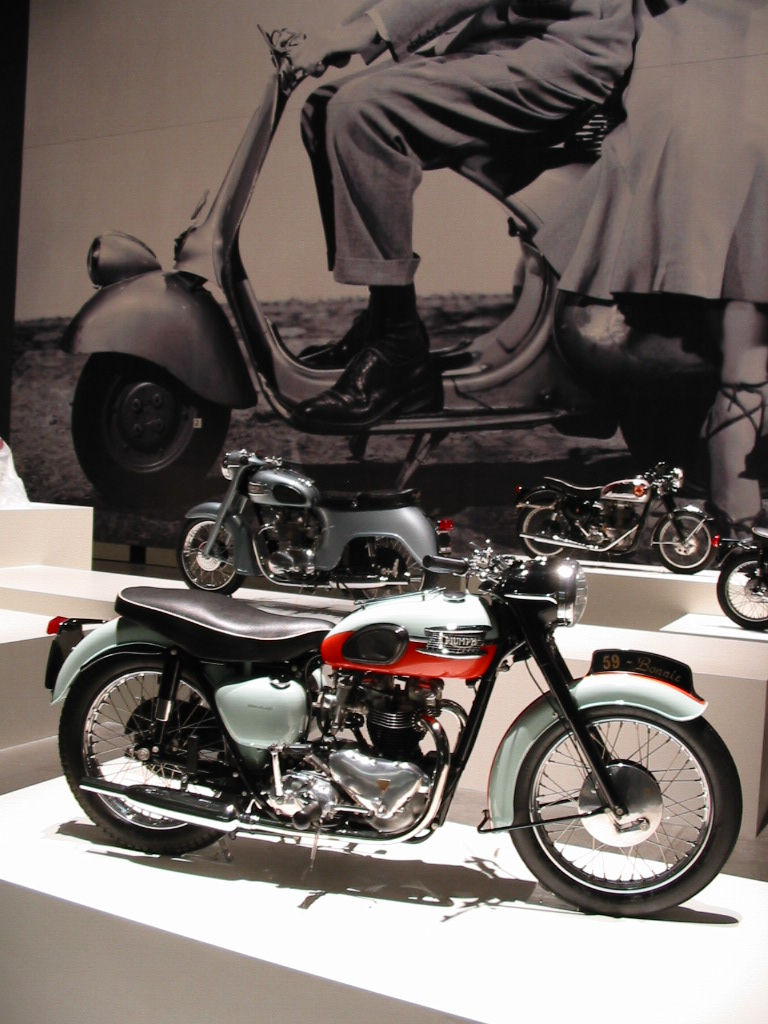
1959 Triumph T120 Bonneville at The Art of the Motorcycle exhibition, Las Vegas

The Bonneville T120 was Edward Turner's last production design at Triumph (in retirement Turner designed the Triumph Bandit/BSA Fury, which did not pass the prototype stage before BSA went under). The new motorcycle was conceived and developed so quickly that it was not included in the 1959 Triumph catalogue. With a 649 cc (39.6 in^{3}) parallel-twin (two-cylinder) engine the T120 was based on the Triumph Tiger T110, and was fitted with the Tiger's optional twin 1 3/16 in Amal Monobloc carburettors as standard, along with that model's high-performance inlet camshaft. Launched in 1959 by Triumph as "The Best Motorcycle in the World", the Bonneville T120 was aimed mainly at the lucrative US market, where enthusiasts were demanding extra performance.

Initially produced with a pre-unit construction engine which enabled the bike to achieve 115 mph (185 km/h) without further modification, the power tended to induce high speed wobbles from the single downtube frame, so in 1963 a stiffer and more compact unit construction model was introduced, with additional bracing at the steering head and swinging arm. The steering angle was altered and improved forks were fitted a couple of years later, which, together with the increased stiffness enabled overall performance to match that of the Bonneville's rivals.

In 1967 Triumph posted its most successful year in the United States with an estimated 28,000 T120s sold. In 1968 the T120 gained a new and more reliable ignition system. From 1971, T120 models used a new frame which contained the engine oil instead of using a separate tank (this became known as the oil in frame/'OIF' version). A five-speed gearbox finally was fully available by 1972, but competition from larger-capacity motorcycles led to the T120 being superseded by the 750 cc Bonneville T140.

Production of the 650 continued until 1973, when the workers at Triumph's Meriden headquarters staged a sit-in until 1975. In 1974 fewer than 1000 assembled 650cc machines were released by the workers, with another 38 in 1975. Production of the T120 was not resumed following the sit-in, the Meriden Motorcycle Co-Operative created after the dispute concentrating upon the 750cc twins instead.

== T120 export models ==
- T120R

Export model intended for the US market with varying differences.

- T120V

5-speed model available 1972.

- T120C TT Special

Competition model with low or high-level exhaust pipes (West or East coast), no mufflers, no gauges, no lights. ET ignition with no battery, Large Amal Monobloc carburetors, 11:1 pistons and dedicated to racing only.

- T120TT Special

For late 1966-1967 Similar spec to the previous T120C TT Specials, but with lower compression, smaller Amal concentric carburetors, altered steering geometry and fitted with standard street Bonneville parts.

1964 model of the T120C for the US East Coast. In 1968 Evel Knievel jumped the Caesar's Palace Casino fountains on a Bonneville T120TT, and was seriously injured breaking many bones after losing control on landing.

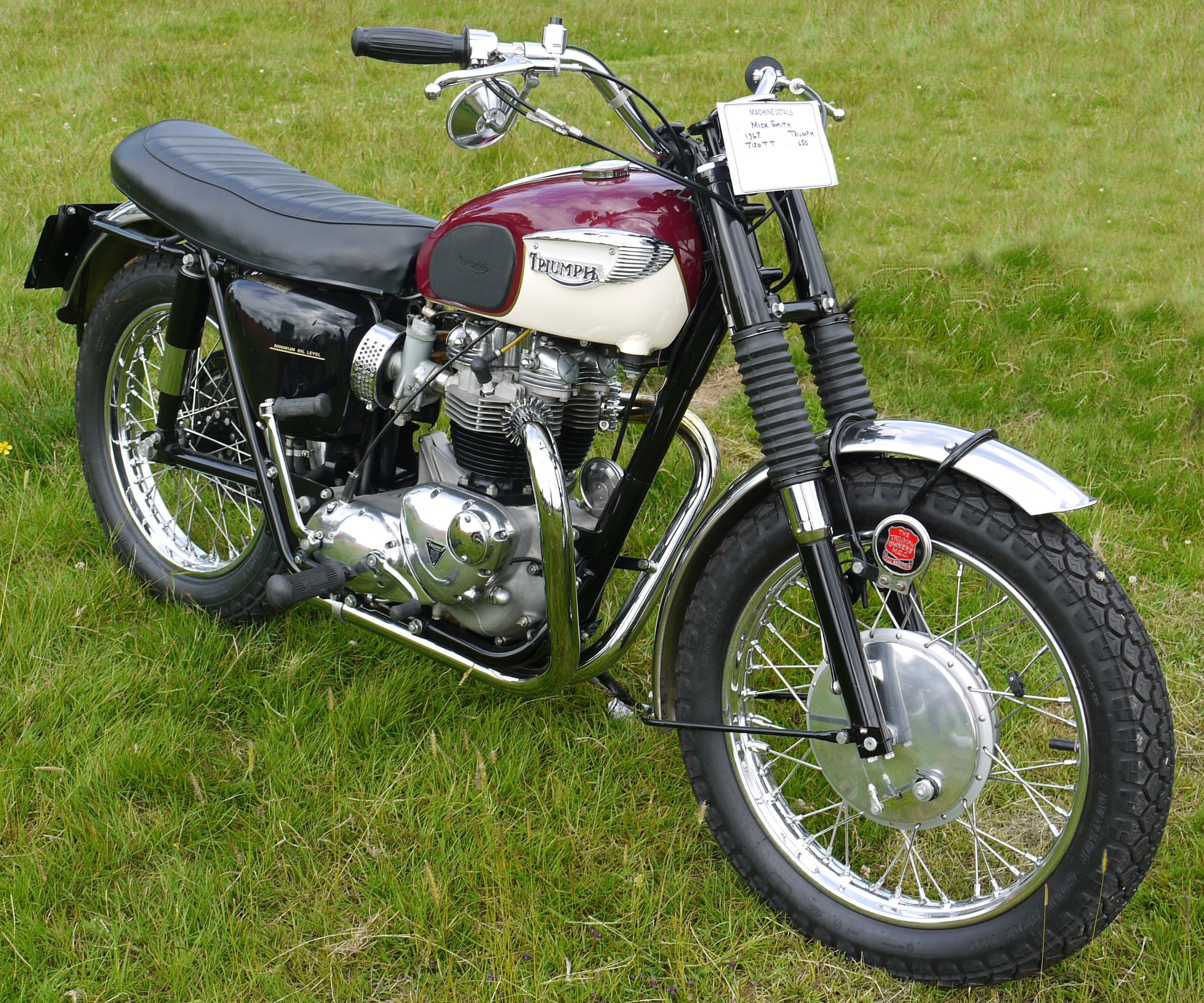
1967 Triumph T120TT

- T120RT

A special 750 cc model which had Routt 750cc cylinder kits installed in America by Triumph to permit them to be used in American Motorcycle Association production-based racing events. The kits were installed on new T120R models while still crated. To qualify, motorcycles had to be made and sold to the public in the same form as they would be raced. Triumph had to produce and sell at least 200 of them before they qualified, and although the exact number sold is not recorded they did meet the requirement. The T was stamped separately on the engine cases in America after the stock T120R when the modifications were made, the frames were not stamped.

- T120RV

The 5-speed is generally considered to have been available—and was advertised as such—starting in 1972 with the T120V. However, a small pre-production run of 5-speeds were made in June 1971 only, and sold as '71 models. They were externally identical to their '71 T120R 4-speed counterparts, and did not carry any "V" decals such as the 1972 5-speeds displayed on their side panels. They were factory (not dealer) modified T120R models, so their engines/frames/and titles are designated T120RV, with the V being stamped separately when the transmissions were installed.

These early factory Triumph 5-speeds are not to be confused with the Quaife 5-speeds that were listed as stocked for sale by Triumph dealers in 1970 to qualify for AMA purposes (the parts "had to be available from Triumph"). The first and final T120RV ratios in 1971 were the same as the 4-speed model, making it a matter of closer ratios, unlike later 5-speeds. These 5-Speeds were not advertised, were not available as an option, and could not be ordered—as the few manufactured were simply distributed individually to selected Triumph dealers and sold by word of mouth.

== Racing success ==
The first race the Triumph Bonneville participated in was the 1959 Thruxton 500. Entered by Triumph dealers including Alec Bennet and Kings Motors (run by owner Stan Hailwood, Mike Hailwood's father) with bikes supplied from the factory, in this first race they finished 2nd, with riders Tony Godfrey/John Holder (behind a BMW) and 4th, riders Arthur Burton/Charles Erskine; the beginning of a successful era of Triumph motorcycle racing.

In 1962 Tony Godfrey and John Holder rode T120 Bonnevilles to victory in the Thruxton 500 mile endurance race, and an article in The Motor Cycle entitled "Thruxton Triumph by Bonneville" led to the development of the Triumph T120R 'Thruxton', which was hand-built by a team of Triumph technicians using specially picked components and precision-machined cylinder heads and crankcases. Peak power was increased and each 'Thruxton' engine was bench tested to deliver around 53 bhp (40 kW) at 6,800 rpm with a safe rev ceiling of 7,200 rpm. Only 52 of the Thruxton T120Rs were built in 1964/5 to meet homologation requirements for production racing, and surviving examples are rare. About 100 more machines were subsequently manufactured and supplied to selected dealers and riders. Further examples were also built by dealers, with the factory's approval, from factory supplied parts.

The T120 won the Production Isle of Man TT in 1967 and 1969 in the 501–750 cc classification. The re-introduction of the Production TT was in 1967 when John Hartle took first place. Two years later in 1969, Triumph set a new landmark in TT history when Malcolm Uphill averaged 100 mph (160 km/h) around the Mountain Course on a Bonneville. Uphill's achievement was the first time that a production motorcycle had ever passed the three-figure mark from a standing start. Following Uphill's record, the Dunlop K81 tyres he was using were renamed TT100s.

In 1969, Bonneville T120 bikes achieved the first three places in the Thruxton 500. Percy Tait and co-rider Malcolm Uphill finished first, ahead of two other Triumph T120Rs.

In 2012, Marc LaNoue set a Vintage class record at the Pikes Peak International Hill Climb.

== The Bonneville name ==
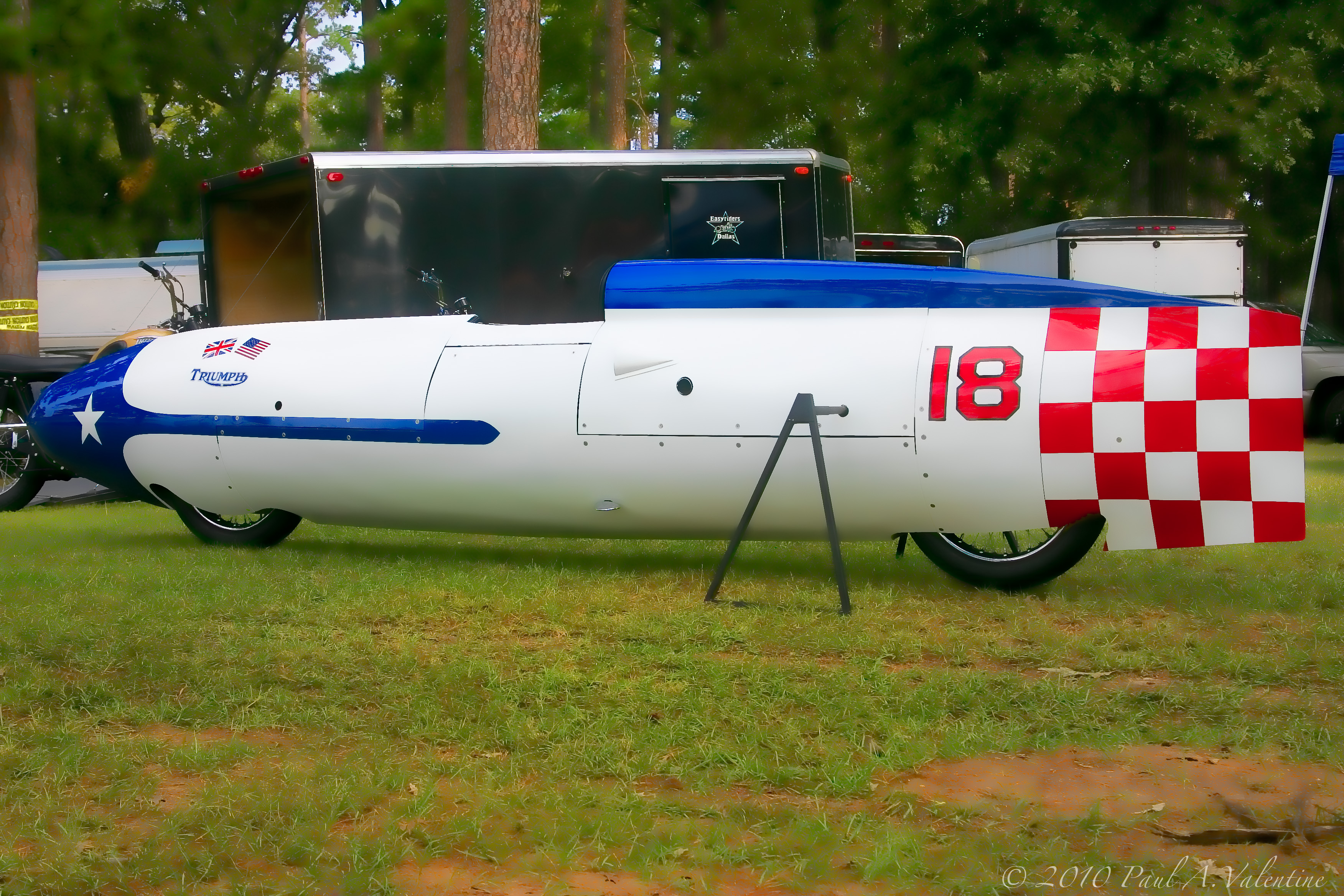
'Devil's Arrow' Triumph streamliner ridden by Johnny Allen to record speeds at Bonneville salt flats in 1955.

The Bonneville name came from the achievements of Texas racer Johnny Allen on the Bonneville Salt Flats in Utah. In September 1955, Allen had achieved a two-way average speed of 193.3 mph (311 km/h) on his special motorcycle the "Devil's Arrow", a 650 cc twin-cylinder Triumph engine fuelled by methanol in a unique 'streamliner' fairing. Allen's speed was ratified as a record by the American Motorcycle Association but not by the world authority, the FIM, as no official observers were present.

German motorcycle firm NSU took the record the following year, so Allen and his team returned to Bonneville in September 1956 and won it back with an average speed of 214.17 mph (344 km/h). The FIM also refused to accept this as a world record but Triumph gained much needed publicity from the legal dispute that followed.

After the Bonneville T120 had been named in recognition of Allen's records, other Triumph-engined motorcycles went faster still on the Salt Flats. In 1962 Bill Johnson set a two-way average of 230.269 mph (370.5 km/h) over a measured mile, riding a 667 cc 'streamliner' whose design was based on the American X-15 rocket plane. In 1966 Detroit Triumph dealer Bob Leppan raised the record to 245.66 mph (395.3 km/h) with his Gyronaut X-1, powered by two 650 cc Triumph engines. For the next few years, Triumph fitted Bonneville roadsters with "World's Fastest Motorcycle" stickers.

== See also ==
- Triumph Bonneville T140
- Les Harris (businessman)
- New Bonneville 800, 900 & 1200
- List of motorcycles of the 1950s
- List of Triumph motorcycles
