= Norton 650 Dominator =

British motorcycle produced from 1962 to 1967

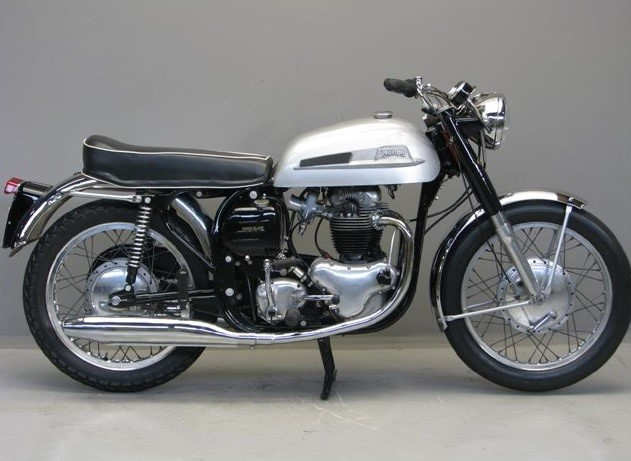
- 1962 Norton 650SS Dominator
- Manufacturer: Norton
- Production: 1962–1967
- Assembly: Bracebridge St, Birmingham; Plumstead, London
- Predecessor: Norton Manxman
- Successor: Norton Mercury
- Engine: 646 cc (39.4 cu in) air-cooled OHV vertical twin
- Bore / stroke: 68 mm × 89 mm (2.7 in × 3.5 in)
- Compression ratio: 8.9:1
- Power: 49 bhp (37 kW) @ 6,800 rpm (650SS)
- Transmission: Wet clutch, 4-speed, chain drive
- Frame type: Featherbed duplex cradle
- Suspension: Front: telescopic forks Rear: swinging arm
- Brakes: Front: 8 in (200 mm) drum, Rear: 7 in (180 mm) drum
- Tyres: 3.00x19 front, 3.50x19 rear
- Wheelbase: 55.5 in (1,410 mm)
- Weight: 434 lb (197 kg) (dry)
- Fuel capacity: 3.5 imp gal (16 L; 4.2 US gal)

The Norton 650 Dominator was a 650 cc vertical twin motorcycle manufactured by the British Norton Motorcycle Company from 1962 to 1967. Initially production was at Norton's Bracebridge St, Birmingham factory, but following the factory's closure in 1963, production was transferred to parent company AMC's works in Plumstead, London. Initially produced in single and twin carburettor versions, the single carb version was soon discontinued. The twin carb version, the 650SS, was described as the 'Best of the Dominators'.

== Background ==
To satisfy the American market desire for larger displacement engines, the 650 cc Manxman was introduced as an export only model in 1961. A European styled version of the Manxman was shown in early 1962 at the Amsterdam International Auto Show and went on sale in April that year as the 650SS. Single carburettor versions of the machine were also produced.

== Model variants ==
The 650 Dominator was initially produced in 3 variants; Standard, De Luxe and Sports Special (SS).

=== 650 Standard ===
The 650 Standard used a single carburettor version of the 650 engine. It was only produced in 1962 and 1963. Following the styling of the 88 and 99 Dominators, the bike was finished in 'Norton Grey' in '62 and polychromatic blue and black in '63.

=== 650 De Luxe ===
A two-tone finished version of the Standard was offered in 1962 only and designated the 650 De Luxe. It was finished in blue and dove grey.

=== 650 Sports Special ===
The 650 Sports Special was the most popular version of the 650 Dominator and was the only variant offered from 1964 to 1967. It used the twin carburettor engine from the Manxman and was finished in black with a silver tank and chrome mudguards. Optional extras included a revcounter and a fairing.

Motor Cycling magazine obtained a best one-way speed of 119.5mph during testing of the 650SS at the MIRA test track in February 1962. A 650SS won the Thruxton 500 in 162, '63 and '64.

== Technical details ==
=== Engine and transmission ===
The 650 Dominator used the engine from the Manxman. The engine had its roots in the 1948 Bert Hopwood 500 cc design first used in the Model 7 Dominator. The air-cooled OHV vertical twin had been enlarged to 600 cc in 1956 to satisfy the demands of the American market for larger engines. Norton's competitors were offering 650 cc machines so the engine was again enlarged to compete. The stroke of the 600 engine was increased from 82 mm (3.2 in) to 89 mm (3.5 in). New crankcases were required for the longer stroke along with a new crankshaft that had wider flywheels and larger big ends. A higher lift camshaft was fitted and compression ratio was 8.9:1.

An alloy cylinder head was fitted that was derived from the 500 Domiracer that Tom Phillis had ridden to third place in the 1961 Isle of Man TT Senior race, and achieved the first 100 mph (160 km/h) lap of the island on a pushrod machine. The head had wide splayed exhaust ports to help cooling airflow over the head and downdraft inlet ports.

A single Amal Monobloc carburettor was fitted to the Standard and De Luxe and twin Monoblocs to the 650SS.

Primary drive was by chain to a multiplate wet clutch and was enclosed in a pressed steel chaincase. The gearbox had four speeds.

=== Cycle parts ===
The combination of slimline featherbed frame and Roadholder forks used on previous Dominators was carried forward to the 650. Alloy hubs containing 8 in (200 mm) front and 7 in (180 mm) rear drum brakes were fitted.
