= Norton Model 99 Dominator =

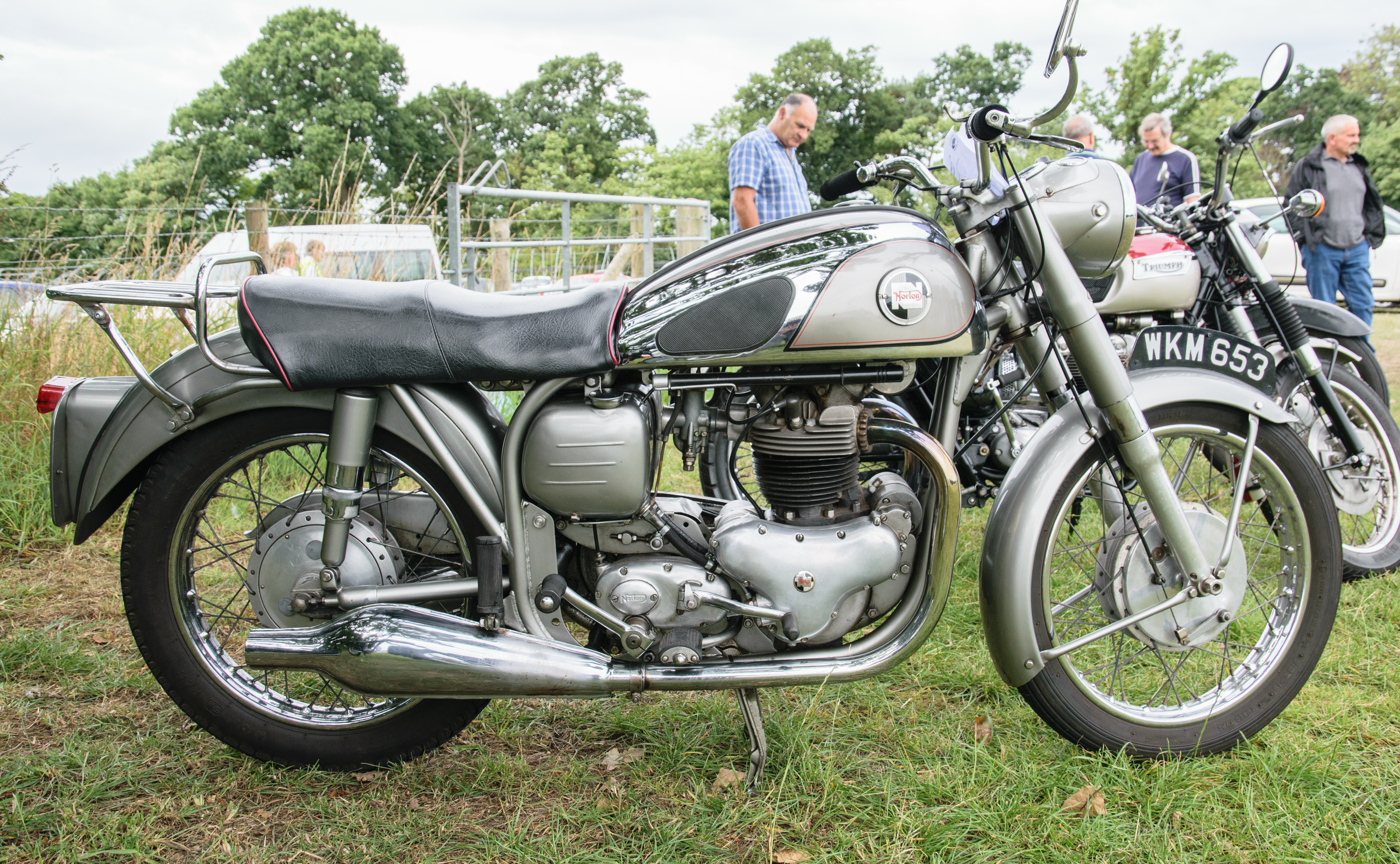
- 1956 99 Dominator
- Manufacturer: Norton
- Production: 1956-1962
- Assembly: Bracebridge St, Birmingham
- Successor: Norton 650SS
- Engine: 597 cc (36.4 cu in) air-cooled OHV vertical twin
- Bore / stroke: 68 mm × 82 mm (2.7 in × 3.2 in)
- Power: 31 bhp (23 kW) @ 5,750 rpm (88); 44 bhp (33 kW) @ 6,750 rpm (88SS)
- Transmission: Wet clutch, 4-speed, chain drive
- Frame type: Featherbed duplex cradle
- Suspension: Front: telescopic forks Rear: swinging arm
- Brakes: drum front & rear
- Wheelbase: 55.5 in (1,410 mm)
- Weight: 390 lb (180 kg) (dry); 410 lb (190 kg) (wet)

The Norton Model 99 Dominator was a 600 cc vertical twin motorcycle manufactured by the British Norton Motorcycle Company at their Bracebridge St, Birmingham factory from 1956 to 1962. The 99 was based on the 500 cc Model 88 Dominator with an enlarged engine. The model was superseded by the 650SS.

== Background ==
Norton had first started exporting to the US in 1949. The Americans were impressed with Norton's racing successes but wanted a twin that was capable of the 'ton' 100 mph (160 km/h). The 88 Dominator was only capable of 90 mph (140 km/h) and was no match for the 650 Triumph Thunderbird and BSA Golden Flash. Norton needed more power for the American market.

Bert Hopwood had designed the 500 cc vertical twin that powered the 88. Hopwood had left Norton and moved to BSA where he redesigned Val Page's earlier twin to produce the 650 cc Golden Flash. Hopwood was back at Norton in 1955 and enlarged his twin engine to 600 cc to produce more power.

== Technical details ==
=== Engine and transmission ===
The 597 cc engine was enlarged from the 88's 500 cc engine by increasing the bore and stroke from 66 mm (2.6 in) x 72.6 mm (2.86 in) to 68 mm (2.7 in) x 82 mm (3.2 in). The pre-unit 360° pushrod vertical twin used cast iron cylinders and an alloy cylinder head with a 7.6:1 compression ratio. Fuel was fed by a single Amal Monobloc carburettor except on the 99SS where twin carbs were fitted.

Ignition was from a Lucas magneto and the power for the lights was from a dynamo. In 1958 this was changed to coil ignition and a crankshaft-mounted alternator. The model reverted to a magneto in 1962.

Primary drive was by chain to a multiplate wet clutch and was enclosed in a pressed-steel chaincase. The gearbox had four speeds. For the 1957 model the gearbox was changed to the AMC gearbox used on AJS and Matchless twins.

=== Cycle parts ===
Cycle parts were shared with the 88. The frame was the featherbed and forks were short Roadholders. Full width alloy hubs were fitted with drum brakes, 8 in (200 mm) at the front and 7 in (180 mm) rear. A 7 in (180 mm) headlight was fitted with the speedo, ammeter and switch mounted in its shell.

The featherbed frame was modified in 1960 by moving the top tubes closer together. The updated frame came to be known as the 'slimline' and the previous version as the 'wideline'.

== Model variants ==
=== 99 ===
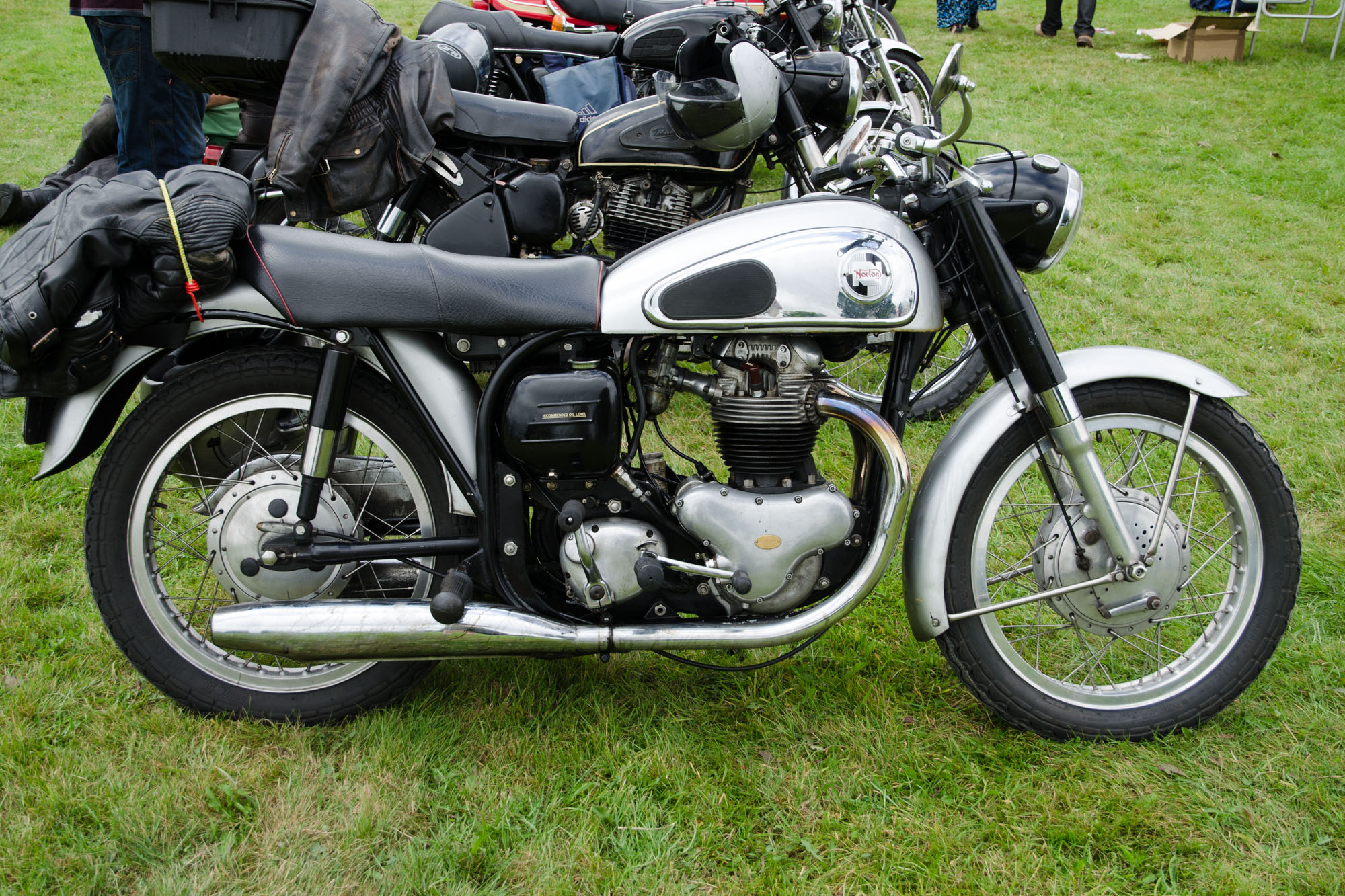
1959 Dominator 99 'Smooth-Look'

The Model 99 was introduced in 1956. Norton updated their range, including the 99, to their new 'Smooth-Look'. Changes included new headlight shells, detachable embellishment panels on the petrol tank, new silencers and front hub. A redesigned cylinder head was also fitted. The Dominator name was revived in 1959 and the model was called the Model 99 Dominator. With the introduction of the 'Bodystyled' Deluxe model, the existing bike became the 88 Standard Dominator. The model was discontinued in 1962 following the introduction of the 650 cc Dominators.

=== 99 De Luxe ===
Norton had first introduced semi-enclosed bodywork in 1958 on the 250 cc Norton Jubilee. The 'Bodystyled' semi-enclosed bodywork was offered as an option on the Dominators in 1960, the De Luxe models. Intended as a tourer, the semi-enclosed bodywork was claimed to keep the rider cleaner and the bodywork was easier to clean than a bare design. A fairing was offered as an optional extra. Many of these models later had the bodywork stripped off to convert the bike to a cafe racer. The model was discontinued in 1962.

=== 99 Sports Special ===
The 99 Sports Special Dominator (99SS) was introduced in 1961 as a higher performance version of the 99. The model had the option of twin Amal Monobloc carburettors, and came with polished inlet ports and a hotter camshaft that had previously been fitted to the Manxman. A siamesed exhaust was fitted, or the option of a dual system and the option of chrome mudguards. Motor Cycle magazine obtained a top speed of 108 mph (174 km/h) during a test of the 99SS. The model was dropped after only a year when the 650SS was introduced in 1962.
