= Navigator (disambiguation) =

A navigator is an individual responsible for guiding a vehicle to its destination.

Navigator may also refer to:

== Technology ==
- Netscape Navigator, a web browser
- Packard Bell Navigator, an alternative shell for Windows 3.1 and Windows 95
- DOS Navigator, a free file manager for DOS and Windows
- TomTom Navigator software
- Navigator Program, a long-term NASA project
- Etak Navigator, precursor of GPS-based automotive navigation systems produced by Etak, Inc.
- Nokia 6110 Navigator, a mobile phone
- Nokia 6210 Navigator, a mobile phone
- Nokia 6710 Navigator, a mobile phone

== Vehicles ==
- Lincoln Navigator, a luxury sport utility vehicle
- Norton Navigator, a motorcycle made from 1960 to 1965
- USS Navigator, two US Navy tugs
- Newbridge Navigator, a type of sailing dinghy
- UC-45J Navigator, a version of the Beechcraft Model 18 aircraft

== Places ==
- Navigator Peak, Ellsworth Land, Antarctica
- Navigator Nunatak, a large nunatak in Aviator Glacier, Victoria Land, Antarctica
- Navigator Islands, early European name for the Samoan Islands

== Music ==
- Navigator Records, a record label
- Navigators (Norwegian band), a pop band
- Navigators (Swedish band), a hip hop band
- ESP Navigator, a brand of ESP guitars

=== Musical works ===
- Navigator (1986 Omega Tribe album), 1986
- Navigator (Aquarium album), 1995
- Navigator (Che Fu album), 2002
- Navigator (Forma Tadre album)
- Navigator (Funker Vogt album), 2005
- Navigator an album by José Padilla (DJ)
- The Navigator (Andrew Cyrille album), 1982
- The Navigator (Hurray for the Riff Raff album), 2017
- The Navigator (Paul McCandless album), 1992
- The Navigator (opera), a 2008 opera by Liza Lim
- "Navigator", a song from the 1985 album Rum Sodomy & the Lash by The Pogues
- "Navigator", a 2020 song by SixTones

== Films ==
- The Navigator (1924 film), a comedy directed by and starring Buster Keaton
- Flight of the Navigator, a.k.a. The Navigator, a 1986 Disney science fiction film
- The Navigator: A Medieval Odyssey, a 1988 New Zealand science fiction movie
- The Navigators (film) a 2001 film by Ken Loach

== Books ==
- The Navigator (Pocalyko novel) (2013), by Michael Pocalyko
- The Navigator (Cussler novel) (2007), by Clive Cussler and Paul Kemprecos
- The Navigator (McNamee novel), by Eoin McNamee
- Navigator (novel) (2007), a novel by Stephen Baxter
- The Navigator (Cramer book), by Zadok Cramer, a guide for settlers moving west through the United States

== Sports teams ==
- Muskogee Navigators were a Western Association baseball team based in Muskogee, Oklahoma, that played from 1909 to 1910
- Navigators (cycling team), a cycling team in the United States
- North Peace Navigators, a Junior "B" ice hockey team based in Peace River, Alberta, Canada
- North Shore Navigators, a collegiate summer baseball team based in Lynn, Massachusetts
- Norwich Navigators, former name of Double A minor league baseball team Connecticut Defenders
- Tacoma Navigators, an American Basketball Association franchise
- Waco Navigators, a Texas League baseball team based in Waco, Texas, that played from 1906 to 1919

== Other uses ==
- The Navigators (organization), a Christian organization
- The Navigator Company, a paper company formerly known as Portucel Soporcel Group
- Navigators USA, a non-aligned scouting organization founded in 2003
- Navigator Ltd, a Canadian public relations and polling company
- Guild Navigator, a type of mutated human in Frank Herbert's Dune universe
- Outdated full form of navvy in UK parlance
- Aviva Navigator, an integrated investment platform by Aviva
- The Navigators, a sculpture in Hay's Galleria in London by David Kemp

== See also ==
- List of people known as the Navigator
- Navigation (disambiguation)
