= Norton Model 88 Dominator =

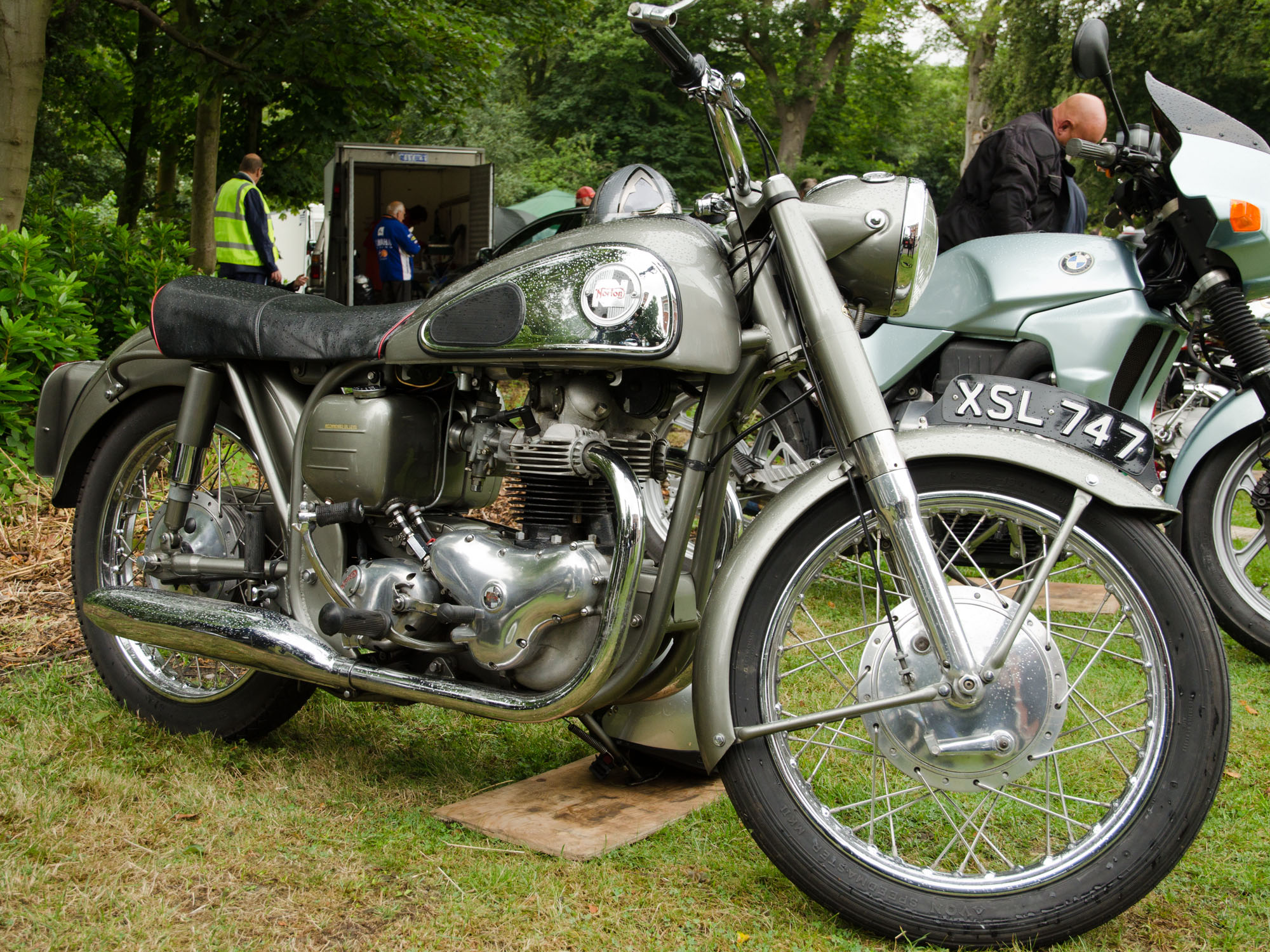
- 1957 Norton Dominator 88
- Manufacturer: Norton
- Production: 1952-1966
- Assembly: Bracebridge St, Birmingham (1952-62); Plumstead, London (1962-66)
- Predecessor: Norton Model 7 Dominator
- Engine: 497 cc (30.3 cu in) air-cooled OHV vertical twin
- Bore / stroke: 66 mm × 72.6 mm (2.60 in × 2.86 in)
- Top speed: 95 mph (153 km/h)
- Power: 29 bhp (22 kW) @ 6,000 rpm 36 bhp (27 kW) @ 7,000 rpm (88SS)
- Ignition type: Lucas magneto
- Transmission: Wet clutch, 4-speed, chain drive
- Frame type: Featherbed duplex cradle
- Suspension: Front: telescopic forks Rear: swinging arm
- Brakes: drum front & rear
- Tyres: 3.00x19 front, 3.50x19 rear
- Wheelbase: 55.5 in (1,410 mm)
- Dimensions: L: 84 in (2,100 mm); W: 26 in (660 mm)
- Seat height: 31 in (790 mm)
- Weight: 380 lb (170 kg) (dry)
- Fuel capacity: 3.5 imp gal (16 L; 4.2 US gal)

The Norton Model 88 Dominator, also originally known as the Dominator De Luxe was a 500 cc vertical twin motorcycle manufactured by the British Norton Motorcycle Company from 1952 to 1966. It was the first of Norton's motorcycles to use the featherbed frame, which established Norton's reputation of producing fine handling machines. The 88 used the Bert Hopwood designed engine that was first fitted to the Model 7 and was initially for export only. It became available on the home market in 1953. Norton were a small manufacturer at the time and without the economies of scale the model was expensive compared to other manufacturer's equivalent machines. The 88 retailed for 20% more than the contemporary Triumph Speed Twin and was dearer than the 650 cc Triumph Thunderbird.

== Technical details ==
=== Engine and transmission ===
The 497 cc Bert Hopwood designed engine from the Model 7 was used in the 88. The pre-unit 360° pushrod vertical twin used cast iron cylinders and head. Ignition was by a magneto mounted behind the engine and power for the lights was supplied by a dynamo. Later models used an alternator and coil ignition.

An alloy cylinder head was introduced in 1955 and various improvements were made to the engine during the model's production run.

Primary drive was by chain to a multiplate wet clutch and was enclosed in a pressed steel chaincase. Oil leaks from the chaincase were a common problem. The gearbox had 4 speeds.

=== Cycle parts ===
Norton had commissioned Belfast racer and engineer Rex McCandless to build a new frame for their Manx racers. The McCandless frame was first used in 1950 and brought many victories for the Norton team and praise from the riders. The landmark design influenced motorcycle chassis design for many years. The 88 used the featherbed frame to provide a sportier road bike, although the road going versions of the frame were made from mild steel tubing rather than the Reynolds 531 tube of the racers. Early frame could distort if bumped into a curb which was resolved by adding a reinforcing gusset. The frame was 30 lb (14 kg) than the ES2 type frame of the Model 7.

Front suspension was short Roadholder forks and rear swinging arm pivoting on Silentbloc bushes. Brakes were 7 in (180 mm) single width drums front and rear although full-width hubs were later fitted.

The first models were finished in Norton's trademark polychromatic grey colour scheme. In 1959 metalescent blue, red and black/silver finishes were offered as options. Two-tone finishes were introduced with the Standard model being offered in red/dove grey, black/dove grey and two-tone grey. The De Luxe was available in red/dove grey, blue/dove grey and green/dove grey. No colour options were offered in 1961, the Standard being finished in two-tone grey and the De Luxe in blue/dove grey. In 1963 the Standard model was offered in green/off-white and the SS in black with a silver tank.

== Model naming and variants ==
The Model 7 Dominator had been introduced in 1949. When the featherbed framed model 88 was introduced it was designated the 'Dominator De Luxe' to differentiate it from the Model 7. In 1956 the 'Dominator' name was dropped and the bike was designated simply as the 'Model 88'.

The Dominator name returned for 1959 with the model being known as the 88 Dominator. In 1960 a new 'body styled' variant was introduced with enclosed rear bodywork. This was known as the Dominator De Luxe and the existing model became the Dominator Standard.

A sports version, the 88 Dominator Sports Special was introduced in 1961. The De Luxe model was discontinued in 1962, the Standard in 1963 and the SS model continued production until October 1966.

Model naming and variants
Model	1952	1953	1954	1955	1956	1957	1958	1959	1960	1961	1962	1963	1964	1965	1966
Standard	88 Dominator De Luxe				88			88 Dominator	88 Dominator Standard						
Enclosed rear bodywork									88 Dominator De Luxe						
Sports										88 Dominator Sports Special (SS)					

=== 88 Sports Special ===
The Sports Special (SS) version of the 88 Dominator was introduced in 1961. Power output was increased to 36 bhp (27 kW) @ 7,000 rpm by using twin 1 1/16" (27mm) Amal Monobloc carburettors, larger 1.4 in (36 mm) inlet valves, the camshaft from the 650 Manxman, 8.5:1 compression ratio and a siamesed exhaust. A test conducted by Motor Cycling at the MIRA testing ground showed the machine capable of reaching the 'ton' (100 mph).

In 1962 the head from the 650SS was fitted in 1962 which had larger 28.5mm inlet ports which were angled down, 40° splayed exhaust ports to improve cooling and larger fins. The 88SS was produced until October 1966.

== Model history ==
An experimental featherbed framed dominator was first seen in Holland in 1951, and the 88 was officially launched at the Earls Court Motorcycle Show later in the year.

The model sold well in 1952 but supplies of the frame, which was fabricated by Reynolds Tubing, limited production to around 20 machines a week.

The bolt-on rear part of the frame was replaced with a welded-on sub-frame and the front brake increased to 8 in (200 mm) in 1954.

Full width alloy hubs were introduced for the 1956 models along with a new Lucas headlamp with the speedo, ammeter and switch located in the headlamp shell. Compression ratio was raised to 7.8:1 from 6.8:1 to take advantage of the better fuel that was now available. An alloy head was also fitted in this year, which was 13 lb (5.9 kg) lighter than the previous cast iron item.

For the 1957 model the gearbox was changed to the AMC gearbox used on AJS and Matchless twins.

An alternator and coil ignition were fitted in place of the magneto and dynamo from 1958.

The featherbed frame was modified in 1960 by moving the top tubes closer together. The updated frame came to be known as the 'slimline' and the previous version as the 'wideline'. Compression ratio was increased to 8.1:1, gear ratios changed and bonded clutch plates fitted.

A new head was introduced in 1961 on the 88SS model with larger finning and inlet valve increased from 1.3 in (33 mm) to 1.4 in (36 mm). This head was also fitted to the Standard 88 from 1962.

In 1962 the 88SS was fitted with the cylinder head used on the 650SS which had larger 28.5mm inlet ports which were angled down, 40° splayed exhaust ports to improve cooling and larger fins.

== Racing ==
The Norton racing team starting developing the 88 for racing, the machines being known as Domiracers. Initially they were no match for the Manx Norton. Under Doug Hele's guidance the machine was developed to increase power to 55 bhp (41 kW) and the machines were 35 lb (16 kg) lighter than the Manx.

The first outing for the racing 88s was at the 1953 Daytona 200 where a pair of machines were entered and Milt Lassiter finished third.

In 1960 Dennis Greenfield and Fred Swift won the 500 cc class of the Thruxton 500 on a Domiracer. Tom Phillis came third in the 1961 Isle of Man TT Senior race and was the first rider to achieve a 100 mph lap on a pushrod bike and also it was the first 100 mph lap on a twin.

An 88SS won the 1962 1,000 km production race at Silverstone.

The factory stopped the Domiracer project in 1962 and the bikes and spares were sold to Paul Dunstall who continued their development.
