= Norton Manxman =

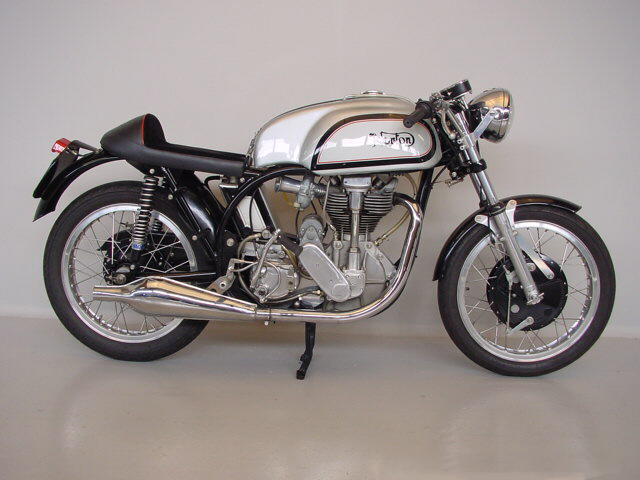
- Manufacturer: Norton
- Production: 1960–1961
- Assembly: Bracebridge St, Birmingham
- Successor: Norton 650SS
- Engine: 646 cc (39.4 cu in) air-cooled OHV vertical twin
- Bore / stroke: 68 mm × 89 mm (2.7 in × 3.5 in)
- Compression ratio: 8.3:1
- Power: 52 bhp (39 kW)
- Ignition type: Magneto
- Transmission: Wet clutch, 4-speed, chain drive
- Frame type: Featherbed duplex cradle
- Suspension: Front: telescopic forks Rear: swinging arm
- Brakes: Front: 8 in (200 mm) drum, Rear: 7 in (180 mm) drum
- Tyres: 3.25x19 front, 4.00x18 rear
- Fuel capacity: 2.5 US gal (9.5 L; 2.1 imp gal)

The Norton Manxman was a 650 cc vertical twin motorcycle manufactured by the British Norton Motorcycle Company at their Bracebridge St, Birmingham factory for export. The engine was an enlargement of the 600 cc engine used in the Model 99 Dominator. The Manxman was first shown at the November 1960 Earls Court Motorcycle Show and listed by the American importer, Berliner, in their catalogue from 1961 to October 1962 Berliner had asked for the model to be named Manxman although the twin had never been raced at the Isle of Man.

630 machines were produced in the first half of 1961 in 3 batches: first, 330 on 13 January, then 150 on 3 March and lastly 150 on 8 June. Of these, 99 were sent to Australia, 25 to Sweden, 1 to the Falkland Islands and the rest to the US.

A European-styled version of the Manxman was shown in early 1962 at the Amsterdam International Auto Show and went on sale in April that year as the 650SS.

== Technical details ==
=== Engine and transmission ===
The Manxman's engine had its roots in the 1948 Bert Hopwood 500 cc design first used in the Model 7 Dominator. The air-cooled OHV vertical twin had been enlarged to 600 cc in September 1955 to satisfy the demands of the American market for larger engines. Norton's competitors were offering 650 cc machines so the engine was again enlarged.to 89mm. New crankcases were required for the longer stroke along with a new crankshaft that had larger crankpins and a wider flywheel, all new cylinder barrels and pistons with short skirts and new downdraft cylinder head for twin carbuerettors. (Anna J Dixon)

A new alloy cylinder head was fitted that was derived from the 500 Domiracer that Tom Phillis had ridden to 3rd place in the 1961 Isle of Man TT Senior race, and achieved the first 100 mph (160 km/h) lap of the island on a pushrod machine. The head had downdraft inlet ports and wide-splayed exhaust ports to help cooling airflow over the head. A pair of Amal Monobloc carburettors were fitted. The new head, twin carbs, sports camshaft and 8.9:1 Compression ratio enabled the engine to produce a claimed 52 bhp (39 kW) at 6,800 rpm.

Primary drive was by chain to a multiplate wet clutch and was enclosed in a pressed steel chaincase. The gearbox had 4 speeds.

=== Cycle parts ===
The combination of slimline featherbed frame and Roadholder forks used on the Dominators was carried forward to the Manxman. Alloy hubs containing 8 in (200 mm) front and 7 in (180 mm) rear drum brakes were fitted.

Styled for the American market, the machine had a small 2.5 US gal (9.5 L; 2.1 imp gal) petrol tank and high bars. The bike was finished in polychromatic blue with a red seat with white piping. Mudguards and the chaincase were chrome plated.
