= Tribsa =

British motorcycle

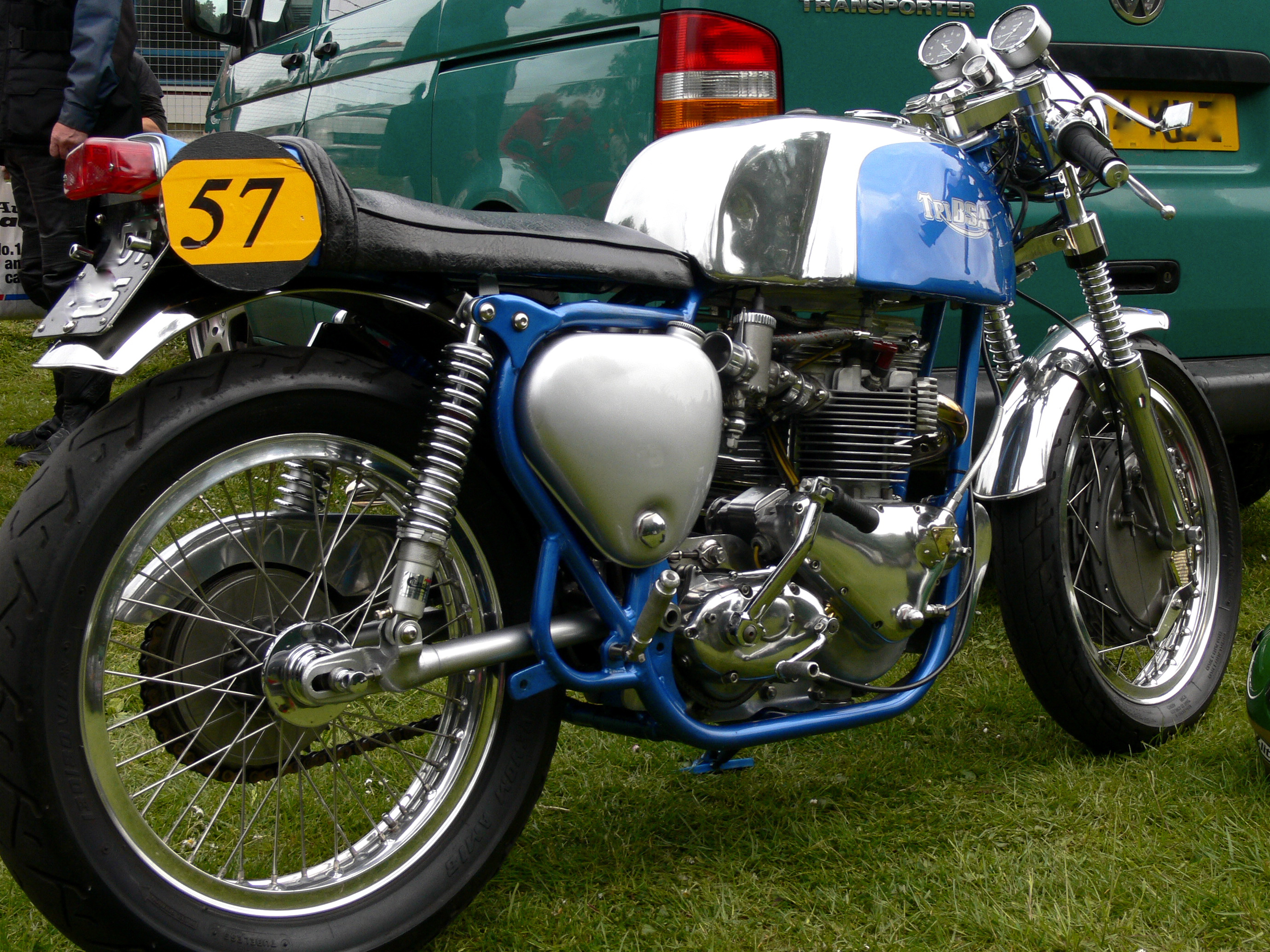
A TriBSA café-racer at the 2007 Thundersprint

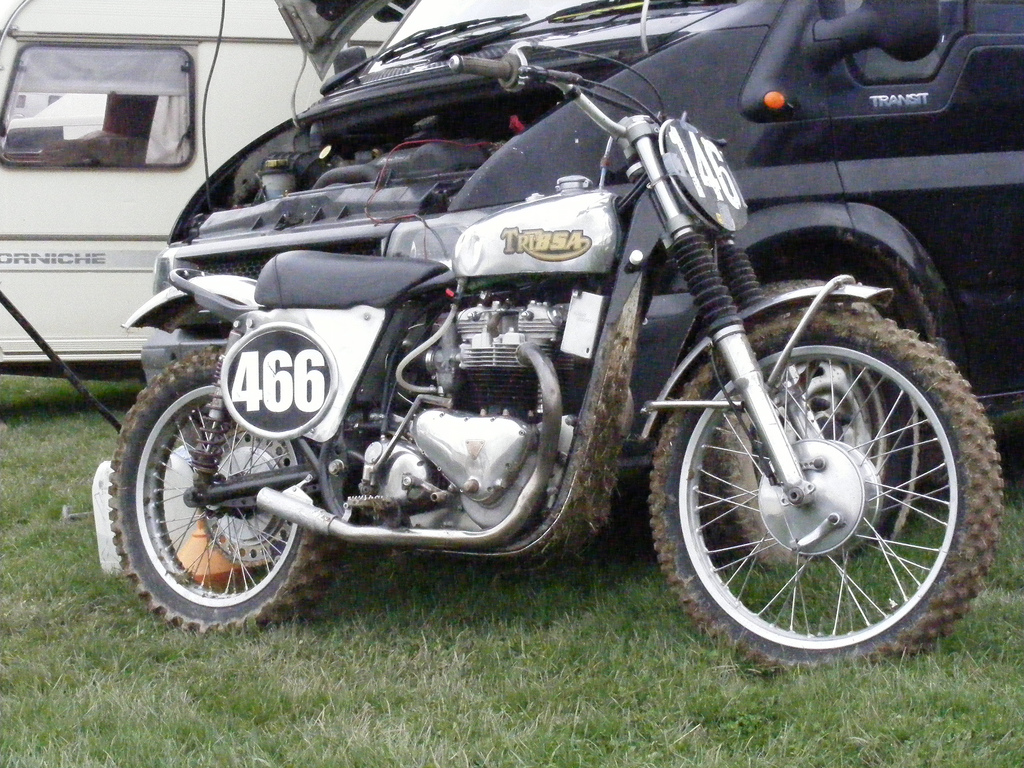
A TriBSA scrambler.

A Tribsa, was a custom built café racer or off-road motorcycle of the 1960s and 1970s. A Tribsa comprises a Triumph parallel twin engine installed in BSA motorcycle frame. The purpose was to combine the best elements of each marque to give a superior bike to either.

The Tribsa name is a portmanteau word, an amalgamation of Triumph and BSA.

Although both the BSA A65 and the Triumph 650 cc twins engines were pushrod overhead valve (OHV) units, only the Triumph had twin camshafts, which supposedly facilitated tuning for a greater power output. The BSA frame was a duplex-cradle design which was considered stiffer and stronger than the Triumph's single downtube item.

A batch of nine TriBSAs were planned by the BSA-Triumph for the 1966 ISDT using 348 cc, 490 cc and 'special capacity' 504 cc 'short' Triumph twin engines in a frame using geometry from the BSA Victor scrambler, Victor front forks and wheel together with a Triumph QD rear wheel in a Triumph swinging arm A light-alloy Gold Star type fuel tank and a steel oil tank were fitted together with three ignition coils, one as a spare. The 490 cc prototype was finished and tested in Wales with the remaining batch utilising the other engine sizes scheduled to follow. Some bikes were intended to be named Triumph and the others BSA, to enable two opportunities for makers' honours.

A Tribsa was built experimentally at Meriden by Triumph in 1973 using surplus BSA A65 frames. This led to a 'factory Tribsa' which was to use the BSA A65 frames with the 650 cc TR6 engine. Not many of these hybrids were produced and factory records are vague.

In today's vintage off-road events, Tribsas may be seen competing in motocross, enduro, and trials.

A popular alternative to the Tribsa was the Triton which combined a Triumph engine in a Norton Featherbed frame, a chassis which had yielded victories in the Isle of Man TT for Norton.
