= Norton Navigator =

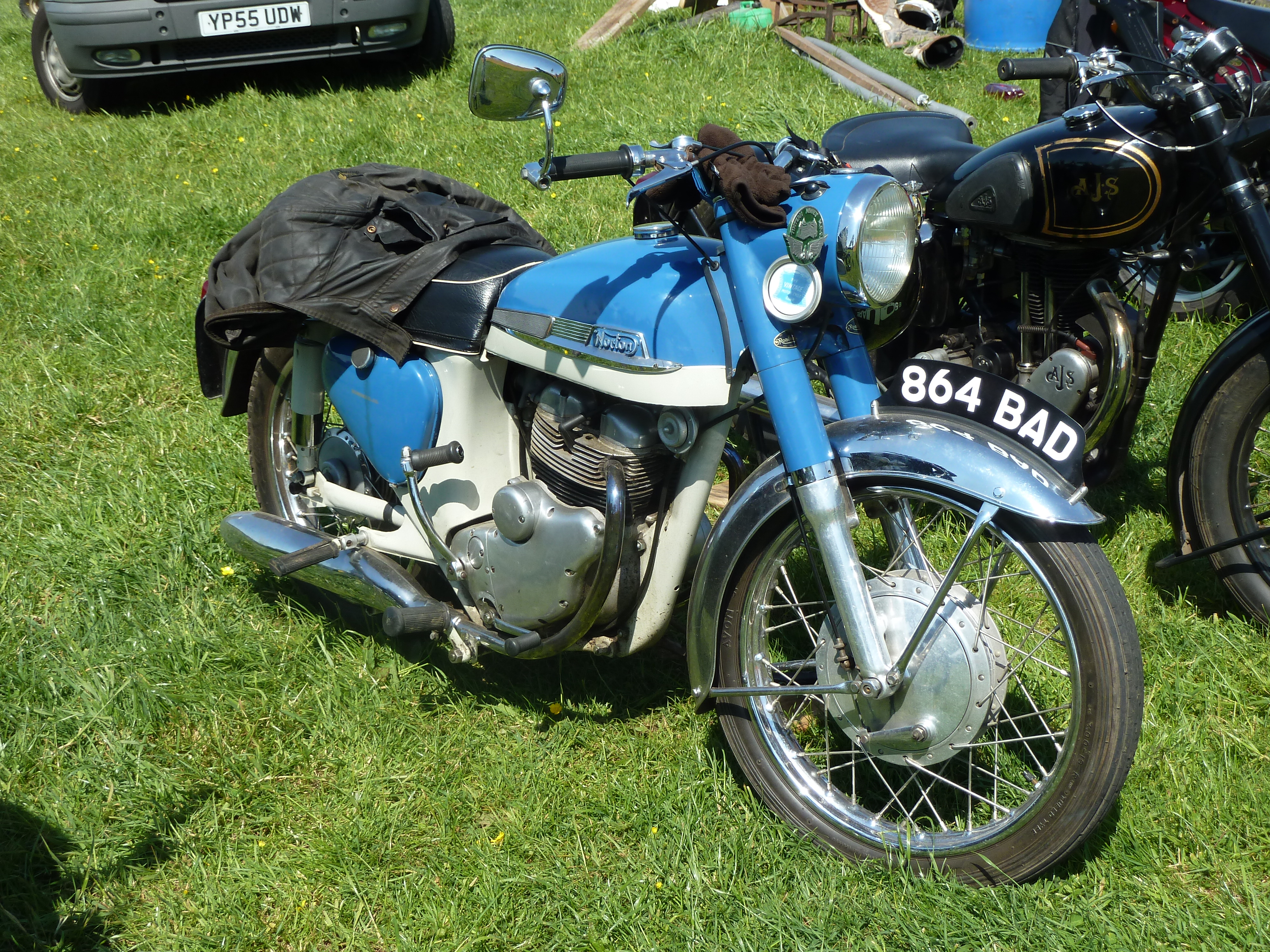
- Manufacturer: Norton Motorcycles
- Production: 1960–1965
- Predecessor: Norton Jubilee
- Engine: 349cc air cooled parallel twin
- Power: 22bhp @7,000rpm
- Transmission: four-speed, chain final drive
- Wheelbase: 51.5 inches (131 cm)
- Weight: 330 pounds (150 kg) (wet)

The Navigator is a Norton motorcycle made from 1960 to 1965, based on the Norton Jubilee 250 cc. Production ceased shortly before the collapse of the parent group Associated Motor Cycles in 1966.

== Development ==
Launched in 1960 at the Earls Court Motorcycle Show the Navigator was a development of the Norton Jubilee. The unit construction engine was enlarged in bore (from 60 to 63mm) and stroke (from 44 to 56mm), to give a capacity of 349cc. The cylinders, separate on the Jubilee, were now a single casting to improve oil retention, but the cylinder heads continued to be separate. A Norton Roadholder front fork and eight-inch diameter drum brake were fitted, to replace the Jubilee's lightweight front end. The down tube on the frame was stiffened to improve handling and deal with the power increase to 22bhp.

The top speed was recorded at over 80 miles per hour (130 km/h), and the factory persuaded Harold Daniell, the Isle of Man TT racer who named the Norton Featherbed frame, to enter a standard Norton Navigator in a race at the Silverstone Circuit where it recorded 163 kilometres per hour (101 mph) on the straight, with only minor carburettor modification.

The 1960 model was still aimed at the Jubilee market, with enclosed rear end. In 1961, optional extras included a handlebar-mounted fairing and screen, as well as large legshields and panniers, giving it the enclosed look popular at the time. Early Navigators came with two-tone paintwork in grey and black for the "De Luxe" and grey and blue for the "Standard" model. From October 1962, the Standard's colour options were changed to black and polychromatic blue, with black seats with white piping.

When Norton production moved to Plumstead in 1963, production of the De Luxe ended, but the Standard model continued with wider front forks and a steering lock, until Navigator production ended in 1965 with the collapse of Norton's parent group, Associated Motor Cycles.

== Norton Electra ==
The Norton Electra was essentially a Norton Navigator bored out to 383cc with an electric start that drove the crankshaft by a chain inside an extended crankcase. Launched in 1963, the Electra also had upgraded 12v electrics to supply power to the starter, handlebar-end direction indicators and heavyweight rear brake. The bike was instigated by the Berliner Motor Corporation and was the first Norton to be produced at the Plumstead, London Associated Motor Cycles plant. The Electra's unreliable starting, heavy fuel consumption and engine vibration resulted in poor sales. The model was dropped in 1965 after just two years of production.
