= Eoin McNamee =

Irish writer

- Born: 1961 (age 64–65); Kilkeel, Northern Ireland
- Education: Trinity College Dublin
- Occupations: Novelist, screenwriter, professor
- Writing career
- Language: English
- Genres: Crime, Thriller
- Notable works: Resurrection Man; The Blue Tango
- Notable awards: Kerry Group Irish Fiction Award
- Website: Eoin McNamee

Eoin McNamee (1961 in Kilkeel, County Down, Northern Ireland) is a writer of novels and screenplays.

== Career ==
McNamee studied Law at Trinity College Dublin and then worked in various occupations besides being a full-time writer. He has taught at the Sligo Institute of Technology and at Maynooth University. He is Director of the Trinity Oscar Wilde Centre and Director of the M.Phil. in Creative Writing at Trinity College Dublin. He lives in County Sligo.

== Works ==
McNamee has written nineteen novels and six Young Adult novels. He has also written three thrillers under the John Creed pseudonym and several screenplays.

His novels include:

- Resurrection Man (London, Picador, 1994) - detailed the bloodletting of the Ulster Volunteer Force gang, the Shankill Butchers
- The Blue Tango (London, Faber & Faber, 2001) - examined the murder of Lancelot Curran's 19-year-old daughter, Patricia Curran; nominated for Booker
- The Ultras (Faber & Faber, 2004) - about the killing of Robert Nairac
- 12:23 (Faber & Faber, 2008) - based on the final days of Diana, Princess of Wales (Faber & Faber, June 2007)
- Orchid Blue (Faber & Faber, 2010) - looked at the last hanging in Ireland, in Crumlin Road gaol, of Robert McGladdery for the murder of 19-year-old Pearl Gamble, near Newry, in 1961
- Blue Is the Night (Faber & Faber, 2014) - deals with the involvement of Lancelot Curran in a murder trial in Northern Ireland of the late 1940s. Blue Is the Night won the 2015 Kerry Group Irish Novel of the Year.
- The Vogue (2019)
- The Bureau (2025)

He has written two novellas:

- The Last of Deeds (Dublin, Raven Arts Press, 1989), which was shortlisted for the 1989 Irish Times/Aer Lingus Award for Irish Literature,
- Love in History (Harmondsworth, Penguin, 1992).

He has also written the Navigator trilogy, for children, The Navigator, City of Time and The Frost Child. McNamee commenced writing another series for children, the first book of which is The Ring of Five, and the second of which is The Unknown Spy, both of which are based on plotting and espionage.

He has also written a series under the pseudonym John Creed:

- The Sirius Crossing (Faber & Faber, 2003)
- The Day of the Dead (Faber & Faber, 2004)
- Black Cat Black Dog (Faber & Faber, 2007)

These feature the character of intelligence officer Jack Valentine.

=== Screenwriting ===
The film version of Resurrection Man, for which he wrote the script, was released in 1998. That same year, McNamee also wrote the script for I Want You, a crime film directed by Michael Winterbottom.

He has written for the television series An Bronntanas, Red Rock, Hinterland and the Netflix series Vikings: Valhalla.

== Critical reception ==
Fellow crime writer Liam McIlvanney described his writing as having the "cadenced majesty of McCarthy or DeLillo, but the vision it enacts is all his own". Mark Lawson described his work as having "a distinctive prose tone, its signature the omission, for purposes of staccato rhythm, of verbs".

== Awards ==
He was awarded the Macauley Fellowship for Irish Literature in 1990. In 2010, he won the Richard Imison Award for radio drama. In 2015, he won the Kerry Group Irish Fiction Award for Blue is the Night. In 2002, writing as John Creed he won the CWA Ian Fleming Steel Dagger award for The Sirius Crossing. The Vogue (2019) was longlisted for the Gordon Burn Prize in 2019.

He was elected a member of Aosdána - the academy of artists in Ireland.

In 2023 he was elected to the inaugural Charlotte Maxeke-Mary Robinson Chair at the University of the Western Cape in South Africa.
