= Forma Tadre =

German electronic music project, formed 1986

- Origin: Germany
- Genres: Electronic; ambient; industrial; EBM; NDW
- Years active: 1986–present
- Labels: Metropolis Records; Off-Beat; Outatune
- Spinoffs: Newt; Eisriesenkönig; Form-A-Head
- Members: Andreas Meyer

Forma Tadre is a German electronic music project performed solo by Andreas Meyer. Forma Tadre's music spans numerous styles, from darkwave / Neue Deutsche Welle to industrial / EBM to ambient.

== History ==
Forma Tadre began as a three-piece band in 1986 including Andreas Meyer. Andreas was heavily influenced by the electronic band Tangerine Dream which provided the impetus for the name Forma Tadre as a sort of portmanteau from Tangerine Dream's album Force Majeure. He has stated that Tangerine Dream's album Phaedra inspired him to start making music and buy his first synthesizer.

The band played some live shows and recorded an EP, Brightful Times, in 1987, which was produced by German producer Robert "Bobby" Giddens, who worked with many German bands including DAF. After this release, two of the members eventually split from the band without producing any more releases together, leaving Andreas as the sole member by 1994.

After the trio dissolved, Andreas was convinced by Björn Junemann - a member of Haujobb at the time - to submit demo tapes to record labels, which eventually led to the attention of Off-Beat Records, who released his next two albums.

In 1996, Andreas released his first album as the sole member of Forma Tadre, Navigator, which was a marked style departure from the previous, more traditional three-piece incarnation of the band. Navigator centered on a theme of "exploration," gluing together epic, symphonic instrumentals with numerous highly-technical EBM tracks. Andreas' interests in the occult and H. P. Lovecraft informed several of the tracks on Navigator including "Date Unknown," "Celebrate the Cult," "Gates," and "Mesozoic Tree Ferns."

After Navigator, Andreas was approached by Daniel Myer (no relation) of Haujobb to work together on a music project, which resulted in the formation of Newt. The duo - both residents of the same city - produced two albums and a single between 1997 and 1999.

Beginning around 1995, Andreas worked with a female vocalist on a project that emulated more traditional, classical music via electronic instrumentation. The project, named Eisriesenkönig, released only a single track - a remix of a Forma Tadre song - on the 1996 Off-Beat compilation The O-Files.

As Forma Tadre, Andreas produced many remixes in the 1990s and 2000s for bands such as Haujobb, La Floa Maldita, New Mind, Wumpscut, Assemblage 23, and others.

Forma Tadre's second album, Automate, was released in 1998 and once again marked a significant shift in style, this time towards a more ambient style of music.

After almost a decade, Forma Tadre returned with a 13-track album The Music of Erich Zann, inspired by H.P. Lovecraft's short story of the same name from 1921.

In 2019, a hybrid vinyl-digital reissue of Brightful Times was released, appending eight tracks recorded between 1987 and 1992 to the original four track EP.

In 2020, Forma Tadre released a pair of anthologies. Navigator Travelogue contains remixes, singles, demos and unreleased tracks from the project's most active years 1994–1997. P-SongX contains unreleased songs that Andreas recorded during the span of time between Brightful Times and Navigator along with one new track, "M15 – She a threat?".

On November 7, 2025, Andreas Meyer posted on Facebook that he had been diagnosed with autism spectrum disorder that May.

== Discography ==
- Brightful Times (Outatune, 1987, reissued 2019)
- Navigator (Off-Beat, Metropolis Records, 1997)
- Automate (Off-Beat, Metropolis, 1998)
- The Music of Erich Zann (2008)
- Navigator Travelogue (2020)
- P-SongX (2020)
- Geiger's Day (2021)
- Seven Century Factory (2025)
