= Cromie McCandless =

British motorcycle racer

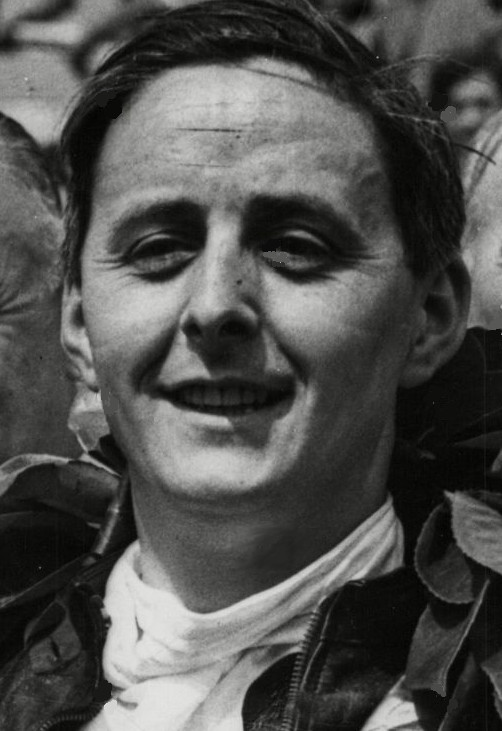
- Cromie McCandless in 1952
- Nationality: British
Motorcycle racing career statistics
Grand Prix motorcycle racing
Active years	1949 – 1952
First race	1949 500cc Ulster Grand Prix
Last race	1952 500cc Ulster Grand Prix
First win	1951 Isle of Man TT 125cc Ultra-Lightweight TT
Last win	1952 500cc Ulster Grand Prix
Starts / Wins / Podiums / Poles / F. laps / Points; 7 / 2 / 3 / N/A / N/A / 13

Cromie McCandless (17 January 1921 – 18 January 1992) was a Northern Irish Grand Prix motorcycle road racer. His best season was in 1951, when he finished in third place in the 125cc world championship behind Carlo Ubbiali and Gianni Leoni. McCandless won two Grand Prix races during his career. He was the brother of Rex McCandless who designed the successful featherbed frame used by the Norton Motorcycle Company.
