= Norton Jubilee =

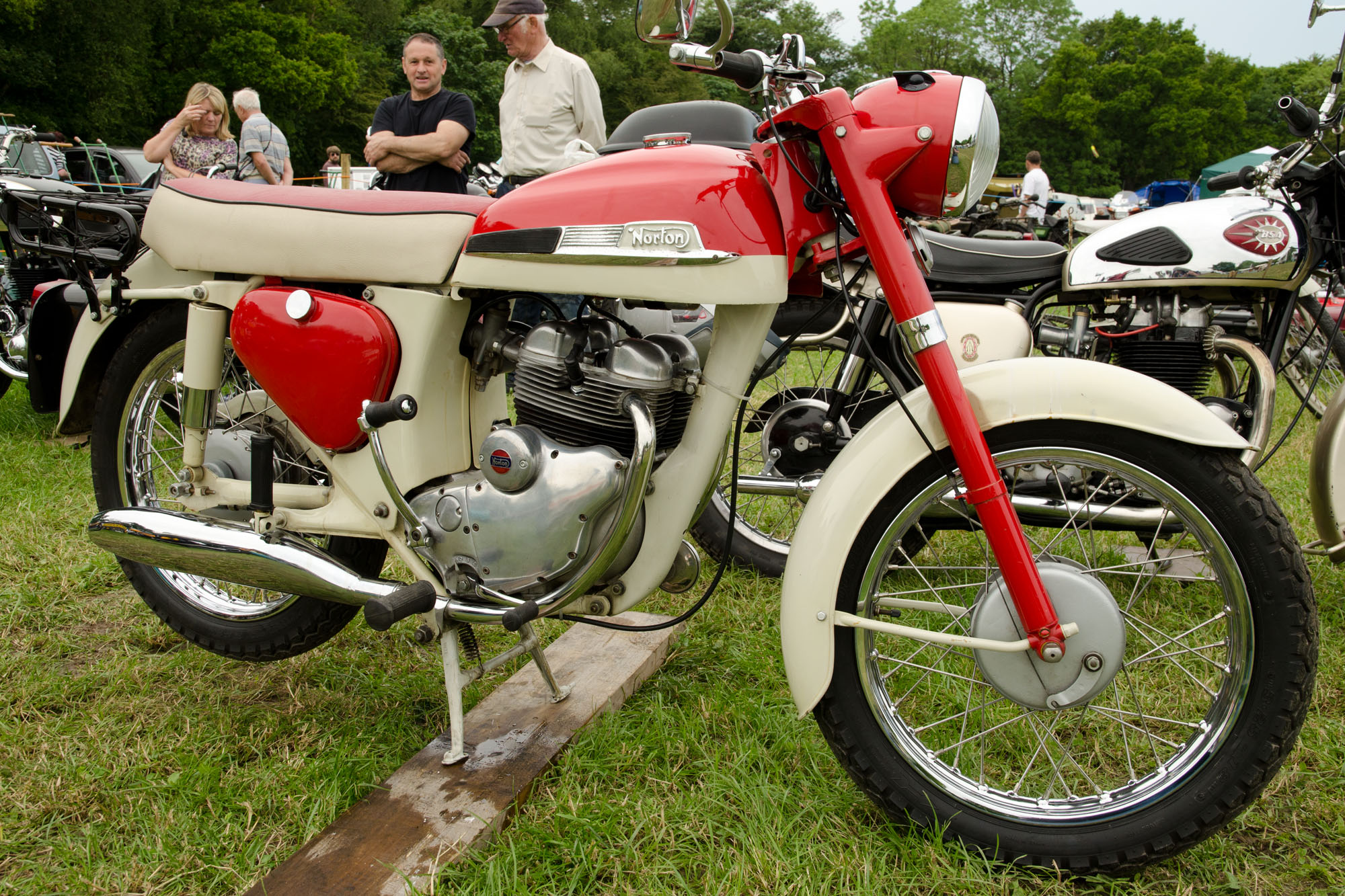
- Manufacturer: Norton Motorcycles
- Production: 1958-1966
- Engine: 249 cc (15.2 cu in) air cooled twin
- Power: 16 bhp (12 kW) @7,750rpm
- Transmission: Four-speed, chain final drive
- Wheelbase: 53.5 inches (136 cm)
- Weight: 330 pounds (150 kg) (wet)

The Jubilee is a Norton motorcycle made from 1958 to 1966. Named to commemorate Norton's Diamond Jubilee, the 249 cc Jubilee was a break with Norton tradition designed in response to UK legislation introduced in 1960 limiting learner riders to motorcycles of under 250 cc. It had the smallest engine ever made by Norton, and was the first Norton with a unit construction engine and gearbox.

== Development ==
Launched in 1958 the Norton Jubilee was named in celebration of Norton Motorcycles' Diamond Jubilee of 60 years of motorcycle manufacture. The engine was a new design by Bert Hopwood with main and big-end bearings identical to those used on Hopwood's Norton Dominator engine ten years before. Having the smallest Norton engine, the Jubilee was also the first Norton with a unit construction engine and gearbox. The engine dimensions of 60mm x 44mm gave it a short stroke and produced only 16 bhp (12 kW) at 7,750 rpm. It required high revs to reach usable speeds, and had a maximum speed of 75 mph (121 km/h).

Designed around an unusual crank in which the central flywheel had a narrow section but large diameter, the new engine gained a reputation for oil leaks and unreliability. After Hopwood changed the crankshaft material from cast to nodular iron and improved the gearbox layshaft bush, the Jubilee proved more reliable and sales slowly increased.

The new engine was in an old frame and the gearbox from older motorcycles in the AMC Group's range. The front frame tube was a steel pressing and the lightweight forks, brakes and wheels were Francis-Barnett parts. The rear enclosure came from sister company Clarendon Pressings. The gearbox was the same as in the AMC 2 stroke Piatti engine and the AJS and Matchless lightweight motorcycles.

Originally sold as a 'De Luxe' model with a fully enclosed rear end, the Standard model arrived in 1961, continuing in production until 1966. An estimated 5,000 Jubilees were built at Norton's Bracebridge Street works before production was transferred to the AMC Woolwich factory in 1963.
