= Triton motorcycle =

Hybrid motorcycle combining parts of different manufacturers

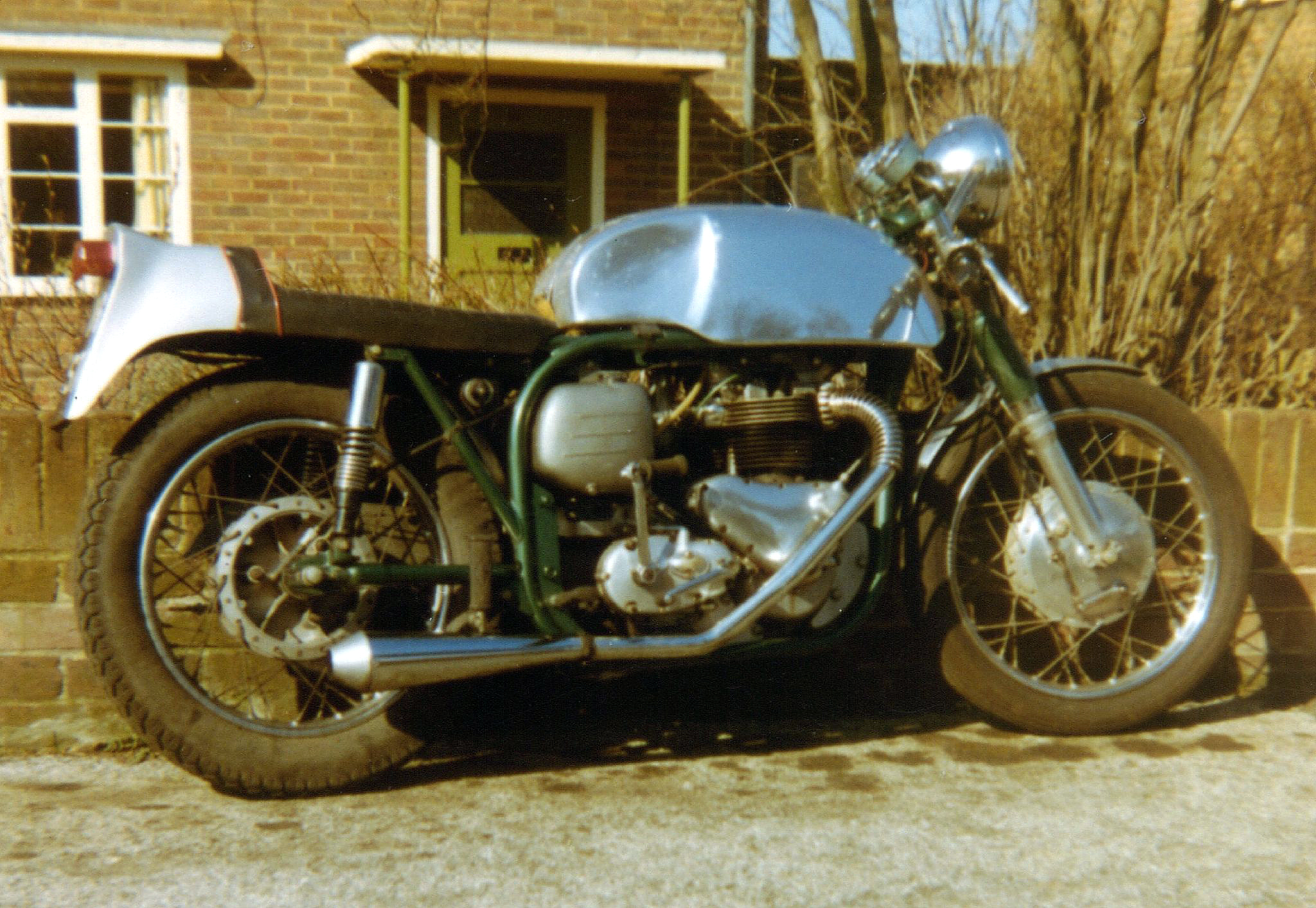
Pre-unit construction 650 cc Triumph twin-cylinder engine in a Norton 'wideline' Featherbed frame

Triton motorcycles were hybrid motor cycles built from the 1950s that involved fitting Triumph engines into Norton frames. Because no factory offered Triton motorcycles, they were typically privately built. However, some UK dealers offered complete bikes. The aim was to combine the best elements of each marque and thus gain a bike superior to either. The name 'Triton' is a contraction of Triumph and Norton; 'Triton' was the name of an ancient Greek god.

During the period in which Triton motorcycles were constructed, the Norton featherbed frame was regarded as the best handling frame. Triton bikes aimed to combine the "best engine" with the "best frame" by replacing the standard Norton engine with a Triumph parallel-twin engine. Although "best" is subjective, a popular engine choice was the Triumph Bonneville unit with twin carburettors and twin camshafts. This pushrod engine gave good performance and reliability and could be more easily tuned for greater power using high-profile camshafts, high compression pistons and twin carburettors. In due course, a Weslake 8-valve head became available for the Triumph motor.

The Triumph engine was seen as an upgrade because the Norton 650 and 750 vertical twin engines were known to have reliability problems. At about 7000 rpm the piston exceeds the engineering limit for piston speed, so over-revving soon destroys the engines. The BSA 650 had a bronze bush main bearing on the right hand side, doubling as the crank oil feed, with a lack of effective crankshaft end play control, that all had difficulty staying together when ridden hard, even though the rest of the design was possibly more robust than the Triumph. The Triumph vertical twin used a ball on the timing side, and a roller on the other, with the oil feeding through a separate bronze bush in the outer right hand engine side cover.

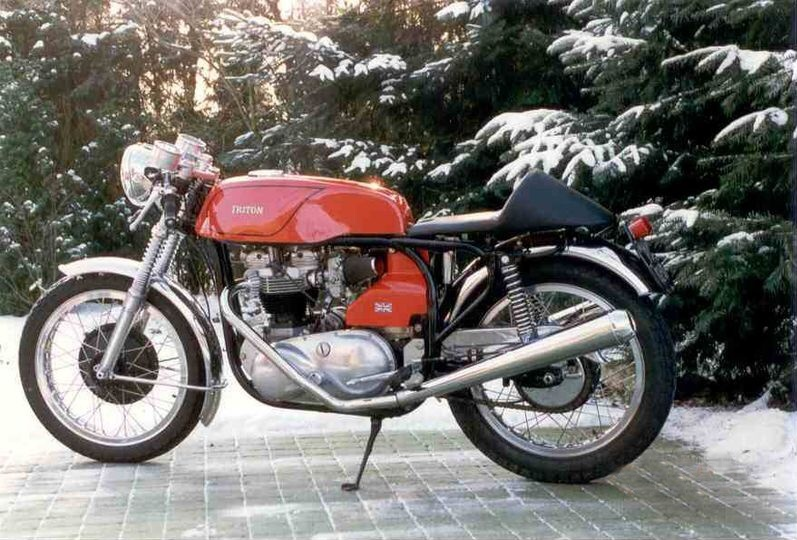
650 cc Triumph twin-cylinder engine in a Norton "slimline" featherbed frame

Whereas the Norton 650SS 646.44 cc had a bore and stroke of 68 x 89 mm giving 49 bhp (37 kW) @ 6,800 rpm, the Triumph T120 Bonneville 649.31 cc had a bore and stroke of 71 x 82 mm giving 46 bhp (34 kW) @ 6,500 rpm. However the mean piston speed of the Norton was 3,971 ft/min (almost at the, then accepted, limit of 4,000 ft/min). The Triumph, with its shorter stroke, had a mean piston speed of only 3,497 ft/min, had much less vibration and was much stronger and reliable. Road tests showed that the Norton had a higher top speed due to its 3 bhp (2.2 kW) advantage. In spite of this, the Triumph was the much preferred engine. The Norton featherbed was the preferred frame, hence the Triton.

Tritons with a pre-unit Triumph motor sometimes retained the post-1960 Norton AMC gearbox, which was thought superior to the equivalent Triumph gearbox. A Quaife five speed gearbox was sometimes used. More modern Tritons use a Triumph unit construction twin in a Featherbed frame.

Several motorcycle dealers made equipment for Triton conversions, some would do the complete job for customers while others sold complete Tritons. The most important part required are the engine mounting plates and several different designs exist that can affect the engine placement and therefore the handling. The lower the engine is mounted the better the handling achieved from the Norton frame.

== Other hybrids ==
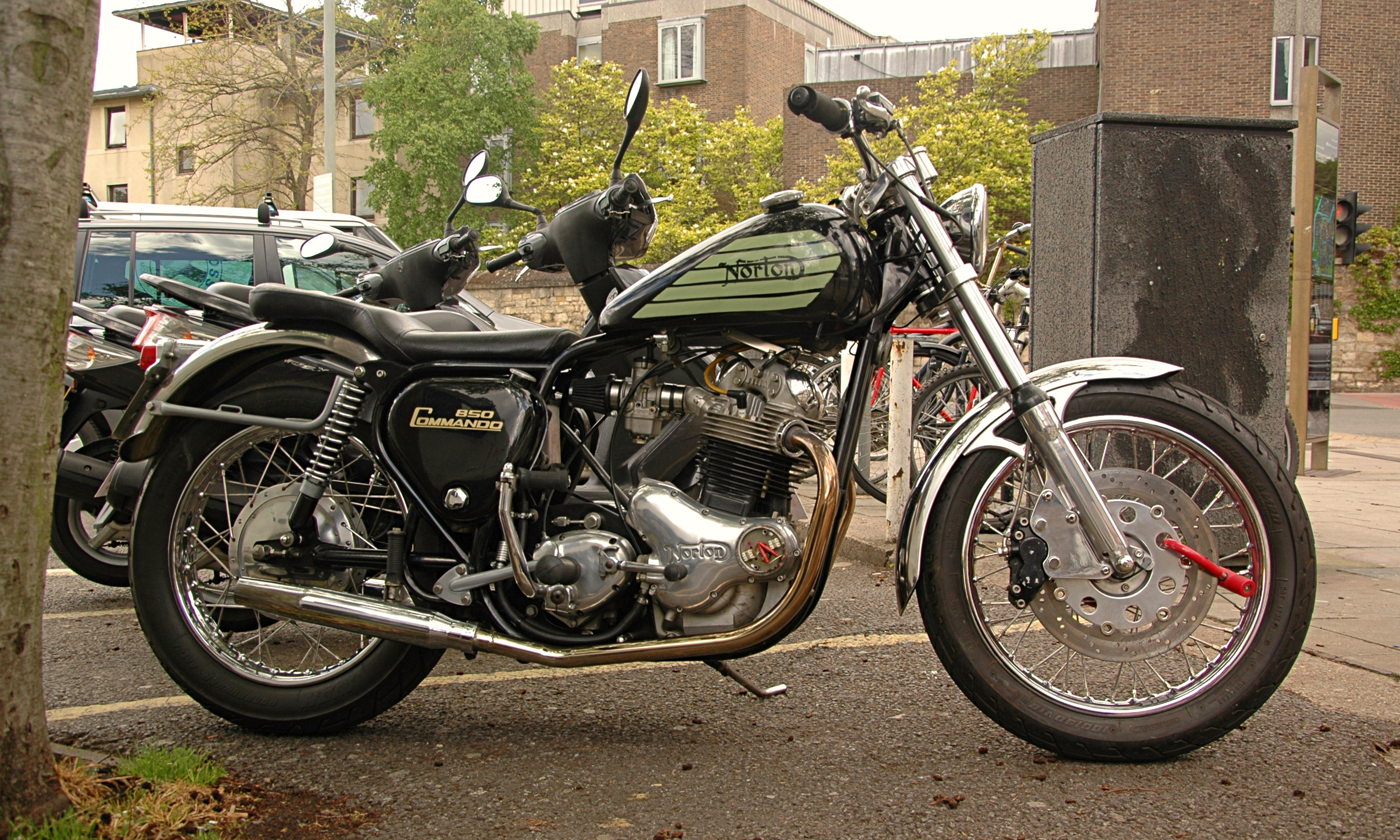
A "Norbsa" with a BSA chassis and Norton Commando 850cc engine

The Triton was probably the most common hybrid British motorcycle. Others include the Tribsa, with a Triumph engine in a BSA frame; the Norvin, with a V-twin engine from a Vincent in a Norton featherbed frame; and a Trifield, with a Triumph engine in a Royal Enfield frame. A "Norbsa" may be either a BSA engine in the Norton featherbed frame, or a Norton engine in a BSA frame.
