= Navigation (disambiguation) =

Navigation is the theory and practice of navigating, especially the charting of a course for a ship, aircraft, or spaceship.

Navigation may also refer to:

- Marine navigation
- Land navigation
- Air navigation
- Ship transport in general
- Web navigation, browsing and locating information of the World Wide Web
- Navigation system, a system, usually electronic, that aids in navigation
- Navigation, a man-made watercourse similar to a canal
- Navigation (album), the 2005 debut album by Radar
- Navigation: The OMD B-Sides, a 2001 compilation album by Orchestral Manoeuvres in the Dark
  - "Navigation", the title track of this compilation, originally the B-side of 1982 single "Maid of Orleans"
- Navigation (film), a documentary film directed by Hossein Rajabian
- Navigation (journal), published by the Institute of Navigation

== See also ==
- Navigational (album), an album by Centro-Matic
- "Navigating" (song), a 2024 song by Twenty One Pilots
- Navigator (disambiguation)
- Navigability, a body of water that is deep, wide and calm enough for a water vessel to pass safely
- Navigation research, which deals with the fundamental aspects of navigation
- Navigation authority, a company or statutory body which is concerned with the management of a navigable canal or river
- Navvy, a navigational engineer
