= Norton Mercury =

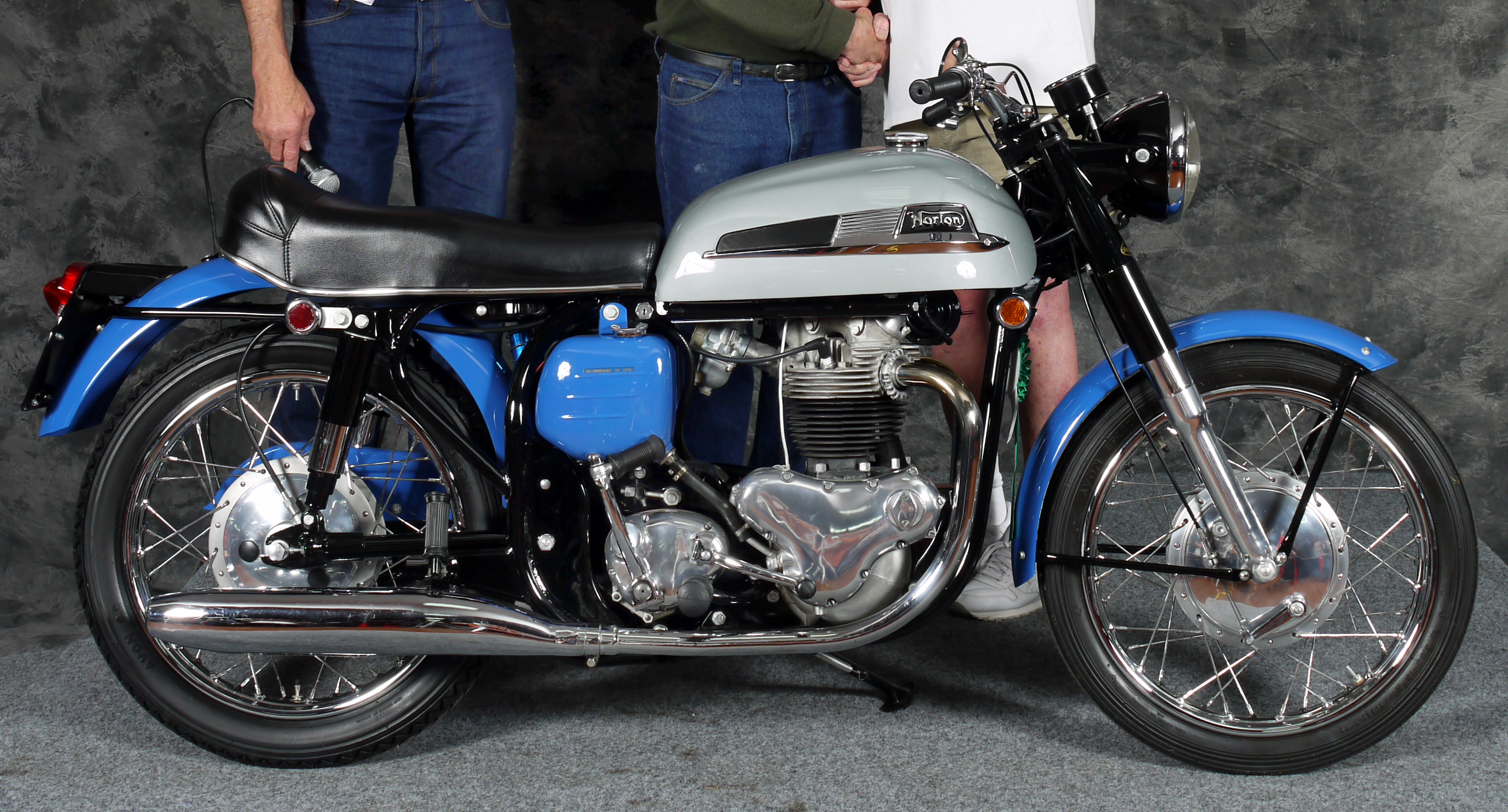
- 1969 Norton Mercury
- Manufacturer: Norton-Villiers
- Production: 1968-1970
- Assembly: Plumstead, London
- Predecessor: Norton 650SS
- Engine: 646 cc (39.4 cu in) air-cooled OHV vertical twin
- Bore / stroke: 68 mm × 89 mm (2.7 in × 3.5 in)
- Compression ratio: 9:1
- Top speed: 110 mph (180 km/h) (est)
- Power: 47 bhp (35 kW) @ 6,800 rpm
- Transmission: Wet clutch, 4-speed, chain drive
- Frame type: Featherbed duplex cradle
- Suspension: Front: telescopic forks Rear: swinging arm
- Brakes: Front: 8 in (200 mm) drum, Rear: 7 in (180 mm) drum
- Tyres: 3.00x19 front, 3.25x19 rear (UK); 3.50x19 front, 4.00x18 rear (US)
- Wheelbase: 55.5 in (1,410 mm)
- Seat height: 31 in (790 mm)
- Weight: 408 lb (185 kg) (dry)
- Fuel capacity: 3.5 US gal (13 L; 2.9 imp gal)

The Norton Mercury was a 646 cc (39.4 cu in) air-cooled OHV parallel twin motorcycle made by Norton-Villiers from 1968 to 1970. It was the last Norton model to use the 'featherbed' frame. Following the collapse of AMC and the subsequent formation of Norton Villiers, the company's focus had been on the new Norton Commando. There was a large inventory of parts from previous models that would not be used on the Commando, and to use up this stock the Mercury was conceived. The Mercury was introduced in October 1968 and around 750 machines were produced, most of the production going to the US. The model was also used by the Nigerian Police.

== Technical details ==
=== Engine and transmission ===
The engine in the Mercury was based on that of the 650SS, which itself was a development of Bert Hopwood's 1948 500 cc twin first used on the Model 7 Dominator. The pre-unit air-cooled OHV vertical twin engine used an alloy head that was fed by a single Amal Concentric carburettor. A number of internal improvements introduced for the Commando engine were used in the Mercury's engine.

Primary drive was by chain to a multiplate wet clutch and was enclosed in a pressed steel chaincase. The gearbox had 4 speeds.

The machine used 12 volt electrics and was charged by a crankshaft mounted alternator. Ignition was by coil and points.

=== Cycle parts ===
The cycle parts of the Mercury were based on the slimline featherbed frame and Roadholder forks. Unique for this model was a humped dualseat. Brakes were 8 in (200 mm) drum front and 7 in (180 mm) rear.

Most of the production was finished with Atlantic blue oil tank, mudguards and chaincases with a silver petrol tank. It was also available in black with a silver or red tank.
