= Navigator (Forma Tadre album) =

Studio album by Forma Tadre
- Released: 1997
- Genre: EBM; industrial; ambient
- Length: 51:32
- Label: Metropolis Records; Off-Beat
- Producer: Forma Tadre

Forma Tadre chronology
Navigator (1997)	Automate (1998)

Navigator is the debut album by Forma Tadre, a German musical project that can best be described as electronic body music but has also been categorized as industrial or ambient. The main theme of the album is connected to writer HP Lovecrafts books on the Cthulhu Mythos.

== Sampling ==
- The song title "FX on a Human Subject" is taken from a sample used in the song from the 1992 film The Lawnmower Man.
- "Plasmasleep" starts with a sample from Star Trek IV: The Voyage Home and contains multiple samples from Alien.
- "Looking Glass Men" contains several samples from the 1982 film Blade Runner.
- "Date Unknown" contains samples from the film Stargate.

== Track listing ==
1. "Navigator" (Part 1) – 4:51
2. "FX on a Human Subject" – 4:47
3. "Plasmasleep" – 4:04
4. "Date Unknown" – 5:21
5. "Navigator" (Part 2) – 2:20
6. "Serpent Charmer" – 5:57
7. "Looking Glass Men" – 4:54
8. "Mezoic Tree Ferns" – 6:24
9. "Gates" – 4:27
10. "Celebrate the Cult" – 5:03
11. "Navigator" (Part 3) – 3:24
