= Newbridge Navigator =

Sailboat

The Newbridge Navigator is a sailboat that became popular due to its performance, spacious interior, and affordability.

The original GRP sailing boats was built in 1980. The owners of the design later formed an owner's association for the brand, the Newbridge and Venturer Owners Association (NAVA). It ceased to exist in April 2018.

The standard rig of the Navigator was masthead sloop. However, the Mk. 111 version could optionally be junk rigged with a lug sail.

In 1987, Newbridge Boats Ltd was liquidated. The company was later re-branded as N.B. Yachts and the company moved its production facility from New Zealand Works Church Street Bridport, Dorset UK, to Chard in the county of Somerset UK.

The Navigators were followed by a similar, but larger model – the Venturer.

Production of Newbridge Navigator boats carried on for three more years before the company ceased trading in January 1990.
