= Norton Dunstall =

Type of Norton motorcycle

Norton Dunstall 750
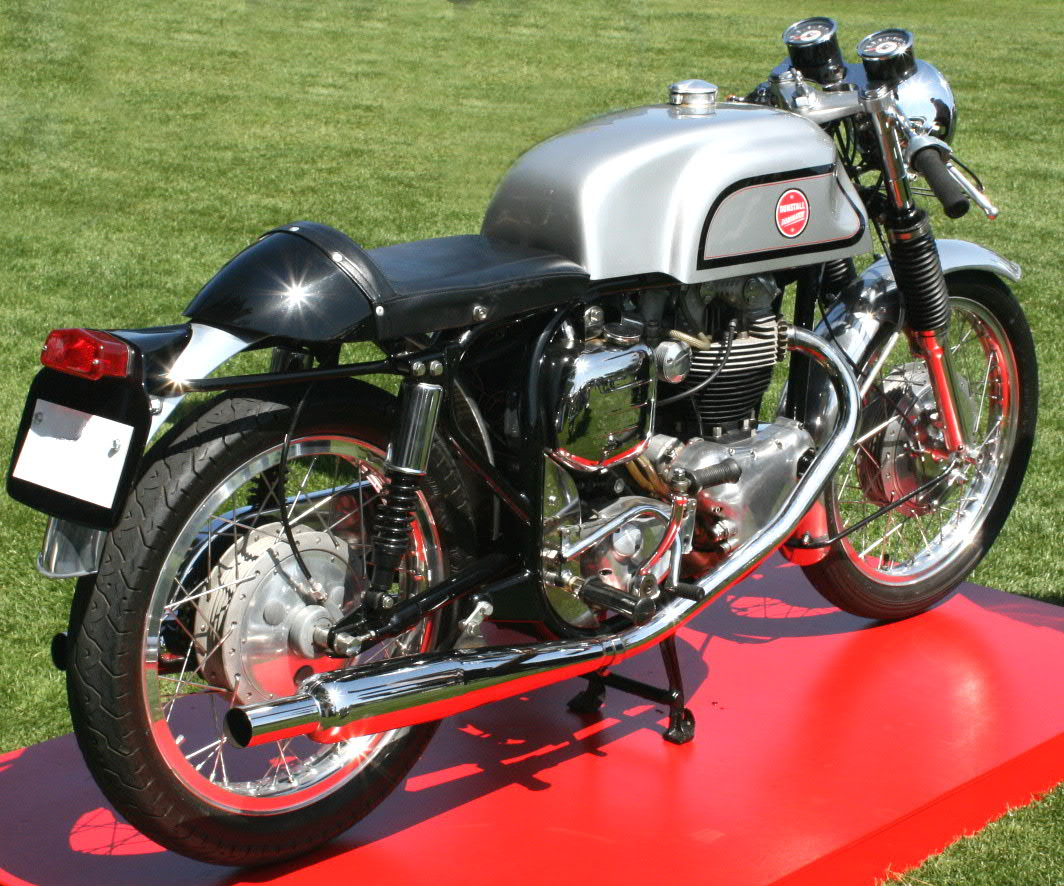
- 1965 specification Dunstall Dominator at 2010 Quail Motorsports Gathering in Carmel, California, US
- Manufacturer: Dunstall Motorcycles
- Production: 1964–1970
- Predecessor: Norton Dominator
- Successor: Dunstall Commando 750
- Engine: 745 cc (45.5 cu in) air-cooled OHV parallel twin
- Transmission: four-speed, chain final drive
- Wheelbase: 55.5 in (1,410 mm)
- Seat height: 31.5 in (800 mm)

Norton Dunstall 810
- Manufacturer: Dunstall Motorcycles
- Production: 1971
- Predecessor: Dunstall Commando 750
- Engine: 806 cc (49.2 cu in) air-cooled OHV parallel twin
- Bore / stroke: 76 mm × 89 mm (3.0 in × 3.5 in)
- Top speed: 201 km/h (125 mph)
- Power: 52 kW (70 hp) @ 7,000 rpm (claimed)
- Ignition type: Battery and coil
- Transmission: Multi-disc clutch, four-speed, chain drive
- Suspension: Front: telescopic fork Rear: Swingarm
- Brakes: Front: 2×216 mm × 38 mm (8.5 in × 1.5 in) Disc; Rear: 178 mm × 32 mm (7.0 in × 1.25 in) Drum
- Tires: Front: 3.60−19; Rear: 4.10–10
- Wheelbase: 1,410 mm (55.7 in)
- Dimensions: W: 740 mm (29 in)
- Seat height: 760 mm (30 in)
- Weight: 187 kg (412 lb) (tank 1/2 full) (wet)
- Fuel capacity: 19 L; 4.2 imp gal (5.0 US gal)

The Dunstall Norton was a Norton motorcycle made by Paul Dunstall, a specialist tuner of the 1960s and early 1970s twins originally using some parts from Norton's Domiracer project when the Birmingham factory was closed in 1963. In 1966 Dunstall Motorcycles became a motorcycle manufacturer in its own right so that Dunstalls could compete in production races, and set a number of world records before sales of the Dunstall Nortons declined in the 1970s consistent with the demise of the British motor cycle industry and a corresponding rise in Japanese imports.

Paul Dunstall had already turned his attention to modifying Japanese marques before the collapse of Norton (then part of the fated NVT) in 1974. After several more successful years, he left the bike scene to concentrate his attention on property development.

Paul Dunstall sold the name in 1982. The name is now owned by Burton Bike Bits Ltd, and trades under the name Dunstall Motorcycles.

== Development ==
Dunstall started modifying Nortons in 1957, at the age of 18, when he converted a Norton Dominator into a competitive racing motorcycle. As well as fitting a Norton Manx gearbox and wheels, Dunstall balanced the crankshaft and installed the Dominator engine into a Manx Norton frame. With places and two outright wins at Brands Hatch in his first season, after graduating to a higher level with places in his second season at other circuits, Dunstall retired from racing to work in his family's scooter shop and develop performance motorcycle parts

Initially, Dunstall conceived simple 'bolt on' modifications such as 'Goldie' pattern straight-through replacement silencers which he called 'Hi-Tune' and exhaust pipes, creating his first catalogue in 1961 and gradually growing the business.

Dunstall built engines for other racers and purchased parts leftover from Norton's Domiracer project when the factory closed in 1963, using his know-how to further develop high-performance motorcycles built to order.

From 1966, Dunstall's customers could choose from a standard catalogue offering a range of speed parts, race-styled accessories and complete ready-modified bikes from Norton, BSA, and Triumph in capacities from 500cc upwards

In 1966 Dunstall Motorcycles became a motorcycle manufacturer in its own right so that Dunstalls could compete in production races and the Auto-Cycle Union, which is the governing body for motorcycle racing in Britain, approved Dunstall Dominators as a marque for the production race in the 1967 Isle of Man TT.

The 131 mph (211 km/h) 1967 Dunstall Dominator 750 roadster was tested as the fastest motorcycle on the market at the time of its launch.

The early 1960s Norton factory racers were called Domiracer, and although Dunstall called his roadsters both Dominator and Domiracer at various stages and with varying engine capacities, the 750s were sometimes known as Dunstall Atlas. They were not known as 'Norton Dunstall' - this is a later corruption as all 1960s literature quote Dunstall Norton Dominator, Dunstall Dominator or Dunstall 750 Atlas.

The last bikes from the featherbed-based machines in the 1969 catalogue were stated as Dunstall Norton Sprint and Export 750 together with the newest bike in the range the isolastic-framed Dunstall Norton Commando.

After the 1968 race season successes, development of the late-1940s designed parallel-twin engine was nearing its zenith for the technology of the time with power outputs of 73 horsepower for the race-spec 745cc Atlas-based engine.

For the 1969 season, Dunstall created a new machine with a lower frontal area, the inclined engine being 'underslung' from a large-diameter steel tubing spine frame (nicknamed The Drainpipe) designed by Eddie Robinson. The mainframe component ran front to back with a second large-diameter vertical tube at the rear of the power plant carrying the engine oil, avoiding the need for the traditional separate oil tank. The filler was conventionally placed ahead of the seat nose

Although Dunstall's open-class racers (non-production-race category) were equipped with lowboy frames based on the design of the work which Dunstall had acquired during the Norton factory race-shop closure, this re-design was based on an established concept not yet applied to the Norton twin for road racing. With no front downtube(s) hence no conventional engine mountings, the spine frame needed substantial cantilever bracing from the central-point of the frame forwards under the gearbox and engine to control the torque reaction

The original 'drainpipe' configuration included aluminium dual 'pannier' fuel tanks inside the top-half fairing sides to lower the centre of gravity and improve handling but following fuel starvation problems a conventional fuel tank was fitted.

With the discontinuation of the featherbed Atlas in 1968, Dunstall first offered his Commando-based roadsters from the 1969 catalogue. In their test of a 1971 Norton Dunstall 810, Cycle World measured the top speed at 201 km/h (125 mph), with a 0 to 60 mph time of 4.7 seconds and a standing 0 to 1/4 mile (0.00 to 0.40 km) time of 11.9 seconds at 173.62 km/h (107.88 mph). This was the first bike ever in Cycle World's tests with quarter mile time under 12 seconds.

Sales of the Dunstall Nortons declined in the 1970s and Dunstall concentrated on Japanese marques, in particular forging strong links with Suzuki. The Dunstall Suzuki CS1000 was road tested in 1979 by Motorcycle News, with 153 miles per hour (246 km/h) being the fastest top speed they had achieved on a road-legal production motorcycle. Motorcycle News' 1980 table of top speeds listed the CS1000 as number one and Dunstall Suzuki GSX1100's 144.5 miles per hour (232.6 km/h) at two, followed by the Moto Martin CBX at three. Eventually the business name was sold in 1982.

== Racing success ==
In 1967 Rex Butcher (Dunstall's shop manager and regular rider) - supported by Motor Cycle (a UK weekly publication) journalist David Dixon on a second machine - set a number of world records on 750 cc Dunstalls at Monza in Italy, using two machines earlier ridden by Paul Smart (2nd place) and Griff Jenkins (11th place) in the 1967 TT Production race 750cc category (both recorded as 'Norton' in official race result website).

In his 13 September 1967 Motor Cycle article, Dixon reported both bikes were the same production TT race specification with lighting and (road-legal) megaphone-style silencers but had been stripped, checked and re-built, with special preparation being limited to larger six-gallon petrol tanks, modified racing seats, improved fairings from the forthcoming 1968 range and 45 psi tyre pressures. The object was to use two over-the-counter customised bikes, basically the same as could be bought.

During the 1968 British season, Motor Cycle (11 December 1968) cites Dunstall rider Ray Pickrell as securing 17 1st places This total may include the titles 'Master of Mallory' and 'King of Brands' as 'extra' races (having an aggregate result from two legs) due to Dunstall's 1969 catalogue stating 14 wins for 1968 season The 1968 catalogue shows race images of Ray Pickrell aboard lowboy race frames for open category, with production classes on Featherbed framed 750 Dunstall Domiracers.

In June 1968 Pickrell won the Isle of Man Production TT race 750 cc class entered on a 'Dunstall Norton Dominator' with a new lap record (average speed) of 99.39 mph (159.95 km/h).

In October 1969, when anticipating a future challenge at the Monza high-speed, banked-oval circuit of a record held by Moto Guzzi, to trial the machine Pickrell rode a Dunstall Norton during a regular sprint meeting to set a new national record for the 750 cc flying quarter-mile at 144.69 mph (232.86 km/h) at Elvington airfield-runway in Yorkshire.

There are no records of Dunstall's organisation competing during 1970, his regular rider (of two-and-a-half seasons) Ray Pickrell riding for Norton Villiers in 1970, then BSA Triumph in 1971 and 1972 Dunstall's shop manager and former regular rider Rex Butcher entered the 1968 TT on a Triumph
