= Rex McCandless =

Motorcycle racer from Northern Ireland

- Born: 1915; Hillsborough, County Down, Northern Ireland
- Died: 1992 (aged 76–77)
- Occupation: Motorcycle racer

Rex McCandless (1915–1992) was a former motorcycle racer, designer and constructor from Northern Ireland.

Born in Hillsborough, County Down, McCandless had been a successful motorcycle racer prior to the Second World War. During the war, he worked in the aviation industry. He had been working as a vehicle mechanic when in 1943, he went into business with his brother Cromie McCandless to repair vehicles for the Ministry of Supply. It was at this time that he built his own motorcycle which became the prototype for the successful featherbed frame adapted by the Norton Motorcycle Company.

In the following years, McCandless worked on the frame design, improving it and calling it the 'Kneeler'. This version went on to break many world speed records. In the mid-1950s he moved into four wheels and he designed two aluminum-bodied racing cars for Harry Ferguson. In the 1960s, he turned his attention to aviation and built his own autogyro.
