= The Navigator (McNamee novel) =

The Navigator is the first book in the Navigator trilogy by Eoin McNamee. It was published in 2007 by Random House. The trilogy was written for young adults and includes: The Navigator, City of Time and The Frost Child.

== Overview ==
A boy named Owen finds out that a mysterious entity, the Harsh, is making time go backward. The Harsh are mysterious vaporous, faceless beings, all in white, that can glide effortlessly across the landscape and freeze people.

Owen joins the Resisters and battles alongside the Resisters and the Raggies to defeat the Harsh, find the Great Machine in the north, and stop time from flowing backward.
