= Norton Dominator =

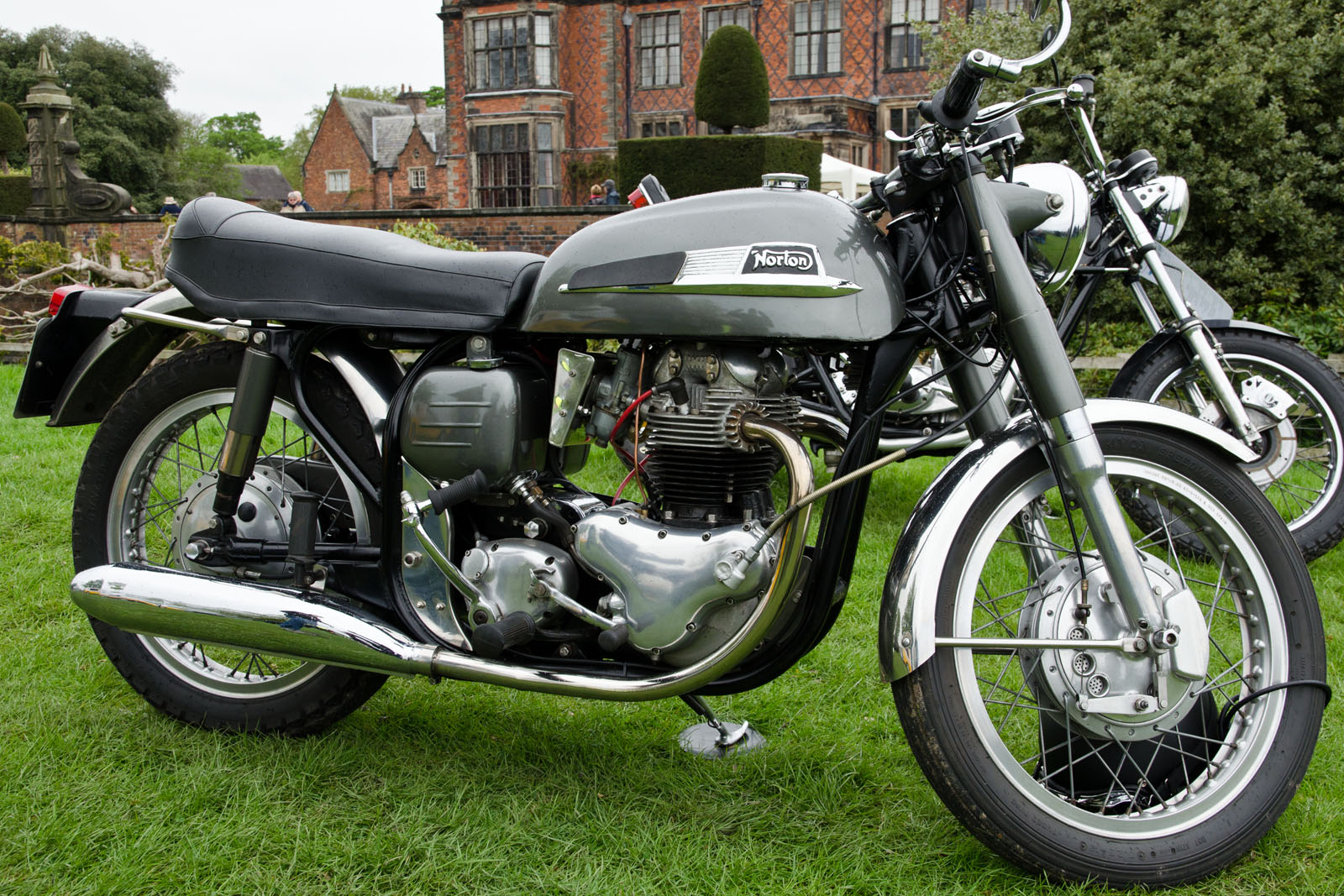
- Dominator 650SS at Vale Royal Classic Car Show in 2013
- Manufacturer: Norton Motorcycle Company
- Also called: 'Dommie'
- Production: 1949–1960s
- Engine: 497 cc (30.3 cu in) Model 7 and 88); 596 cc (36.4 cu in) (Model 99) air-cooled OHV vertical twin
- Bore / stroke: 66 mm × 72.6 mm (2.60 in × 2.86 in); 68 mm × 82 mm (2.7 in × 3.2 in)
- Transmission: Primary by single-row chain; four-speed gearbox; final by chain
- Brakes: Drum
- Wheelbase: 55.5 in (1,410 mm)
- Seat height: 31 in (787 mm)
- Weight: 395 lb (179 kg) (dry)
- Fuel capacity: 3.5 gallons (16 litres)

The Dominator is a twin cylinder motorcycle developed by Norton to compete against the Triumph Speed Twin. The original Dominator was designed in 1947 and 1948 by Bert Hopwood, who had been on the Speed Twin design team at Triumph. Available for sale from mid 1949, this design set the pattern for Norton twins for the next 30 years.

== Model 7 ==
The first Dominator, the Model 7, had a 497 cc parallel twin engine with iron cylinders and cylinder head and a Lucas K2F magneto. The crankshaft was of 360-degree layout with two main bearings. A single camshaft at the front of the engine was driven by gears and chain. The rocker box was integral with the head, so there were fewer gasket faces to leak and less valve noise. The engine was a long stroke design with 66.0 mm × 72.6 mm (2.60 in × 2.86 in) bore and stroke and mild tuning, resulting in more torque low down. For the first few years a plunger frame was used, but in 1953 the Model 7 was upgraded with a single downtube swinging arm frame, 19-inch front wheel and 'pear shaped' silencers, still known as a Model 7. The Model 7 continued in production through to 1955 and was often used with a sidecar, which could not be fitted to the later Featherbed frame Dominators.

== Model 77 ==
The first Model 77 was a rigid-framed telescopic-forked Dominator version of 500 cc produced from 1950, and supplied to the Australian market only. This used the all-iron Dominator 500 cc twin engine, with an oil pressure gauge in the ES2 style but flat-bottomed petrol tank. About 240 were made, from 1950 to 1952.

The 596 cc Model 77 Dominator was introduced in late 1956. Essentially the cycle parts of the ES2 and a 600 cc Dominator 99 engine, it was in production at the same time as the Dominator 99 as a sidecar motorcycle but was dropped from production after 1957, when sidecar Featherbeds were introduced.

== Featherbed frames ==
Duplex cradle frames known as 'featherbed' were introduced in two types; the initial design was discontinued from 1960, becoming known as wideline when followed by an updated-version introduced during the 1960 model year (known as slimline) until eventual discontinuation circa 1970 on the low-specification 650 cc Norton Mercury.

== Model 88 ==
The Featherbed frame was first designed and raced by the McCandless brothers in Ireland with the design bought by The Norton Motorcycle company who had the frames made by the Reynolds company because the Norton works did not have the necessary welding capacity for its manufacture. The Featherbed frame led to the Model 88 Dominator, also called the Dominator De Luxe, which used the same 497 cc engine and was developed in 1951. Originally developed for export it was sold on the home market from 1953. The 88 suffered from oil leaks from the primary chain case but it was the outdated and inefficient Norton works that resulted in quality control problems for the 200 Model 88's produced each week.

== Model 99 ==
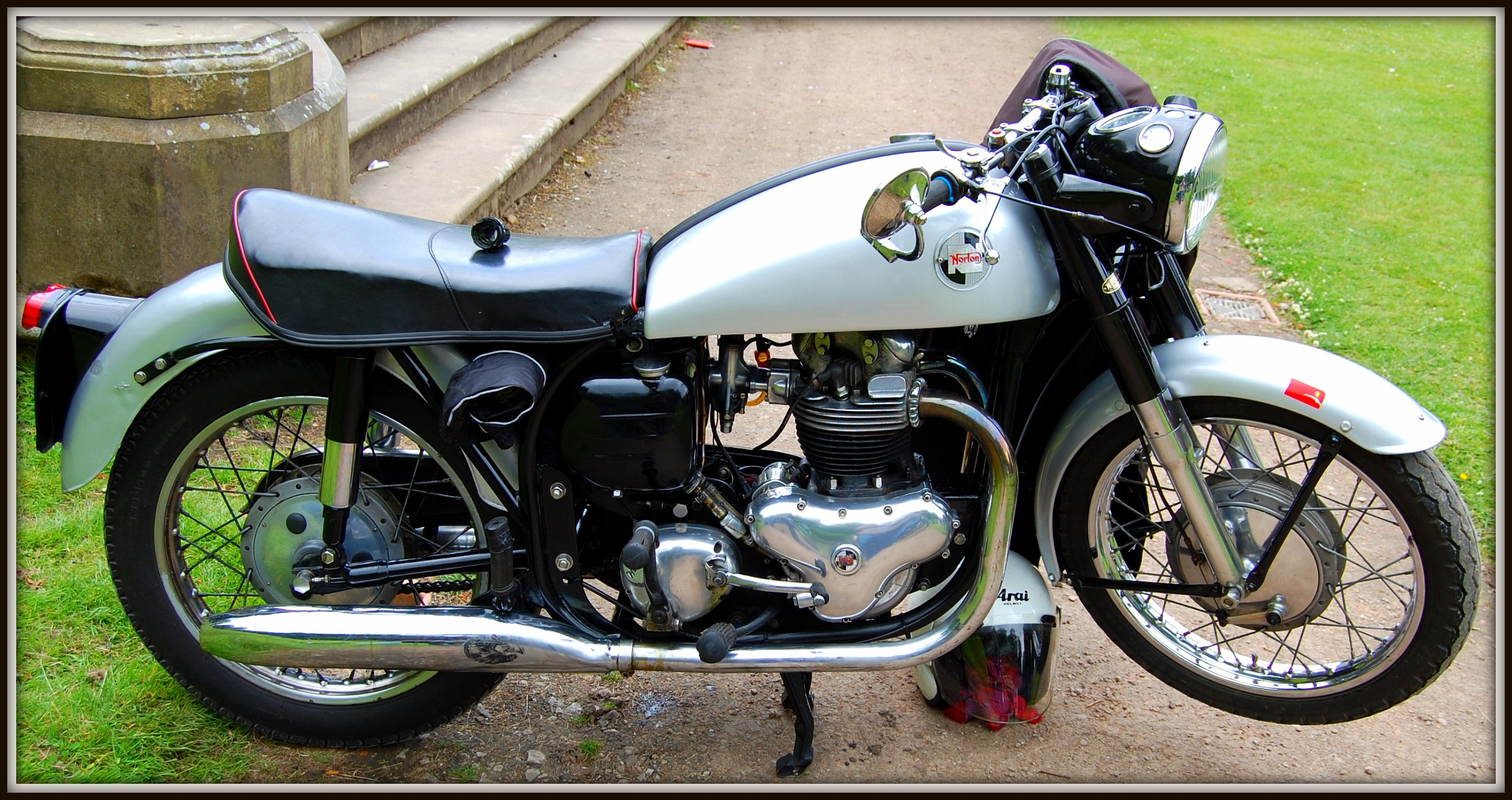
1961 Norton Domiracer Model 99

The 597cc featherbed framed Model 99 Dominator was introduced in September 1955, as a larger capacity version alongside the 500 cc Model 88 version. Due to the increased engine capacity, the 99 had a power output of 31 bhp, partly due also to a higher compression ratio possible with the alloy head introduced a year earlier. Full width alloy hubs with improved brakes had also been introduced a year earlier, preparatory for the capacity increase from 500 cc to 600 cc

== Slimline Featherbed frames from 1960 ==
From 1960 model year, the featherbed frame for all Dominators was altered so that the frame tubes in front of the seat were narrower, for improved rider comfort. The seats and tanks and indeed the whole styling of the Dominator was redesigned to suit. A large metal tank badge completed the look, along with some two-toned paint schemes. And some optional enclosed body styling on the "Deluxe" Models of the 88 and 99, along the lines of the 'bathtub' Triumph models.

== 1960 Manxman 650 and 1961 Dominator 650SS ==
A new 650 cc model was added to the lineup late in 1960. The frame was altered so that the top rails were closer together at the front of the seat area to create what became known as the 'slimline' featherbed. A 650 cc engine was installed to create the Norton Manxman. First built from 7 November 1960 to September 1961, these machines were a Limited Edition for the USA only, in custom-cruiser style - with high handlebars, all polychromatic blue paint and bright red seat with white piping round the edge. In September 1961 the 650SS was introduced. It had USA cafe bar style and twin carburettors. The SS stood for Sport Special and the 600 cc models were discontinued to concentrate on production of the 650SS, which quickly earned a reputation as the "best of the Dommies".

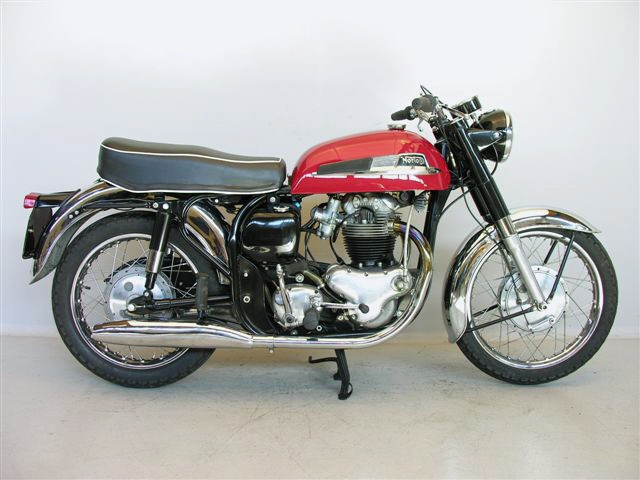
1967 Norton Atlas

== Norton Atlas 745 cc ==
A development of the Dominator with enlarged engine was available from 1962.

== Racing ==
Engineer Doug Hele had joined the Norton factory in 1956 under parent company AMC – instead of combining the two race shops, the AJS/Matchless facility was closed to Grand Prix development, and Hele was briefed to secretly develop an engine intended to ultimately compete at Daytona under AMA race regulations, requiring machines to be based on production roadster designs with a compression ratio no greater than 8.5:1, and using a kick starter mechanism.

Dennis Greenfield and Fred Swift won the 500 cc class in the Thruxton 500 event for road-legal production machines in 1960.

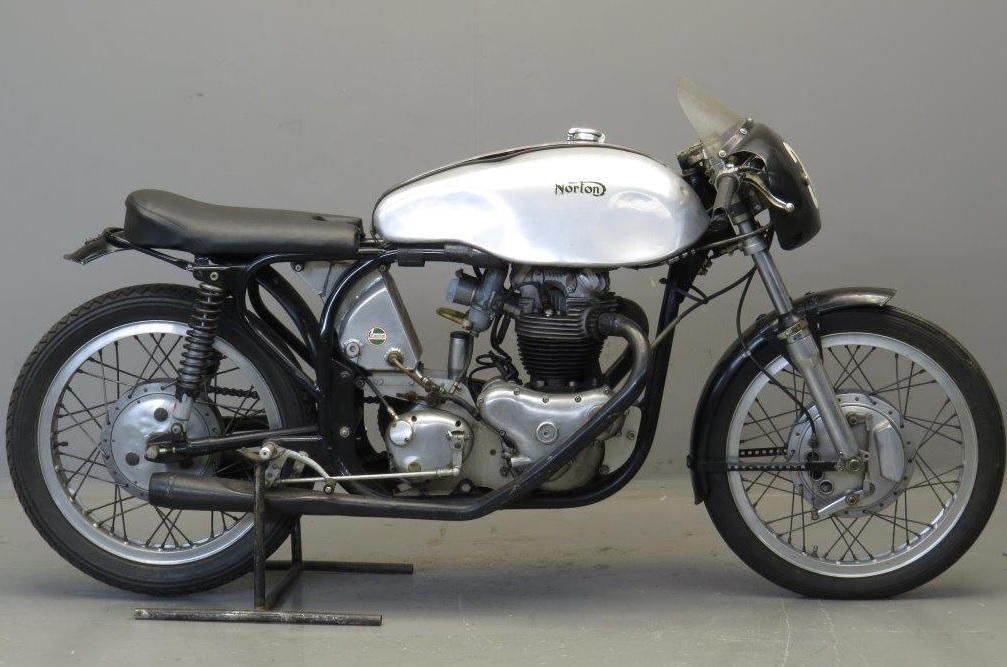
Race-styled 1961 Norton Dominator

Norton briefly used race-tuned Dominators from circa 1960, but they were still outclassed by the Manx Norton which was used for general purpose racing. The highly developed 500 cc Dominator engine intended as a successor produced 55 bhp (41 kW) and revved to 8,000 rpm. The overall weight was 35 lb (16 kg) less than the Manx, when mounted in a special lightweight-frame (dubbed lowboy), creating the factory "Domiracer".

In the 1961 Isle of Man TT Tom Phillis took the bike to third place and lapped at over 100 mph (161 km/h), a first for a pushrod engine and a first for any twin. Norton abandoned the Domiracer project a year later when the Bracebridge Street race shop closed and the Domiracer and factory spares were sold to Paul Dunstall, who continued with development and began producing Norton performance parts, eventually selling complete Dunstall Norton bikes to customers including Steve McQueen.

== See also ==
- List of motorcycles of the 1940s
- List of motorcycles of the 1950s
