= Norton 650SS =

Norton 650SS Dominator
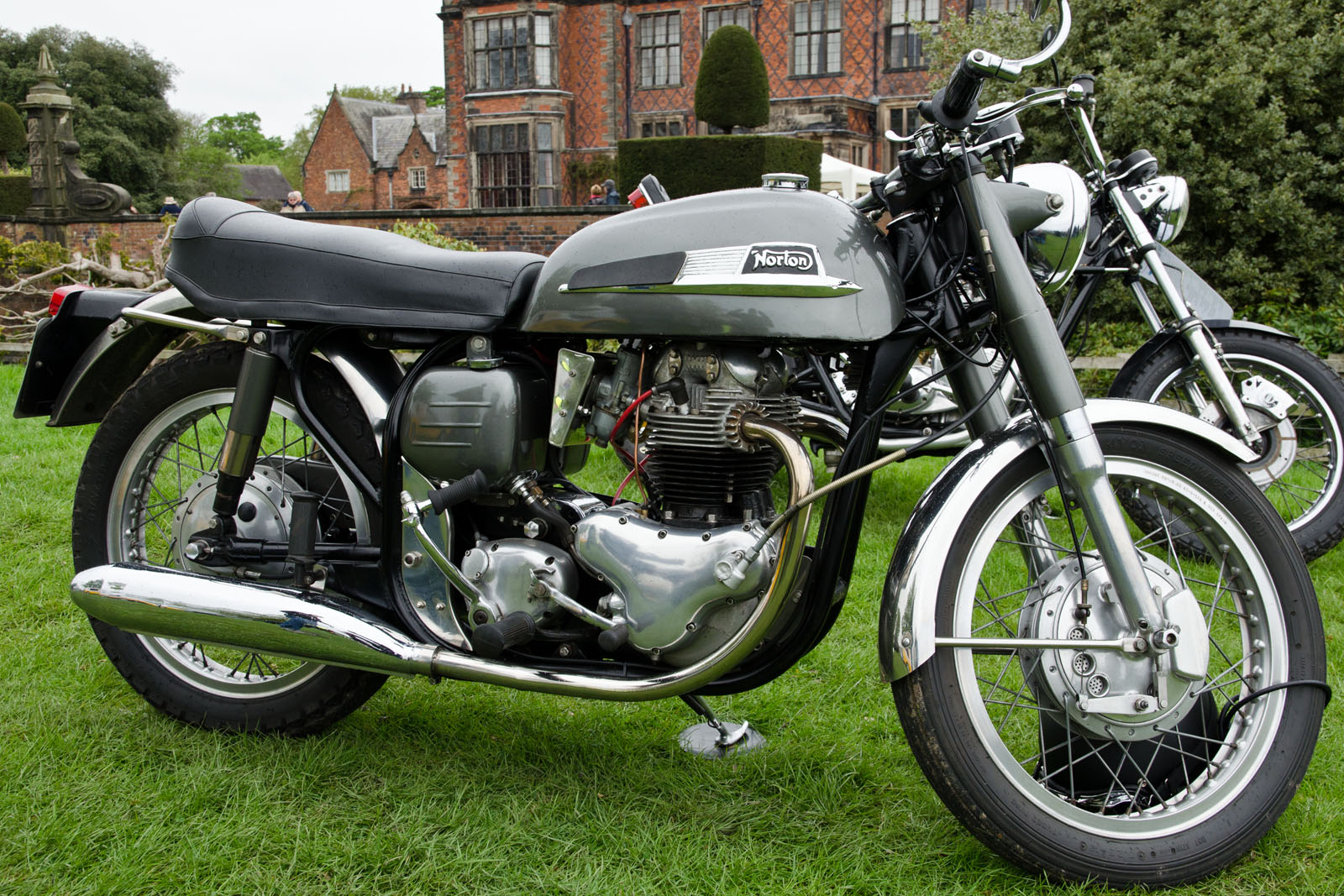
- 1968 650SS
- Manufacturer: Norton Motorcycles
- Production: 1962–1967
- Successor: Norton Mercury
- Engine: 646 cc (39.4 cu in) overhead valve, air-cooled parallel twin
- Bore / stroke: 68 mm × 89 mm (2.7 in × 3.5 in)
- Top speed: 110–115 mph (177–185 km/h)
- Power: 49hp @ 6,800rpm
- Transmission: Four-speed, chain final drive
- Brakes: Drum brakes
- Weight: 198kg (434lb) (wet)

The Norton 650SS is a 650 cc (40 cu in) vertical twin motorcycle made by Norton Motorcycle Company from 1962 to 1967. The 650SS was based on the Norton Manxman.

The machine was capable of 110–115 mph (177–185 km/h). SS stood for Sports Special. Norton discontinued its 600 cc models to concentrate on production of the 650SS, which quickly gained a reputation as the "best of the Dommies".

== Development ==
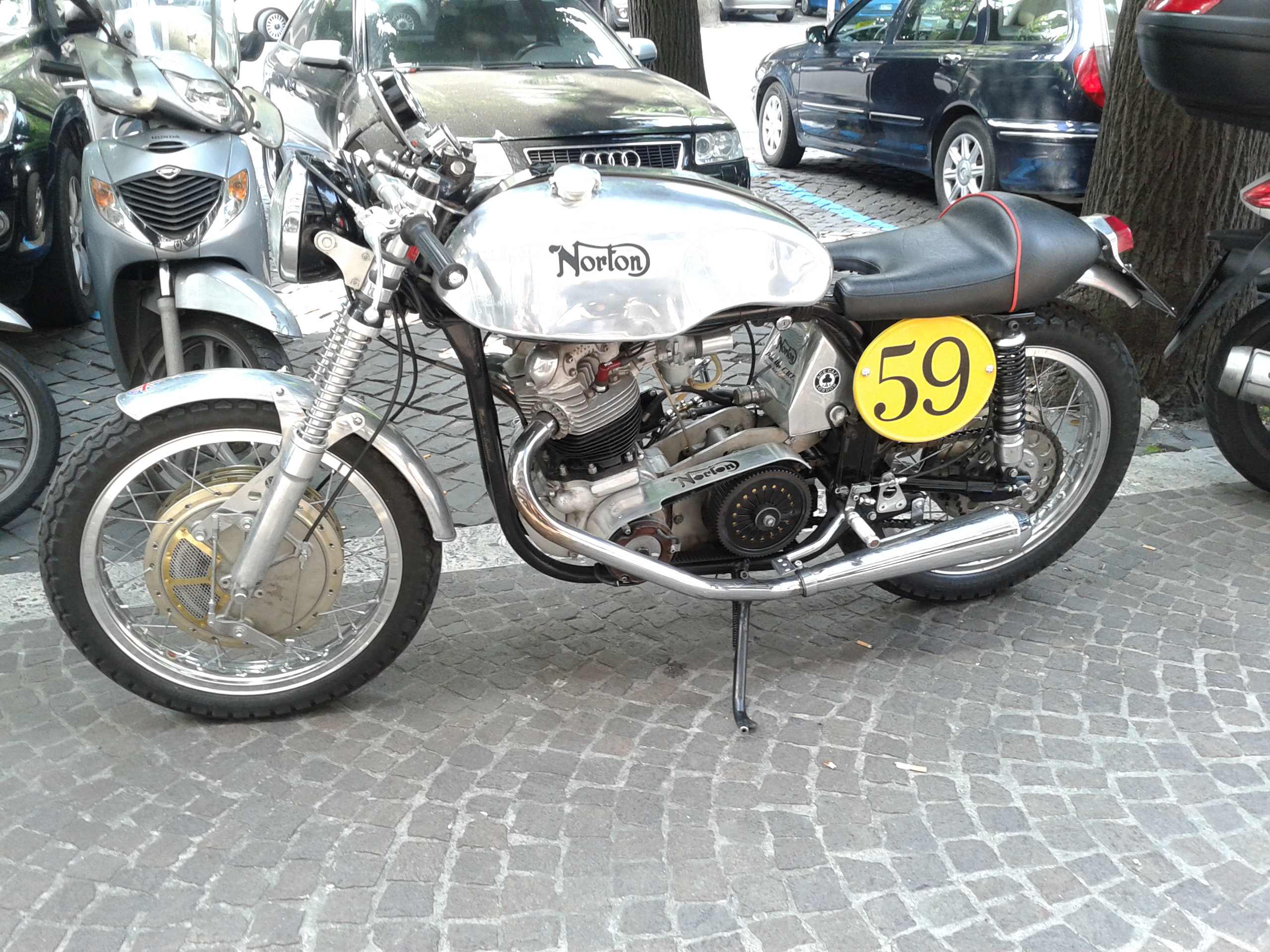
A 650SS converted into a café racer

Norton produced a 650 in 1961 for export only, which was sold in the US as the Manxman. It was finished in polychromatic blue and a bright red seat with white piping and much chrome plate, and a special exhaust system only fitted to the Manxman. The Manxman 650 twin produced 52 bhp, giving it a top speed of more than 120 mph (190 km/h). A race machine developed by Heinz Kegler had speeds of 150 mph (240 km/h) and won Pebble Beach races. Initially production was at Norton's Bracebridge Street, Birmingham factory, but following the factory's closure in 1963, production was transferred to parent company AMC's works in Plumstead, London.

A European-styled version of the Manxman was shown in early 1962 at the Amsterdam International Auto Show and went on sale in April that year as the 650SS. The machine had twin Amal Monobloc carburettors with the intakes angled downwards. Twin exhausts replaced the 99SS two-into-one and the headlight nacelle was replaced with a separately mounted speedometer and tachometer. The 650SS was finished with a black frame with silver fuel tank and optional chrome fenders.

In February 1962 Motor Cycling magazine achieved a best one-way speed of 119.5 mph (192.3 km/h) at MIRA with a 650SS. This was more than 10 mph (16 km/h) faster than the rival Triumph Bonneville tested the previous summer.
