= Featherbed frame =

Motorcycle frame

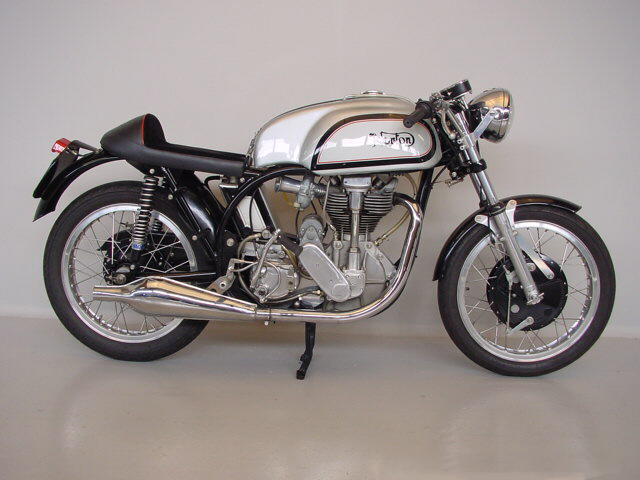
1950s-era Manx Norton styled replica built for the 1990s named Manxman, using a replica Featherbed frame constructed to special order by BSA

The featherbed frame was a motorcycle frame invented by the McCandless brothers and offered to the British Norton motorcycle company to improve the performance of their racing motorcycles in 1950. It was considered revolutionary at the time, and the best handling frame that a racer could have. Later adopted for Norton production motorcycles, it was also widely used by builders of custom hybrids such as the Triton, becoming legendary and remaining influential to this day.

The Featherbed inspired other frame builders who based their own products on similar principles, including the 1960s heavyweight Münch Mammut, a lightweight version for a 250 cc BSA C15 engine, and the 1970-conceived Dresda frame.

The Featherbed was replaced by the Norton Isolastic frame in 1967 for the then newly developed Norton Commando which used a rubber-mounted engine and gearbox, although Norton continued to offer the Mercury with a Featherbed frame until production ceased by 1970. Replicas of the frame continue to be produced by specialist companies.

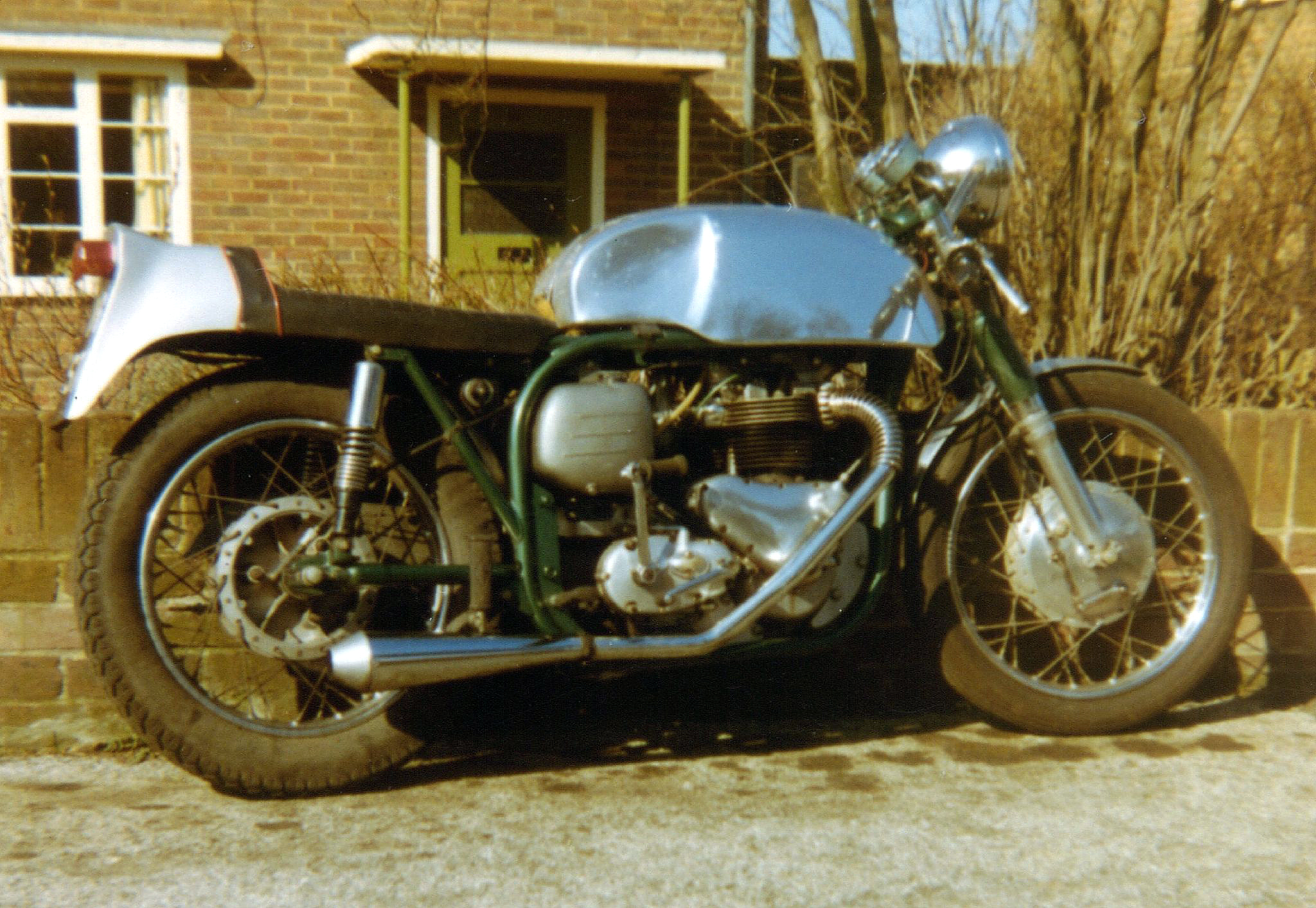
"Triton." A Triumph 650 cc pre-unit engine and gearbox in a wideline Norton Featherbed frame

== Origins ==
In 1949 brothers Rex and Cromie McCandless offered Norton a new frame to support their successful 500cc race single. Rex McCandless was a self-taught Belfast motorcycle engineer and raced competitively with his brother on a Triumph Tiger 100. He had made several improvements to the Triumph, notably an innovative new frame with a swinging arm fitted with vertical hydraulic shock absorbers from a Citroen car. BSA bought several of his converted motorcycles but Norton saw the real opportunity and contracted him to work exclusively for them from 1949. The Norton Motorcycle Company were concerned at the reliability of their plunger (or "Garden Gate") frame, as several had broken through the stress of racing. Norton engineer Joe Craig solved the problems by making the frames heavier but handling suffered as a consequence.

Norton commissioned the McCandless brothers to design a complete frame, incorporating a swinging arm. McCandless' finished design was expensive, as it required over forty feet of the best Reynolds steel tubing. It was a welded twin loop with a swinging arm fitted with their own design of shock absorbers, with a heavily braced cross-over headstock. In two months a prototype motorcycle with the new frame was on the test track and it was tested on the Isle of Man in the winter of 1949. It performed well and Norton decided that the Norton works team would have motorcycles with the new frames. The Norton works was not well equipped so the sif-bronze welding was undertaken by the McCandless brothers who produced the eight frames for the racing team by hand. Production featherbed frames were made under Ken Sprayson's direction at Reynolds, who became known as 'The Frame man'

=== The patent ===
Norton applied for a patent for the design on 13 October 1949 and it was granted as reference 664,667 but the completed specification was not published until 9 January 1952. The Featherbed frame was simply constructed:

This invention relates to a new or improved frame for a motorcycle which comprises two substantially parallel rectangular loops each formed from a single length of tubing, and the ends of the tube forming each loop cross and are welded to each other at the top front corner of the loop, the free ends of the tube which extend beyond the crossing point being welded to the side of an inclined head tube adjacent to the top and bottom thereof. The assembled frame is extremely strong for its weight and designed to provide the maximum resistance to any stresses applied to the frame by road shocks or by the driving torque of the power unit.

=== The Featherbed name ===
Harold Daniell was a successful Isle of Man TT racer with three victories and several placings in the Tourist Trophy races and the Manx Grand Prix. After testing the new Norton frame in 1950 he declared that it was like "riding on a featherbed" compared with riding the "garden gate"—and it has been called the featherbed frame ever since.

=== Racing success ===
Further testing took place at Montlhery race track with four motorcycles running flat-out for two days. The new frame stood up well to tests and saw its UK launch at Blandford Camp in Dorset in April 1950. Geoff Duke had won the Senior Clubmans TT and the Senior Manx Grand Prix in 1949 on the earlier type Nortons, so was a clear choice for Norton to really put the new Featherbed-framed race bikes to the test. Duke won the race on the new design and several racing successes followed with Norton winning first three places in the 1950 Senior and Junior TT's. In the Friday Senior TT Duke set a new lap record of 93.33 mph and also broke the overall race record, finishing in two hours, 51 minutes and 45 seconds; he had previously finished second to Artie Bell (Norton) in Monday's Junior TT. (Harold Daniell's Norton was third.) When it came to the bends on the twisting Island course the new frame gave the Nortons a distinct advantage.

Featherbed frames were also successfully modified for use in off-road racing or motorcycle scrambling. In the 1950s, Ron Hankin designed a featherbed-inspired Moto Cross frame for Les Archer junior, having curved downtubes to allow for greater front suspension movement without fouling the wheel on the frame, and with heavy bracing around the steering head tube. The frame was used with Manx Norton engines prepared by tuner Ray Petty, and also with a 500 cc Norton Dominator engine.

== Featherbed variants ==
=== Manx racer in Reynolds 531 ===
Weight and strength were key factors in the design of the featherbed frame for the Norton racing team's Manx. 16-gauge Reynolds 531, a high-tensile manganese-molybdenum steel alloy, was used as it allowed the frame tubes to be made thinner for the same strength, as well as making for a more responsive frame. All the joints were Sifbronze welded, – a relatively low-temperature flame-braze – except for the sub frame which was initially bolted-on but welded in later versions.

=== Norton International ===
In 1953 the Norton International was relaunched with a new version of the Featherbed frame made from grade A mild steel.

=== Domiracer 'Lowboy' ===
In 1956, Norton development engineer Doug Hele was tasked with creating a 500 cc overhead valve road-based racing machine to challenge the larger-displacement side valve 750 Harley Davidsons run in the same class at AMA-organised Daytona 200 races. Initially unsuccessful, the project was turned into creating a road-based race engine as a replacement for the ageing Manx Norton racer engine. Hele designed a lighter-weight, lower frame with slightly shorter wheelbase, based on Featherbed principles having slightly altered frame runs and shortened telescopic front forks which became known as Lowboy. The project was named Domiracer, and one was successfully raced to third-place by Tom Phillis in the 1961 Senior TT race. In 1962 the factory developed a Lowboy with a 350 cc Manx Norton single-cylinder engine and a 650 cc version using the Dominator 650SS engine but with a full-height Manx frame, both as tried by Derek Minter.

In 1962 the race shop closed and was sold to Paul Dunstall, who had already developed his own Norton Dominator-engined race machine campaigned by Fred Neville (deceased 1961) and Dave Downer (deceased 1963). Dunstall successfully developed 500, 650 and 750 versions, later producing a Lowboy frame kits sold to the general public. After the Dunstall organisation closed in the early 1980s, other specialists offered the Lowboy frame.

=== Single and Twin cylinder roadsters in Featherbeds ===
Having earlier installed the Dominator twin-cylinder engine of 500 cc and 600 cc, in 1959 Norton put the old single cylinder Model 50 (350 cc) and the ES2 (500 cc) into the Featherbed frame to rationalise production. Using grade A mild steel, the size of this engine determined the space between the top and bottom rails of the full duplex cradle. In 1960 the top rails were installed at the rear of the tank. Riders complained that these wideline Featherbed frames were uncomfortably wide at 11.5 inches (29 cm) but it was not until 1960 that the top runs of the frame were narrowed towards the front of the seat, with corresponding overall styling changes including tank and seat to create the slimline frame.

The slimline was used until the last of the vertical twin cylinder models in the late 1960s, the Norton Mercury, a limited-production run of single carburettor 650 cc machines based on the Dominator; the Norton Commando with its new frame design and angled-forward engine having been launched at the Earls Court show in 1967 took over as the 750 cc range-topper, later enlarged to 830 cc, but badged as '850'.

=== Dresda ===
Dave Degens created his first hybrid motorcycle of a Triumph engine/Norton rolling chassis in 1961 when working for former racer and motorcycle race shop owner Geoff Monty, using a racing Manx Norton with a blown engine. The bike was sold before it was finished, and realising there was a potential business, in 1963 Degens bought into Dresda Autos, a small scooter shop in South London together with business partner Richard 'Dickie' Boon, keeping the existing name.

Degens created what he termed as Dresda Triton from 1963, with the Motorcycle Mechanics road test of June 1964 stating "The firm has sold well over fifty to date ...", naming two mechanics/bike builders in addition to Degens, who was a regular short-circuit road racer, having ridden for Monty and Paul Dunstall on his ex-works 500 cc Norton Domiracer with lowboy frame designed by Doug Hele in the 1963 and 1964 Manx Grands Prix.

In 1970, racer and bike shop owner Dave Degens produced his first bespoke Dresda frame, after his business name Dresda Autos. Based on the geometry of the smaller-capacity (250 cc/350 cc) Aermacchis he had previously raced, the new frame had tube runs and layout based on the Featherbed, but with upscaled proportions to allow for the use of taller, heavier, more-powerful 650 cc parallel twin cylinder engines, similar to his 1965 Barcelona 24-hour endurance race-winning Dresda Triton. The new bike used Degens' later development of a unit construction race-prepared Triumph engine, unlike the earlier models having a separate engine and gearbox.

The new configuration won the 1970 Barcelona 24-hour race, reprising Degens' 1965 win. After this success, French motorcycle dealer Japauto commissioned Degens to build a bespoke race-frame for the still-new Honda CB750 four-cylinder engine that had been specially enlarged for racing to 900 cc.

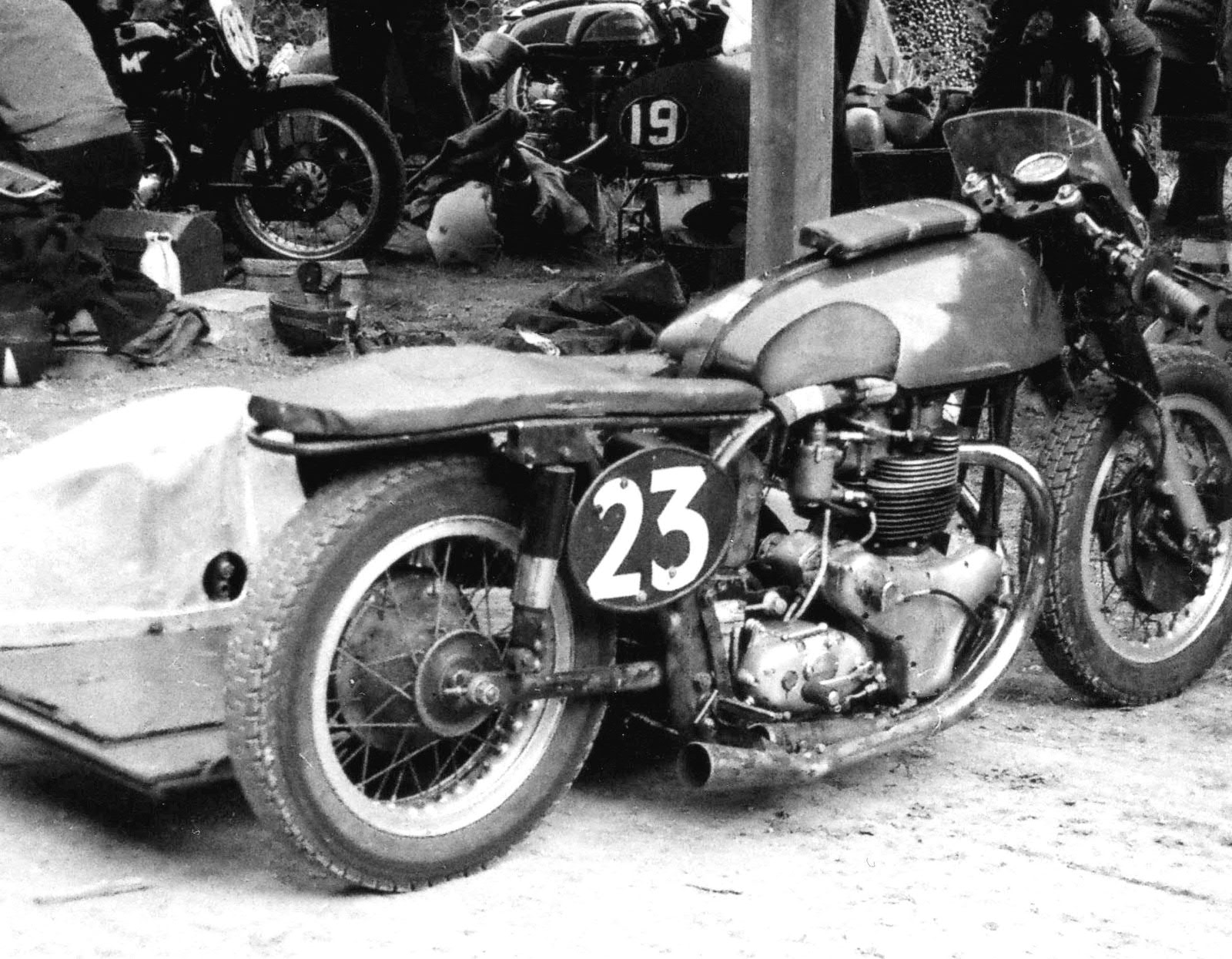
Chris Vincent's 1958 National Championship-winning NorBSA grasstrack sidecar outfit, a Manx Norton rolling chassis powered by a BSA A10 (650 cc) engine and gearbox, fitted with clip-on handlebars and rear-set foot-rests, it was also used for road racing needing only a change of tyres

This machine won the 1972 Bol d'Or 24-hour endurance race.

Degens subsequently offered frame kits for self-builders using Triumph and Honda engines, and also produced complete machines for road-use, named Dresda Triumph and Dresda Honda.

=== Special hybrids ===
In addition to the better-known Triumph-Norton and Vincent-Norton, a small number of other hybrid motorcycles, (Note: A hybrid motorcycle consists of one manufacturer's major part(s) conjoined with other manufacturers' major components, in this case a Norton Featherbed frame basis, powered by a Triumph engine (Triton) or Vincent engine (Norvin) or other more-obscure engines, including two-strokes sourced from boats or Saab cars) sometimes known as 'specials', have been created using the featherbed frame, mostly with associated Norton-sourced, matching running gear:

- Noriel – Norton featherbed frame with Ariel Square Four engine.
- NorBSA – Norton featherbed frame with BSA 500 or 650 twin cylinder engine, or Gold Star 350 or 500 single cylinder engine.
- Norley – Norton featherbed frame with Harley Davidson V-twin engine.
