= Bert Hopwood =

British motorcycle designer (1908–1996)

- Born: 1908; United Kingdom
- Died: October 17, 1996 (aged 87–88)
- Occupation: Motorcycle designer

Herbert Hopwood (1908 – 17 October 1996) was a British motorcycle designer. He designed motorcycles for Ariel, Norton, BSA and Triumph.

== Career ==
=== Motorcycle design ===
Hopwood left school early to work for Ariel under designer Val Page. Following Jack Sangster's purchase of Triumph in 1936, Hopwood moved there under Edward Turner and assisted with the design of the Triumph Speed Twin that influenced many later designs. His success led to an offer from rival Norton in April 1947, where he designed the 500cc Norton Dominator engine. This came to an acrimonious end when Technical Director Joe Craig refused to release the complete machine for production, despite Norton's financial situation. This was based on the allegation that the engine lacked power and the performance was below par. It was subsequently produced, following modifications to the cylinder head, after Hopwood had left the company.

In May 1948 he joined BSA, which purchased Triumph in 1951. In April 1955 he returned to Norton under the aegis of AMC at Woolwich. When Gilbert Smith retired in 1958, Hopwood and the financial director at Bracebridge Street, Alec Skinner, were allowed to take this part of AMC forward with much improved results. With Doug Hele as Chief Engineer, good results were achieved. However, the parent company was in a situation that absorbed the modest profits made by Norton & Francis-Barnett, the only profitable members of AMC. With the AMC implosion imminent, both Hopwood and Hele left for BSA-Triumph. Hopwood was installed as Triumph Director and General Manager.

The Norton Dominator, BSA Golden Flash and the BSA Rocket 3/Triumph Trident motorcycles were among the best known Hopwood designs.

=== Writing ===
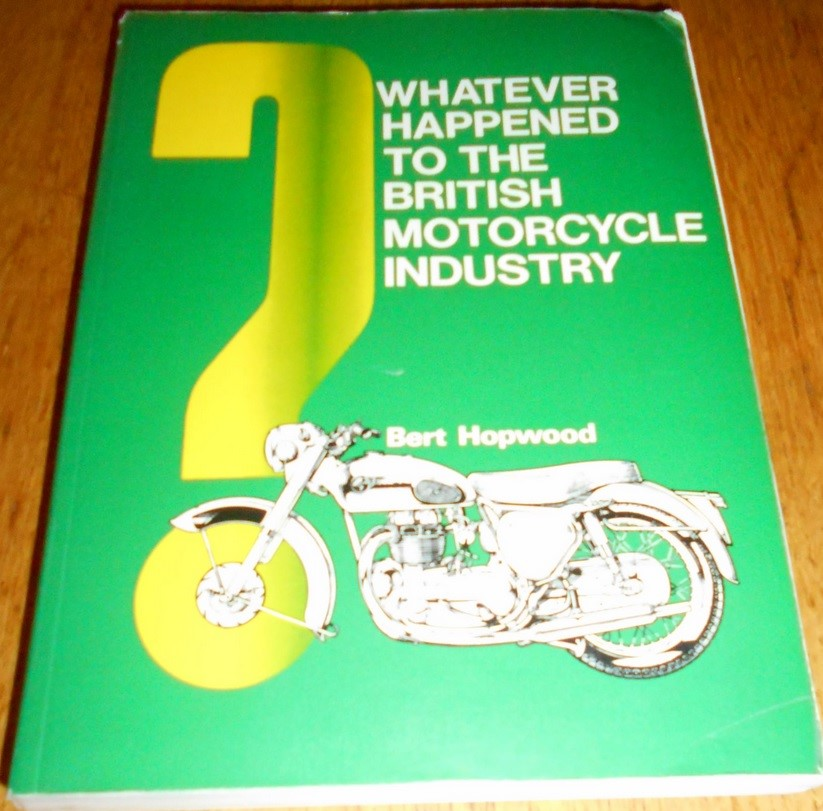

Hopwood wrote Whatever Happened to the British Motor Cycle Industry which was published in 1981 by Haynes. With hundreds of illustrations, it was intended to provide a definitive account of the demise of the British motorcycle industry but was described by reviewers as an "autobiography of Bert Hopwood, who attempts to distance himself from the events leading up to the industry's demise".
