= List of Norton motorcycles =

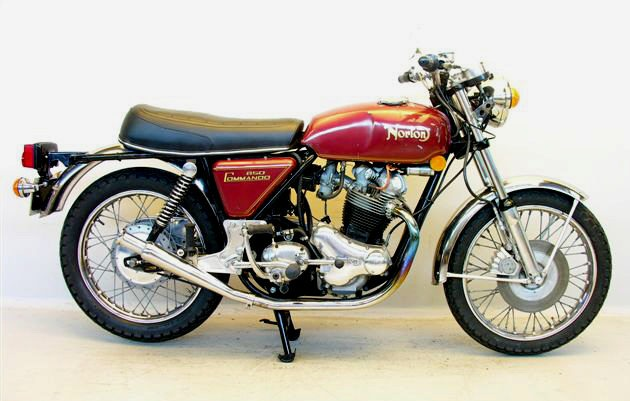
Norton 850 Commando 1973

This is a list of Norton branded motorcycles over all periods of the marque from 1908 to the present day.

== Model list ==
=== Pre-War (1908–1939) ===
Model	Engine	Years	Notes
Big Four (Model 1)	633cc single	1907–1954	A 596cc model was also made at some point
Model 7 (BS)	490cc sv	1914–1922	Brooklands Special
Model 8 (BRS)	490cc	1914–1922	Brooklands Road Special
Model 9(TT)	490cc	1912–1923	Belt-drive
Model 3½	490cc sv	1911–1918	Side-valve, became the Model 16 in 1919
Model 16	490cc sv	1919–1920	Chain drive
Norton 16H	490cc sv	1921–1954
Model 18	490cc ohv	1922–1954	Roadster
Model 19	588cc ohv	1926–1939	Increased to 596cc in 1933
CS1	490cc ohc	1928–1939	CS stands for camshaft. 1928–1930 were the Cricket Bat Motors. 1930s models were the Arthur Carroll designed motors.
ES2	490cc ohv	1928–1939
CJ	348cc ohc	1929–1939	Junior version of the CS1
JE	348cc ohv	1929–1939	Junior version of the ES2
Model 20	490cc	1930–1939	Two-port ohv version of the Model 18
Model 21	490cc	1927–1927	Semi dry sump version of the Model 18
Model 22	490cc	1930–1931	Two-port ohv version of the model ES2
Norton International Model 30	490cc ohc	1932–1939
International Model 40	348cc ohc	1932–1939
Model 50 OHV	348cc ohv	1933–1939
Model 55	348cc ohv	1933–1939	Twin port version of model 50

=== War time (1937–1945) ===
Model	Engine	Years	Notes
WD 16H	490cc sv	1936-1945
WD Big Four	633cc sv	1938-1942	Sidecar Outfit

=== Post-War (1945–1970) ===
Model	Engine	Years	Notes
16H	490cc sv	1946–1954
Model 18	490cc single	1946–1954
Model 19S	596cc single	1955–1958	Model 19R only 1955
Model 19s	600cc Single	1957
Big 4	633cc sv	1947–1954	596cc as from 1948
Model 500T	500cc	1949–1954	Could also be supplied with a 350cc engine
ES2	490cc single	1947–1964
ES2 MK 2	490cc single	1964–1966
Model 50 OHV	348cc	1955–1958	Popular single with featherbed frame from 1959 popular for Triton conversion
Model 50 OHV MK 2	348cc	1964–1966
International Model 30	490cc	1947–1958
International Model 40	348cc	1947–1958
Manx Model 30	498cc ohc	1946–1963
Manx Model 40	348cc ohc	1946–1963
Model 7	497cc twin	1949–1956	First Norton Twin Motorcycle, designed by Bert Hopwood
Model 77	497cc	1950–1952	A rigid framed version of the Model 7, supplied only to the Australian market.
Model 77	596cc	1957–1958	Built mainly for sidecar use
Dominator 88	497cc	1952–1966	Same engine as a model 7 but in a featherbed frame
Dominator 99	596cc	1956–1962
Nomad	497cc & 596cc	1958–1960	US on/off-road model
Norton Jubilee	250cc	1958–1966
Navigator	350cc	1960–1965
Electra ES400	400cc	1963–1965	Enlarged Navigator with electric start
Atlas	745cc	1962–1968	Norton Atlas Scrambler was an off-road variation
Norton Manxman	650cc	Nov 1960 – Sep 61	Export Only First 650cc machines
650 Sports Special	650cc	1961–1968	Became the Mercury in 1968 (then equipped with only one carburettor)
Mercury	650cc	1968–1970
P11A	750cc	1967–1968	Atlas engine in a scrambles frame, became the Ranger in 1968
Ranger	750cc	1968-
N15	750cc	1967–1968	The N15 was a Norton engine in a Matchless frame; the Matchless G15 was essentially the same motorcycle.

=== Superbike era (1967–1978) ===
Norton Commando models used "Isolastic" engine mounts (rubber mounted) and had 745 cc ("750") engines up to 1973 when the 828 cc ("850") engine came into use.

Model	Years	Notes
Commando Fastback	1967–1973	Just called "Norton Commando" until 1969
Commando Roadster	1970–1975	750cc 1970–73, 850cc 1973–1975. Targeted for the American market
Commando Interpol	1970–1976	Produced for police force use
Commando Hi-rider	1971–1975	Targeted for American market
Commando Production Racer	1971-	Special high-compression engine
Commando Interstate	1972–1975	750cc 1972–73, 850cc 1973–75
Commando Combat	1972	Came with "2S" cam, shaved head to increase the compression, and was made in both Roadster and Interstate form. Early on there were engine failures which quickly gave the Combat a bad name. Even though those problems were rectified, the press was so bad that the name was discontinued later in the year.
Commando "Combat"	1973	Officially, there was no 1973 Combat, but the engine was still available. This is still confusing today as some parts manufacturers list a 73 Combat, meaning the high compression engine.
Commando "John Player Special"	1974	Limited production 850 styled on the John Player racers

=== Rotary period (1981–1992) ===
Model	Years	Notes
Interpol 2		P41
Classic		P43
Commander		P52 police model, P53 civilian model
F1		P55
F1 Sport		P55B
RC588
RCW588
NRS588

=== Post Rotary period (2014-2025) ===
Model	Years	Notes
Norton Dominator
Norton Commando 961 SF MkII	2015–present
Norton Commando 961 Cafe Racer MkII
Norton Commando 961 Sport MkII
Norton SG1
Norton V4 RR
Norton V4 SS
Norton V4 Superlight SS
Norton V4SV
Norton V4 TT (SG2-SG8)
Norton

=== Resurgence (2025 onwards) ===
Model	Years	Notes
Norton Manx
Norton Manx R
Norton Atlas
Norton Atlas GT

== See also ==
- List of AMC motorcycles
- List of Ariel motorcycles
- List of BSA motorcycles
- List of Douglas motorcycles
- List of Royal Enfield motorcycles
- List of Triumph motorcycles
- List of Velocette motorcycles
- List of Vincent motorcycles

== Sources ==
- Holliday, Bob (1976). Norton Story. Cambridge: Patrick Stephens Limited. ISBN 0-85059-246-1
