= Norton 16H =

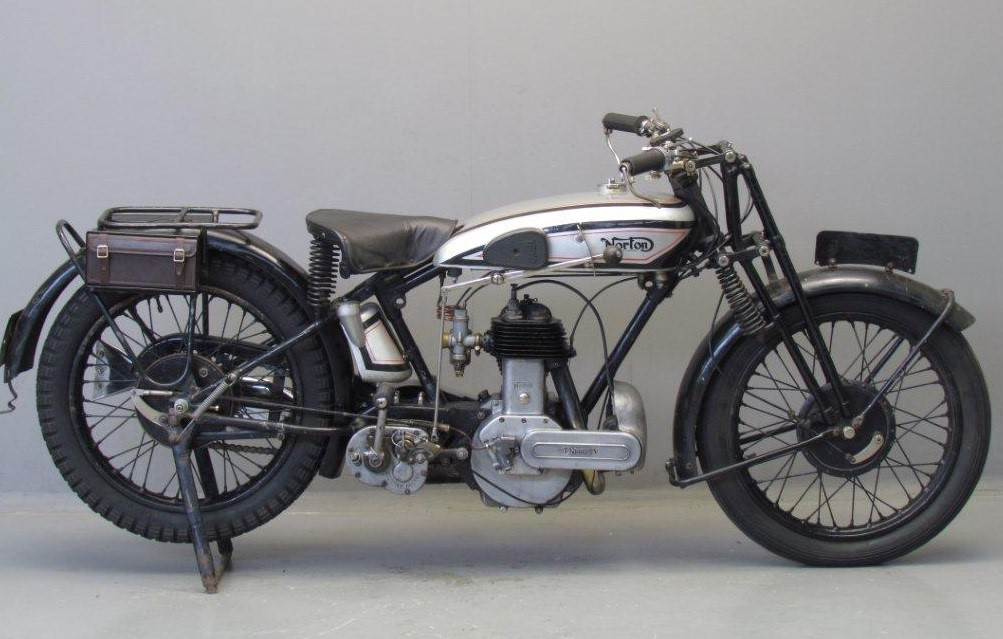
- Manufacturer: Norton Motorcycle Company
- Engine: 490cc, side valve air cooled single
- Bore / stroke: 79 mm × 100 mm (3.1 in × 3.9 in)
- Top speed: 68mph (109 km/h)
- Power: 14 bhp @ 4,500 rpm (Big4)
- Transmission: Four speed gearbox to chain final drive
- Suspension: Girder front forks, solid rear
- Brakes: drum brakes
- Weight: 388 lb (176 kg) (dry)
- Fuel capacity: 3.5 gallons (16 litres)

The Norton 16H is a designation given to British motorcycles made between 1911 through to 1954 with various modifications and refers to a single cylinder Norton 490cc side valve engine with a bore and stroke of 79 x 100 mm. The H denotes the Home model as distinct from the Colonial export model. Norton was the main military motorcycle supplier prior to WW2 and one of the main suppliers of motorcycles to the British Army in World War II with a total of nearly 100,000 produced. British Army Nortons were also supplied to the Commonwealth forces such as Australian, New Zealand, India and the Canadian Army.

== Development ==
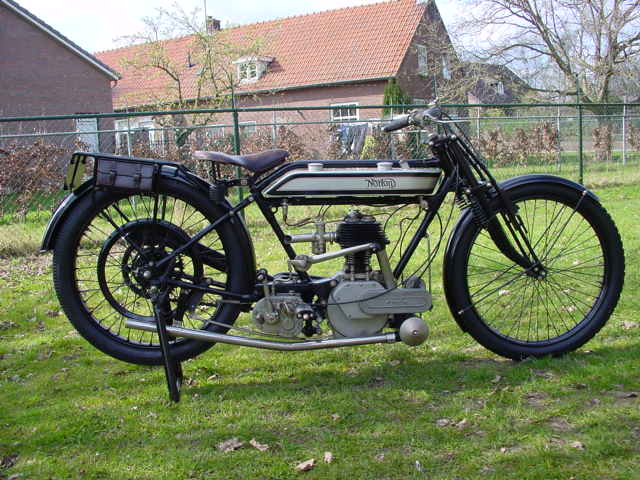
1921 Norton 16 H

In 1911 James Lansdowne Norton entered a side valve 490cc single in the new 500cc Senior Class race of the Isle of Man TT. He was unplaced but the following year the motorcycle had been improved and won the Brooklands TT, setting three world records.

A drive chain was developed to replace the belt drive and although production was delayed by the First World War the Model 16 as it became known gained a Sturmey Archer gearbox and had a racing heritage that included 21 world records.

In 1921 Norton launched the 'Colonial' which was a Model 16 with higher ground clearance for use on poor quality roads, and designated the UK model as the 16H (for 'Home'). Despite its initial racing successes, the 16H was considered the "poor mans Norton" and never gained the superlative descriptions popular for the Norton racing machines.

== WW2 WD16H ==
A 16H was first offered for military evaluation in 1932, together with a Norton Model 18 and a Norton Model 19. It was found to be suitable and the Norton designers began working with the War Office on a range of developments and modifications. Military orders were placed for the 16H (designated WD16H for War Department use) from 1936 and continued throughout the course of the Second World War, setting a ten-year record for the longest time the War Office procured a single make of motorcycle. The entire staff of the Norton factory in Bracebridge Street Birmingham were needed to meet demand - even the racing team found themselves on the WD16H production line. A popular despatch machine, the WD16H was also used for training, reconnaissance, convoy control and escort duties.

Pre war, the RAF ordered many hundreds of machines with a non-driven 'box' or Model G (person carrying) side-car. Military Motorcycles left the Norton factory in Army Service Green, Khaki green, Khaki brown or Olive green, depending on colour specified at time of production. Pre-war RAF machines (up to September 1939) were delivered in RAF Blue. Wartime RAF bikes were identically coloured as the "Army" bikes. A number of machines were painted sand 'desert camouflage' by local workshops in the Middle East and used in Palestine and the North Africa Campaign.

== Military motorcycle Production ==
Date	Production	Notes
16-09-1935	1	Evaluation machine
13-12-1935	308	Chilwell depot (50 a week)
11-03-1936	309	Chilwell depot (50 a week)
08-05-1936	219	Chilwell depot (50 a week)
04-09-1936	1	Experimental lightened machine
15-10-1936	1	Experimental lightened machine
20-10-1936	108	Chilwell depot (50 a week)
28-12-1936	2223	Chilwell depot (50 a week)
08-05-1936	219	Chilwell depot (50 a week)
01-02-1937	135	Exported to India Office
12-10-1937	1	Twin seat prototype
12-10-1937	1	Twin seat prototype
01-11-1937	7	Export to NIZAM forces
30-12-1937	200	Spares delivered to Chilwell depot
02-04-1938	500	Chilwell depot
19-07-1938	350	Chilwell depot
16-03-1939	6000	
22-03-1939	7	Ex works
20-06-1939	1601	Chilwell depot
21-11-1939	4000	Chilwell depot
01-02-1940	4000	Canadian Army export
10-04-1940	4000	Chilwell
07-06-1940	78	Stirling depot
07-06-1940	31	LP Civilian models
03-06-1940	17000	Chilwell 2000 per week
30-10-1940	1893	
15-02-1941	20	Royal Air Force
26-03-1941	5000	Chilwell
04-04-1941	74	Ex Canadian
03-07-1941	10000	Included 1000 engines and 250 gear boxes
10-11-1941	6000	Chilwell 1600 per month
18-11-1941	3	
22-12-1941	39	Royal Marines
04-02-1942	5000	
12-03-1942	35	
18-03-1942	25	
15-04-1942	50	
14-06-1942	1250	
13-04-1943	2	
10-05-1943	522	Royal Air Force Combination
08-08-1943	150	Royal Navy
26-08-1943	120	Royal Air Force Combination
06-11-1943	150	Combination
16-11-1943	125	Royal Navy
16-11-1943	5000	
27-11-1943	4600	
07-01-1944	75	Royal Navy Combination
17-04-1944	30	Combination
19-06-1944	212	Royal Air Force Combination
11-08-1944	150	
29-09-1944	2	Combination
05-10-1944	1	
02-12-1944	12	
03-05-1945	200	
03-05-1945	138	India
13-01-1945	50	Combination
18-01-1945	200	Combination
03-05-1945	36	Combination
22-11-1945	1	Passenger Side-car
22-11-1945	2	Box Side-car
20-01-1946 civilian	3840	

The exact number of bikes and the manufacturing dates for the military machines produced after beginning of 1940 are not certain. The Norton Assembly Books for the military motorcycles are missing and probably destroyed.

== Post war ==
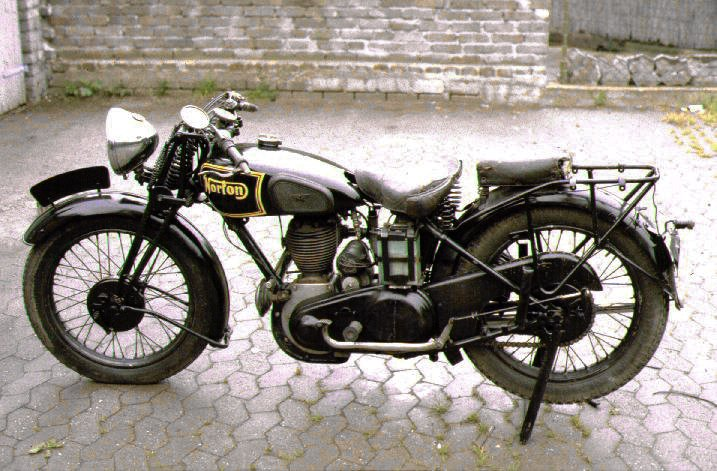
Postwar "civilianised" military Norton 16H

After the end of hostilities in 1945 there were many thousands of Norton Model 16H motorcycles all over the world. Some continued in use by the British and Commonwealth Armed forces until the end of the 1950s. Many were sold by the War Department to other armed forces, including the Dutch, Belgian, Danish, Greek and Norwegian Army which used the 16H throughout the 1950s. The remainder were sold to dealers who converted them to civilian colours and specifications. The civilian Norton had a short center stand and the usual rear wheel mounted main stand. The girder fork springs, wheel rims and the headlamp were chromed giving it a more refined look. Not many Civilian Norton 16H motorcycles with girder frames were made making them the rarest of this model.

The 16H and the Model 18 were also the first civilian models built by Norton after ending of the hostilities. In 1947 the machine received its final modification with telescopic forks, improving handling and giving the bike a more modern look, despite its age. The basic engine configuration proved popular with customers so Norton continued production until the mid-1950s when the fashion for twin cylinder motorcycles was prevalent. The 16H has a strong following of enthusiasts to this day.

== See also ==
- BSA M20 - similar size WWII military use motorcycle from BSA
- Norton Motorcycles
- Norton Big 4
- List of Norton motorcycles

== See also ==
- List of motorcycles of the 1920s
- List of motorcycles of the 1930s
- List of motorcycles of the 1940s
- List of motorcycles of the 1950s
