= Norton Nomad =

- Manufacturer: Norton
- Production: 1958-1960
- Assembly: Bracebridge Street, Birmingham
- Class: Dual sport
- Engine: 497 cc (30.3 cu in) or 596 cc (36.4 cu in) air-cooled OHV vertical twin
- Bore / stroke: 66 mm (2.6 in) x 72.6 mm (2.86 in) (500 cc); 68 mm (2.7 in) x 82 mm (3.2 in) (600 cc)
- Power: 36 bhp (27 kW) at 6,000rpm (600 cc)
- Frame type: Half-duplex cradle
- Suspension: Front: telescopic forks Rear: swinging arm
- Brakes: Drum front & rear

The Norton Nomad was a dual-sport motorcycle produced for the American market between 1958 and 1960 by the British manufacturer Norton. The machine was available with either 500 or 600 cc twin cylinder engines and was produced in small quantities, around 50 of the smaller engine and around 300 600 cc machines. The first Nomad imported to the US finished 8th in California's Big Bear Run. 822 competitors has started the race. The 600 Nomad was designated with model number N15 (1958), P15 (1959) and R15 (1960). The 500 was designated N16/P16/R16. The Nomad was the first in a line of on/off-road machines which culminated in the Ranger.

== Technical details ==
=== Engine ===
The Nomad used engines from the 88 Dominator (500 cc) and the 99 Dominator (600 cc), both of which had their origins in the Bert Hopwood's 1949 engine first used in the Model 7 Dominator. For the Nomad the engines were uprated with larger inlet valves, high compression pistons and twin Amal 276 carburettors mounted on stubs. The 600 cc engine produced 36 bhp (27 kW) at 6,000rpm.

=== Cycle parts ===
The nomad's frame was based on that used for the Model 77 Dominator but with the forged cradle under the engine replaced with tubing. Knobby tyres were fitted, and to accommodate the extra width of the tyres an oval section swinging arm was used. Front forks were hybrid items, combing parts from both the long and short versions of Norton's Roadholders. Alloy mudguards, high and wide handlebars, full-width alloy hubs, a small petrol tank and a siamesed exhaust were fitted.

The 500 Nomad has a black seat with white sides, and this was reversed on the 600 with black sides and a white top.
