= Norton motorcycles powered by Wankel engines =

Norton motorcycles powered by Wankel engines were produced from 1981 to 1992 at Norton's factory in Shenstone, Staffordshire, England. Various models were produced using a 588 cc (35.9 cu in) twin rotor Wankel engine, initially air-cooled and later water-cooled. Around 1,000 motorcycles were produced in total.

A racing version, developed by Brian Crighton, was campaigned from 1988-1992 with some success including winning the 1992 Senior TT by Steve Hislop.

The rotary engine used has its origins in BSA's research starting in 1968 with a 294 cc (17.9 cu in) single rotor engine from Fitchtel and Sachs. After improvements to increase power by a team led by David Garside, the engine was doubled up to produce the twin rotor 588cc engine in 1970.

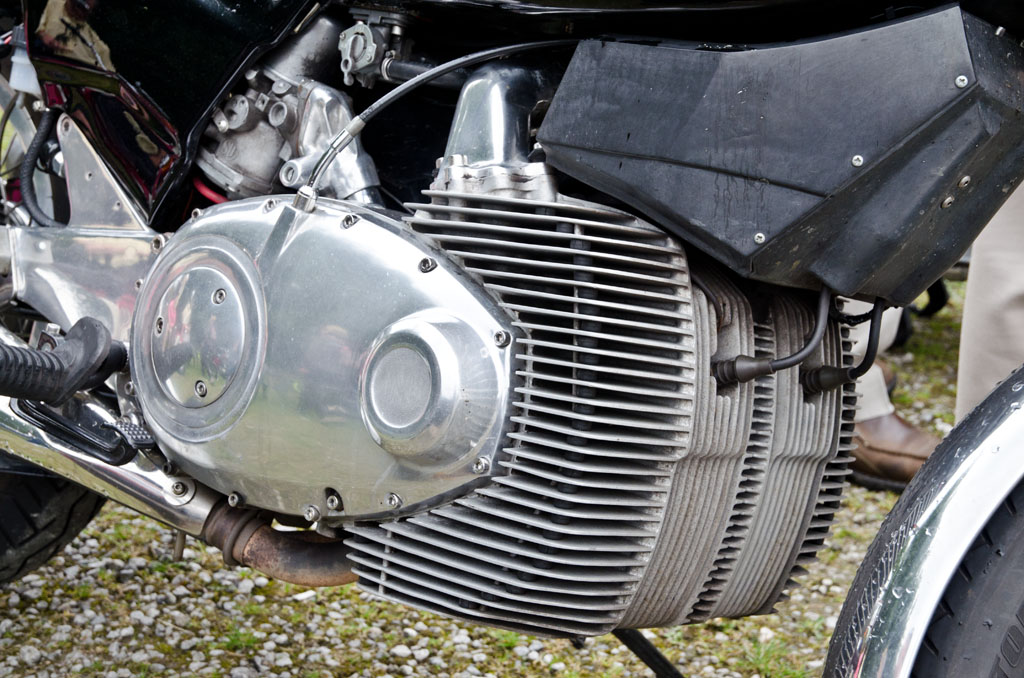
Norton air-cooled Wankel engine as fitted to the Classic

== History ==
The BSA Group first became interested in the Wankel engine in the 1960s. A rotary-engined NSU Spider was purchased by the Triumph Research and Development Department at Kitts Green for evaluation. A prototype was built in 1968 using a single rotor 294 cc (17.9 cu in) Fitchtel and Sachs KM914 industrial engine installed in a BSA C12 (Note: Some sources give this prototype as using a BSA B40 chassis.) In 1969 they recruited David Garside to lead the project. Garside had previously worked for Rolls-Royce developing a rotary engine. The Wankel project was as a significant part of the BSA Group's future and the project moved to the Group Research Centre at Umberslade Hall.

The Fitchtel and Sachs engine produced 18 bhp (13 kW) and routed the air going to the carburettor though the rotor to cool the rotor, which heated up the incoming mixture which reduced power. Garside modified the inlet and ran the hot air into a plenum chamber where it cooled before entering the carburettor. This increased power to 32 bhp (24 kW) and the engine was fitted into a BSA Starfire.

Development work began on a twin rotor engine with input from Bert Hopwood. Three 588 cc (35.9 cu in) prototype engines were built in 1970: One was fitted in a BSA A65, one sent to Triumph's Doug Hele and Fred Smith for development and one for dyno use.

In late 1972 BSA closed Umberslade Hall due to BSA's worsening financial situation. Most of the projects being carried out at the Hall were cancelled but the rotary project continued and was transferred back to Kitts Green.

Fitchtel and Sachs' Wankel licence only covered small engines so in 1972 BSA obtained a licence to produce larger engines from NSU. The licence was had an annual fee of around £100,000 which was inherited by NVT after the BSA group and Norton Villiers had merged in 1973 following the collapse of the BSA Group.

An uprated version of the engine ('type B') was produced with new casings which included the primary drive chaincase and produced 70 bhp (52 kW). The engine was fitted in a Triumph Bandit in 1973.. The following year the engine was fitted into a modified P39 Triumph Bonneville and shown to the press.

NVT were liquidated in 1978. Manganese Bronze brought the assets of NVT and formed Norton Motors (1978) Ltd to continue development of rotary motorcycles in Shenstone, Staffordshire. The engine was totally revised and the primary drive moved to the right of the engine ('type C'). Housed in a new frame it was presented to the public as the P42 Aurora in 1979.

Norton Motors was purchased from Manganese Bronze by Norton Group PLC in 1987. Head of Norton Group, Philippe LeRoux, put forward an ambitious plan for the company. The plan included the air-cooled P43 Classic, a water-cooled tourer, the P53 Commander, a water-cooled police bike, the P52 Interpol, and the F1 production racer.

Norton employee Brian Crighton began developing a racing version of the rotary. Initially this was in his own time but later a full factory team was developed. With sponsorship from JPS the team achieved success in British championships and a win in the 1992 Senior TT for Steve Hislop.

Norton Group PLC was in debt and in 1991 Philippe LeRoux resigned. The company's biggest creditor, Midland Bank appointed David Macdonald to run the company. The racing team was disbanded at the end of the 1992 when JPS withdrew sponsorship.

Crighton had left Norton in late 1990 and the following year started his own team under the Roton banner manufacturing his own bikes using the Norton engine. Initially the team raced in Australia as businessman Chris Oldfield was interested in manufacturing the bike there. The deal in Australia fell through and the team returned to England where the team enjoyed success until the rotary engine was banned after the 1994 season.

Norton had also developed the engine for use in unmanned aerial vehicles (UAV) and in 1992 Garside led a management buyout of the UAV engine side of Norton to separate it from the ailing motorcycle side and formed UAV Engines Ltd which leased part of the Shenstone site.

Production had ceased and workers laid off by the time the company was sold to Nelson Skalbania's Wildrose Ventures Inc. in 1993. A skeleton staff remained at Shenstone pending a return to production if sufficient orders were received for a road-going version of the racers, the TT558. The machine, which the design wasn't completed and would use many brought in components, received orders for 50 bikes which fell short of the 200 required to start production.

In 2003 Richard Negus and Joe Seifert brought the remnants of the Norton rotary business at Shenstone and the following year set up Norton Motors Ltd in Rugeley, Staffordshire to supply spares and servicing of the around 1,000 Norton rotaries that had been manufactured.

After Wildrose Ventures the ownership and use of the Norton trademark became fragmented. After a 4 year court battle American Kenny Dreer consolidated the Norton trademark. He had been designing the forerunner of the 961 Commando but the $4.5 million in legal fees the court case had cost meant there were no funds to put the bike into production.

Stuart Garner brought the rights to Norton in 2008. Crighton had continued to develop the rotary engine and updating it with modern technology produced the NRV588 prototype. Garner became interested in the NRV588 and agreement was made for manufacture and also manufacture of a road legal derivative. Garner also wished to enter MotoGP and a 700cc version was being developed which would be permitted under the new 2012 regulations. However Garner eventually decided to concentrate the factory's efforts on the Kenny Dreer derived 961 Commando and not the rotaries.

Crighton continued to develop the 700 and in conjunction with Gilo Industries offered a limited edition of 25 track-day bike, the Crighton CR700W, in 2021.

== Models ==
=== P39 Rotary ===
In August 1974 a 588 cc (35.9 cu in) twin rotor prototype fitted in a modified P39 Bonneville frame was shown to invited members of the press at Kitts Green. The prototype was tested by The Motor Cycle and gave a positive review. During testing The Motor Cycle recorded a mean top speed of 119 mph (192 km/h) while testing at MIRA.

=== P42 Aurora ===
In 1979 the P42 Aurora was registered. The twin rotor engine was fitted into a new frame made of box-section tubing. The frame doubled as an oil reservoir and a plenum chamber for the air intake. Drive was through a Triumph Trident 5 speed gearbox. The bike was fitted with Marzocchi forks, Radaelli wheels, Brembo triple disc brakes and Girling shock absorbers. Styling of the bike was by Bob Trigg, who had been one of the designers of the Commando.

Although the prototype received a positive review after testing by German magazine Motorrad and Cook Neilson for Cycle, it never went into production. Norton preferring to concentrate on the development of the Interpol 2.

The prototype was displayed at the National Motorcycle Museum until it was destroyed by the fire that broke out of the Museum in 2003.

=== Interpol 2 ===
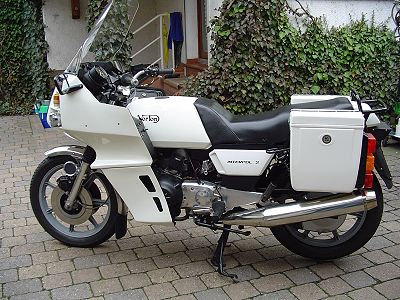
Norton Interpol 2

Norton had a history of supplying motorcycles to police forces in the 1970s with the Norton Interpol. Adapting the 588cc air-cooled twin-rotor P42 Aurora for police use and getting the Interpol 2 into production took until 1984. To speed up getting the bike into production a number of Yamaha parts were used including the forks and electrics. The initial batch of 140 machines were supplied to 20 police forces in the UK.

The machine was not available to the public, but sold to police forces, military police, particularly the Royal Air Force Police, and the RAC. Sales were restricted because of the very specific maintenance regime needed and the trained riders who would not ignore the temperature gauge, overheating being a problem with air-cooled Wankel engines. At the end of the production run a small number of machines were fitted with water-cooled engines. Production ended in 1989.

=== Classic ===
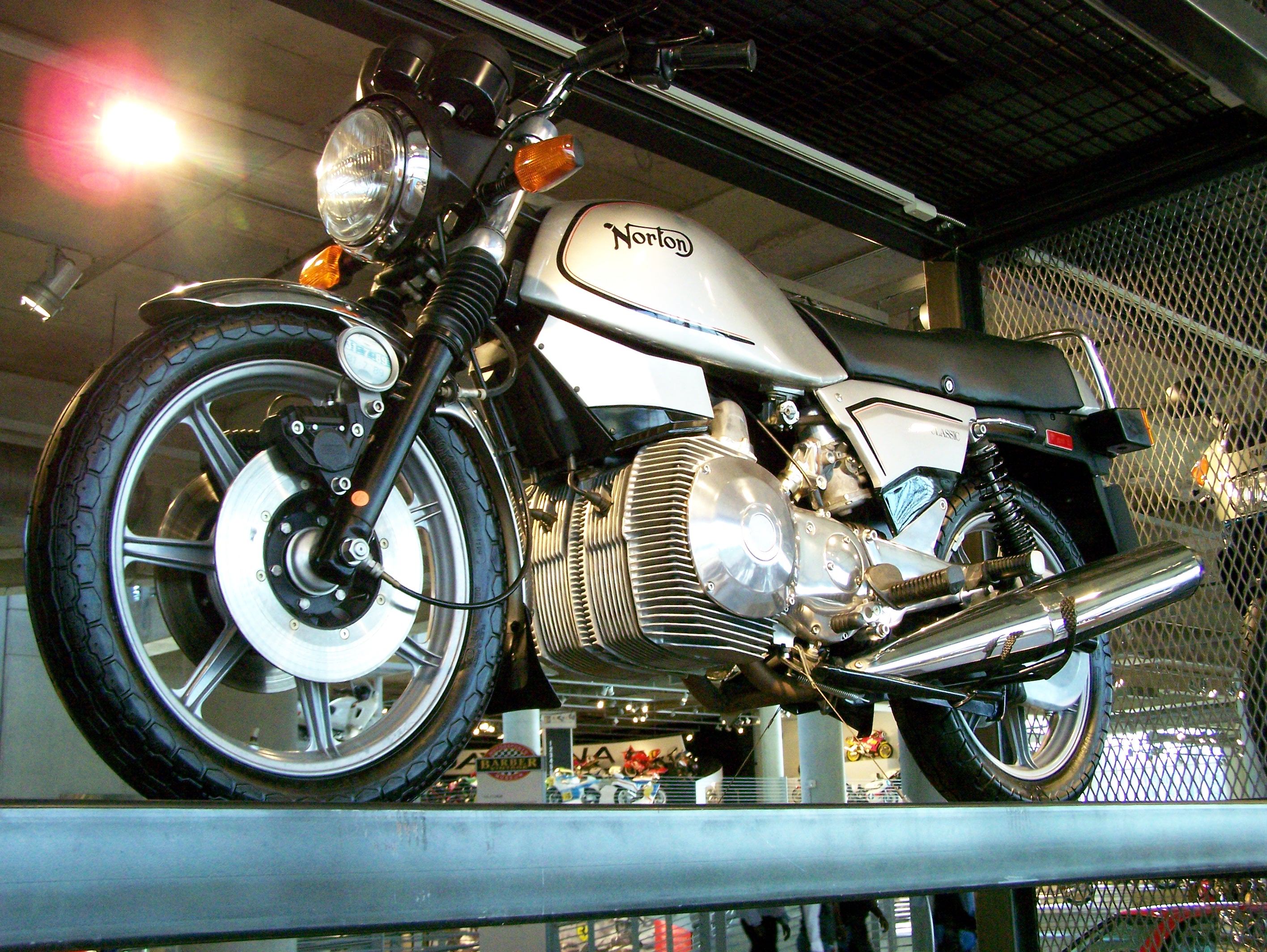
Norton Classic on display at the Barber Vintage Motorsport Museum, Birmingham, Alabama

Developed from the Interpol 2, the Classic used the same 588 cc engine but was stripped of the fairing and bodywork. The naked bike was available to the public but production was limited to 100 bikes and sold out soon after its 1987 introduction. Engine problems had been resolved during the Interpol 2's production as the engine was now more reliable. The bikes were finished in Norton's traditional silver and black finish.

=== Commander ===
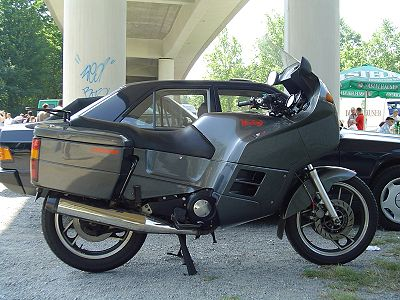
Norton Commander

Launched in 1988, the Commander was the first water-cooled production rotary Norton. Adding water-cooling to the twin-rotor 588cc engine enabled the compression ratio to be raised and power output increased to 85 bhp (63 kW). The engine was fitted in a new box-section spine frame that held a 2 imp qt (2,300 ml; 77 US fl oz) oil tank and acted as the plenum chamber for the air induction. Suspension was by Kayaba telescopic forks and a rear swinging arm with Koni shock absorbers. Wheels, brakes, instruments and controls were sourced from the Yamaha XJ900. Modified bodywork from the Interpol 2 was fitted.

The Commander received generally positive reviews from the press, Superbike being particularly impressed by the smoothness of the bike. Criticism that the luggage case were not removable was addressed by fitting removable cases on later production machines.

The bike was expensive at £7,500 which was 25% more expensive than the benchmark luxury sport tourer BMW K100LT. As Norton had no dealer network, bikes needed to be serviced at the Shenstone factory. When Norton hit financial problems in 1992 and production ended less than 300 Commanders had been sold.

=== RC588 ===
Norton employee Brian Crighton was convinced he could raise the output of the rotary engine to 120 bhp (89 kW). The factory gave him permission to build a racer but in his own time and expense. Crighton developed an 'exhaust ejector' that used an exhaust venturi to pull cooling air through the engine. This allowed an unrestricted airflow to the carbs which increased power.

Using a modified scrapped Interpol 2 engine and a frame also modified from an Interpol 2, a prototype was built. The bike was tested at MIRA and achieved 170 mph (270 km/h). The factory became interested in the racer and made the caretaker's house into a race shop. A frame was commissioned from Spondon and within 6 weeks a prototype works racer, the RC588, was ready. In its debut race at Darley Moor in August 1987 Malcolm Heath finished third.

Development continued in 1988 with riders Simon Buckmaster and Trevor Nation. In August stand-in rider Andy McGladdery achieved the bikes first win at Carnaby Raceway. Nation then went on to win at Mallory Park, Cadwell Park and Darley. A spare bike was available at the end of season Powerbike International at Brands Hatch and Steve Spray was invited to ride it and had a dominant win. A John Player marketing executive was at the meeting and, impressed with the bike, set up sponsorship for the team.

=== RCW588 ===
The water-cooled version of the rotary engine was used in 1989 and the bike designated the RCW588. The bikes were painted in the John Player black, silver and gold colours. Chris Collis was made team manager allowing Crighton to concentrate on development work. The bikes were ridden by Spray and Nation with Spray winning the 750 cc TT Formula One and 750cc Supercup British Championships. At the end of the year ex-Honda Britain manager, Barry Symmons, was given the job of team manager.

In 1990 Robert Dunlop was recorded at 302 km/h (188 mph) on the RCW588 on his way to victory in the North West 200. He finished 3rd in the Senior TT the next month. Nation won the TT Superbike Championship. Following disagreements with Symmons, Crighton left Norton in late 1990.

Ron Haslam joined the team as a development rider in 1991.

=== NRS588 ===
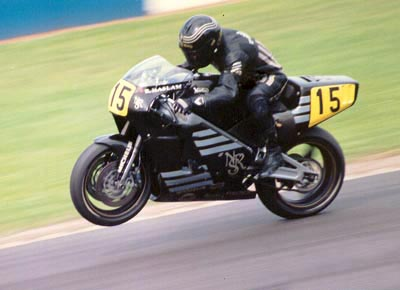
Ron Haslam on the NRS588

Symmons employed Ron Williams of Maxton Engineering to design a new frame for the race bikes. The monoshock frame was fabricated by Harris Performance Products. The engine ran 'backwards', was fitted with a belt primary drive and the bike was fitted with a 6 speed Yamaha gearbox. The new bike, designated as the NRS588, was introduced in mid 1991.

Haslam finished second in the 1991 British Supercup championship after winning several races. The FIA agreed the Norton could enter 500cc GPs and, as a wildcard, Haslam finished 12th in the 1991 British motorcycle Grand Prix.

In 1992 John Player decided the TT races were too dangerous and didn't want to be associated with the event. The factory leased a bike to Steve Hislop for the TT. The bike was painted white and sponsored by the British importer for ABUS. Hislop won the Senior TT. Dunlop finished second in the British Supercup championship.

With Norton in financial crisis and John Player terminating sponsorship, the racing programme was terminated at the end of 1992.

=== F1 ===
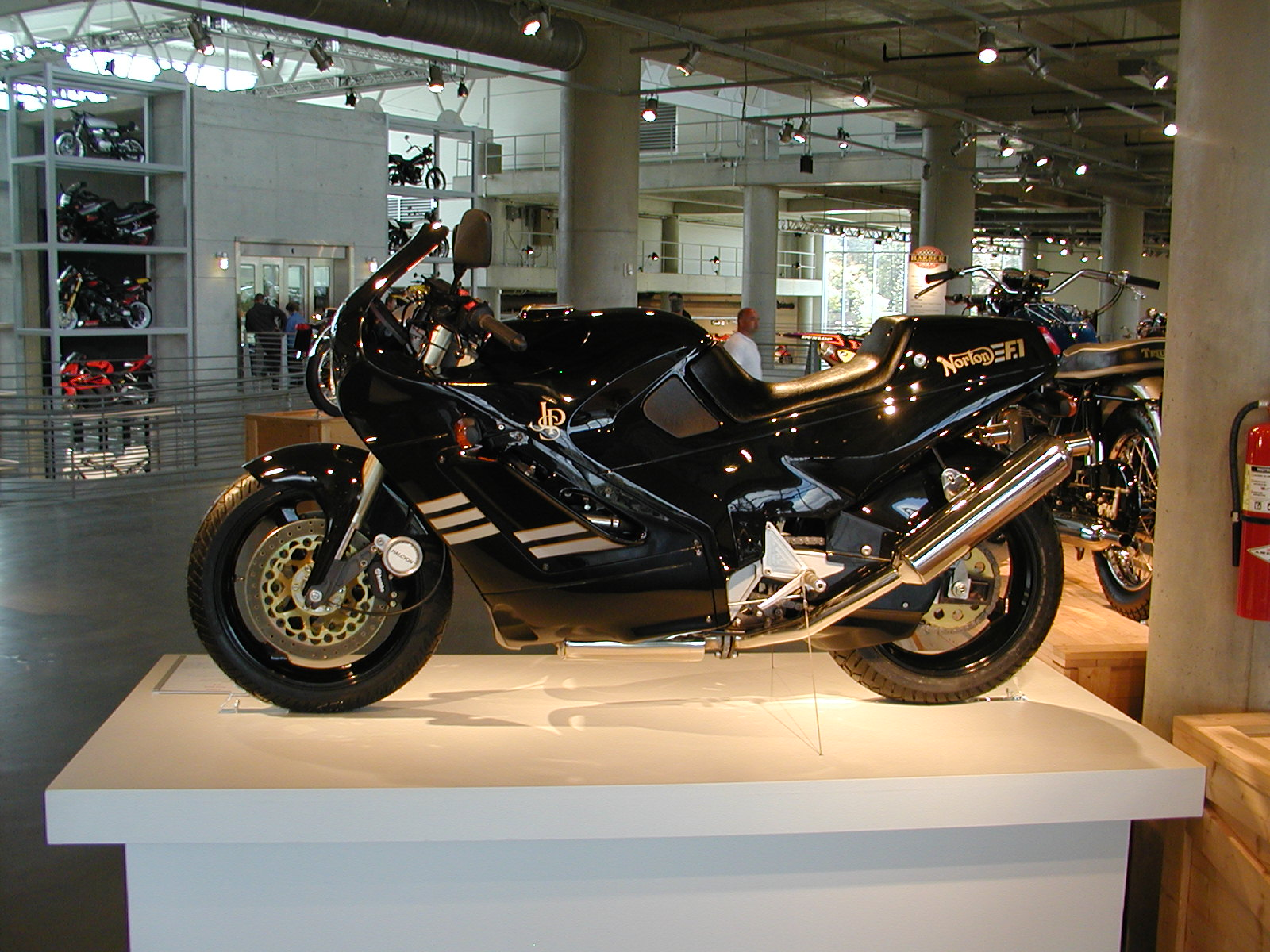
Norton F1 on display at the Barber Vintage Motorsport Museum, Birmingham, Alabama

After the success of the works racers in 1989, Norton introduced the F1 superbike in 1990. The bike used the same Spondon frame and White Power suspension as the racers. A 5 speed gear cluster from a Yamaha FZR1000 was used fitted into a Norton casing. A the Yamaha cluster had two shafts as opposed to three in the Triumph cluster previously used on other models. This required the engine to run 'backwards'. To achieve this the Commander based rotor housing was turned 180° in the frame. Larger inlet ports, revised port timing and twin Mikuni downdraft carburettors increased power output to 94 bhp (70 kW).

The all-enclosing bodywork was designed by the British company Seymour Powell and won several design awards. Finished in the JPS colours of black, gold and grey around 140 F1s were produced.

=== F1 Sport ===
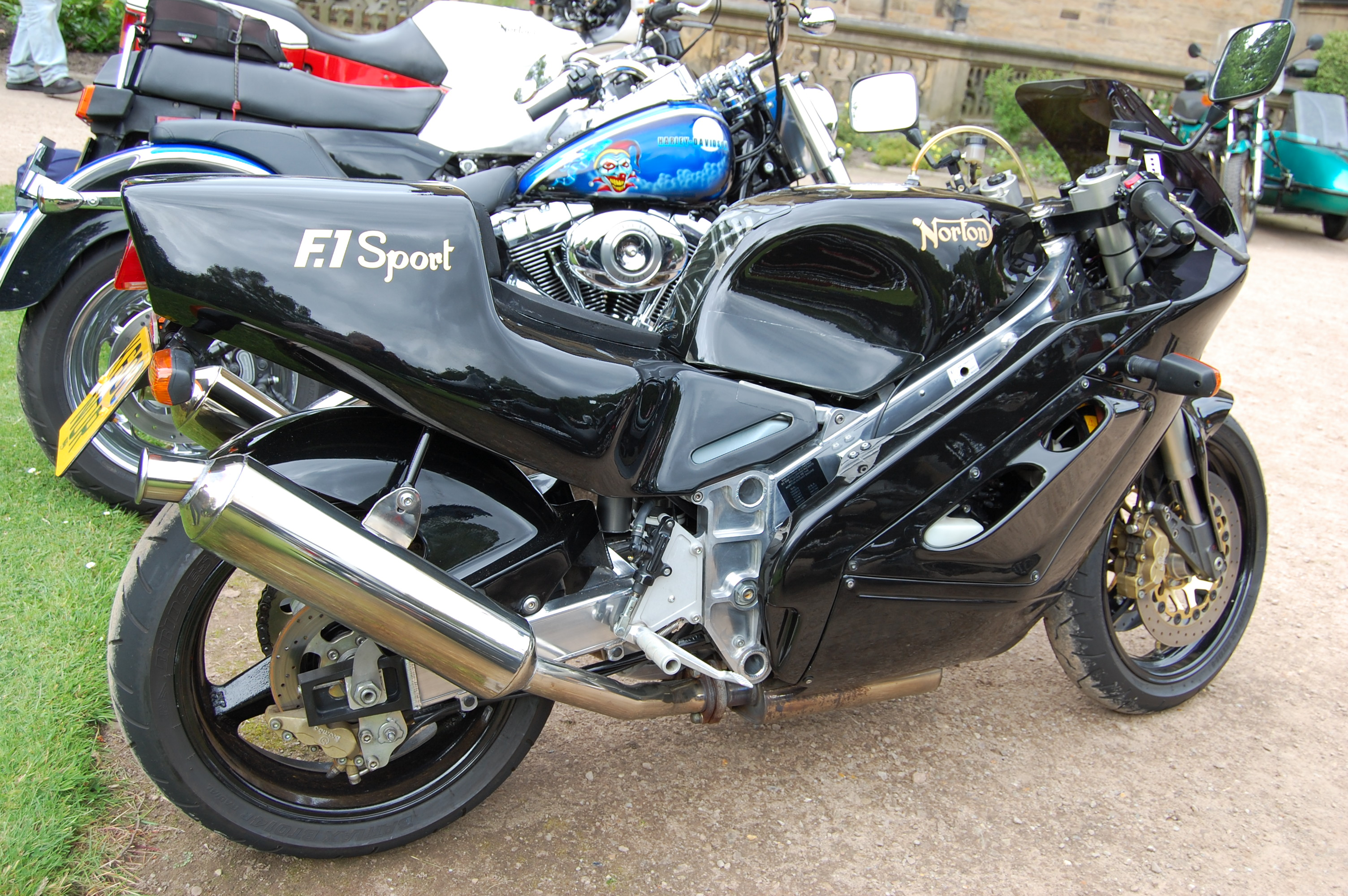
Norton F1 Sport

The F1 sport was born out of attempts to get the F1 through the European emission standards test. The Commander had previously passed the tests whereas the F1 had failed. Changing the F1's Mikuni carburettors to the SU carburettors used on the Commander and making the bodywork less enveloping to allow the engine to run cooler enabled the bike to pass the emissions test. The change of carbs also improved low speed throttle response during town riding which had been a problem on the F1. Around 70 F1 Sports were manufactured, a third of which were sold in Germany as the Norton TT.

=== F2 ===
Norton showed a F2 prototype at the 1992 Birmingham Motorcycle Show. It was to replace the F1. The engine was an updated version of the F1's 588 cc engine and produced 95 bhp (71 kW), 5 bhp more than the F1. It breathed through SU carburettors which would help the bike pass the European noise regulations due to be introduced in 1995. The frame, which was made by Spondons, replicates the Harris-built frame on which Steve Hislop won the 1992 IOM TT. Bodywork was designed by Styling International and used carbon fibre components. Suspension was from a Yamaha FZR and gearbox, wheels and brakes were also sourced from Yamaha. Norton claimed the bike would weigh 408 lb (185 kg), 110 lb less than the F1.

Norton's precarious financial situation prevented the bike going in production.

=== NRS588 Hizzy Replica ===
In 2004 Negus and Seifert's Norton Motors Ltd produced 2 replicas of Steve Hislop’s TT winning NRS588 from factory spares. They also supplied a kit of parts to a German enthusiast to convert his F1 Sport.

=== Roton/Crighton Racing ===
==== RGP588 ====
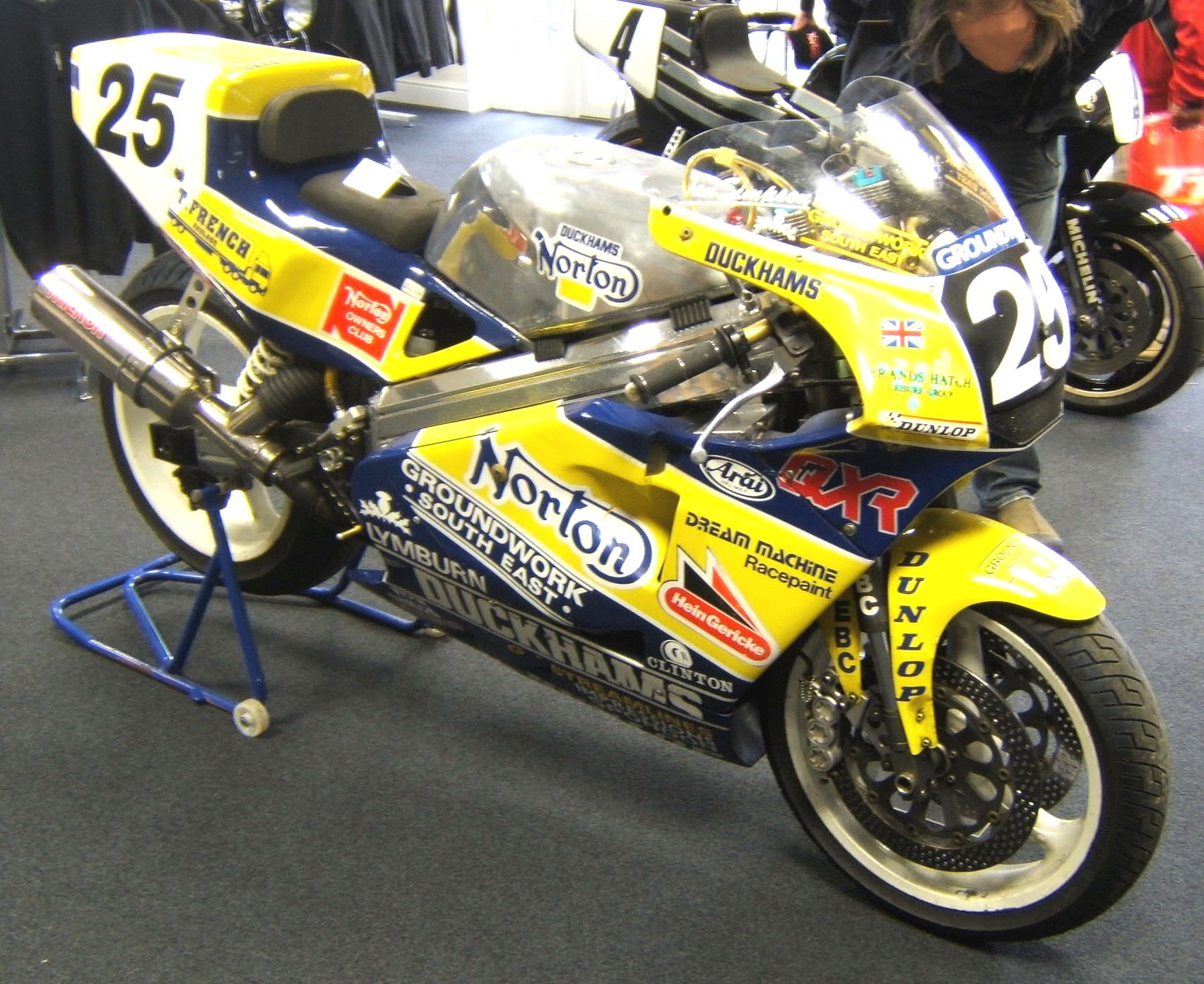
Duckhams Norton on display in 2009 at Nobles Park, Douglas, Isle of Man

After leaving Norton Crighton started his own racing team and manufactured his own bikes under the Roton Banner. The RGP588, launched in March 1991, used the same engine as the RCW588 and was mated to a Yamaha 0W01 6 speed gearbox. Mikuni CV carburettors were fitted. The engine was fitted in a triple spar frame with twin shock rear suspension and WP front forks. Australian businessman Chris Oldfield was interested in manufacturing the bike in Australia and the team went to Australia.

After lobbying the FIM, the bike was permitted to compete in the 1991 Australian motorcycle Grand Prix at Eastern Creek Raceway. Rider Steve Spray finished 15th in the race. Australian Grant Hodson rode the bike to a win in a Formula One event at Eastern Creek. The deal with Oldfield never materialised and the team returned to the UK.

In 1993 Crighton teamed up with Colin Seeley to race the bikes under Duckhams sponsorship and livery. Rider Jim Moodie was second in the 1993 Supercup and in 1994 Ian Simpson and Phil Borley finished 1st and 3rd in the Supercup, winning 14 races between them.

After pressure from other manufacturers, the organisers of the Supercup banned rotary engines for 1995.

==== NRV588 ====
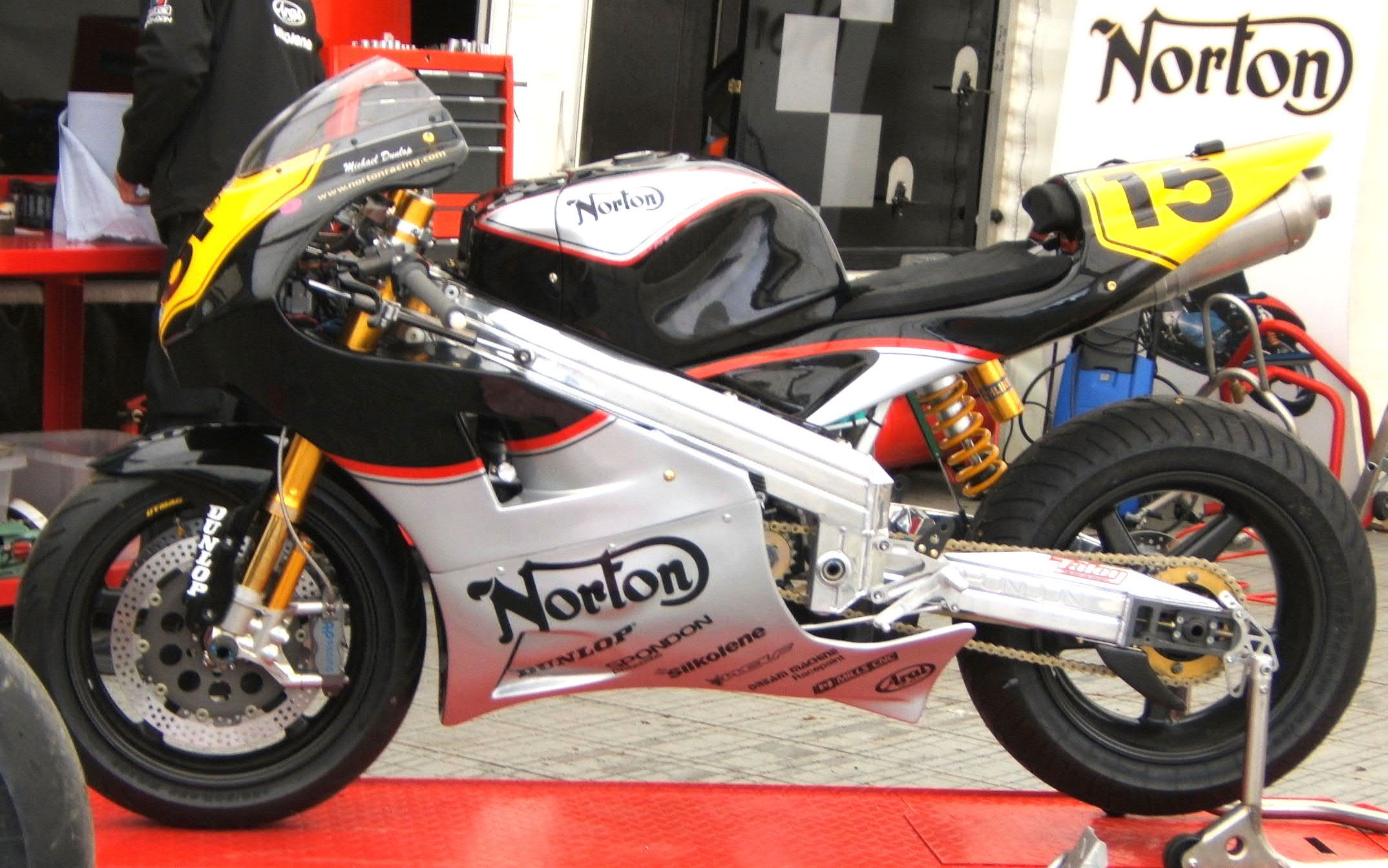
Michael Dunlop's NRV588 racer seen at the 2009 TT races

Crighton continued to develop the rotary engine with backing from Roy Richards of the National Motorcycle Museum. Using a spare 1994 engine, Crighton produced the NRV588 prototype. It had been upgraded with direct fuel injection, traction control, a variable-length intake system and a ride-by-wire throttle. The engine produced 165 bhp (123 kW) @ 11,450 rpm with a wide spread of power. The engine was fitted to a Spondon aluminum twin-spar frame with Öhlins suspension. Bodywork was made by Harris Performance. The bike was more compact than previous Norton rotaries and weighed 289 lb (131 kg).

Stuart Garner's newly formed Norton company became interested in the NRV588 and entered Michael Dunlop in the 2009 Isle of Man TT on the machine but Dunlop failed to qualify the bike. Garner intended to manufacture the NRV588 and a road legal derivative but eventually decided to concentrate the factory's efforts on the Kenny Dreer derived 961.

==== CR700W ====
Norton reached an agreement with Dorna Sports in 2010 to enter MotoGP in 2012 when the regulations changed to include 1,000cc machines. Norton were provisionally awarded two grid spots for 2012. Work began on enlarging the 588 rotary to 700cc, which would be permitted under the new regulations.

After Norton dropped its involvement with rotaries Crighton continued to develop the 700. In 2013 he unveiled the Crighton Racing CR700P. The engine used a pressurized gas cooling system allowing the engine to be run at high rpm for long periods. The engine produced 200 bhp (150 kW) and the complete bike weighed 135 kg (298 lb).

Crighton teamed up with Gilo Industries, who manufacture aero enginines. In November 2021 the Crighton CR700W, a track-day bike, was announced. 25 of these bikes are to be built. The bikes produce over 200 bhp (150 kW) at the back wheel and weigh 130 kg (290 lb). Various options such as traction control and quick-shift are available.
