= Norton 961 Commando =

Motorcycle

Norton 961/SS Commando
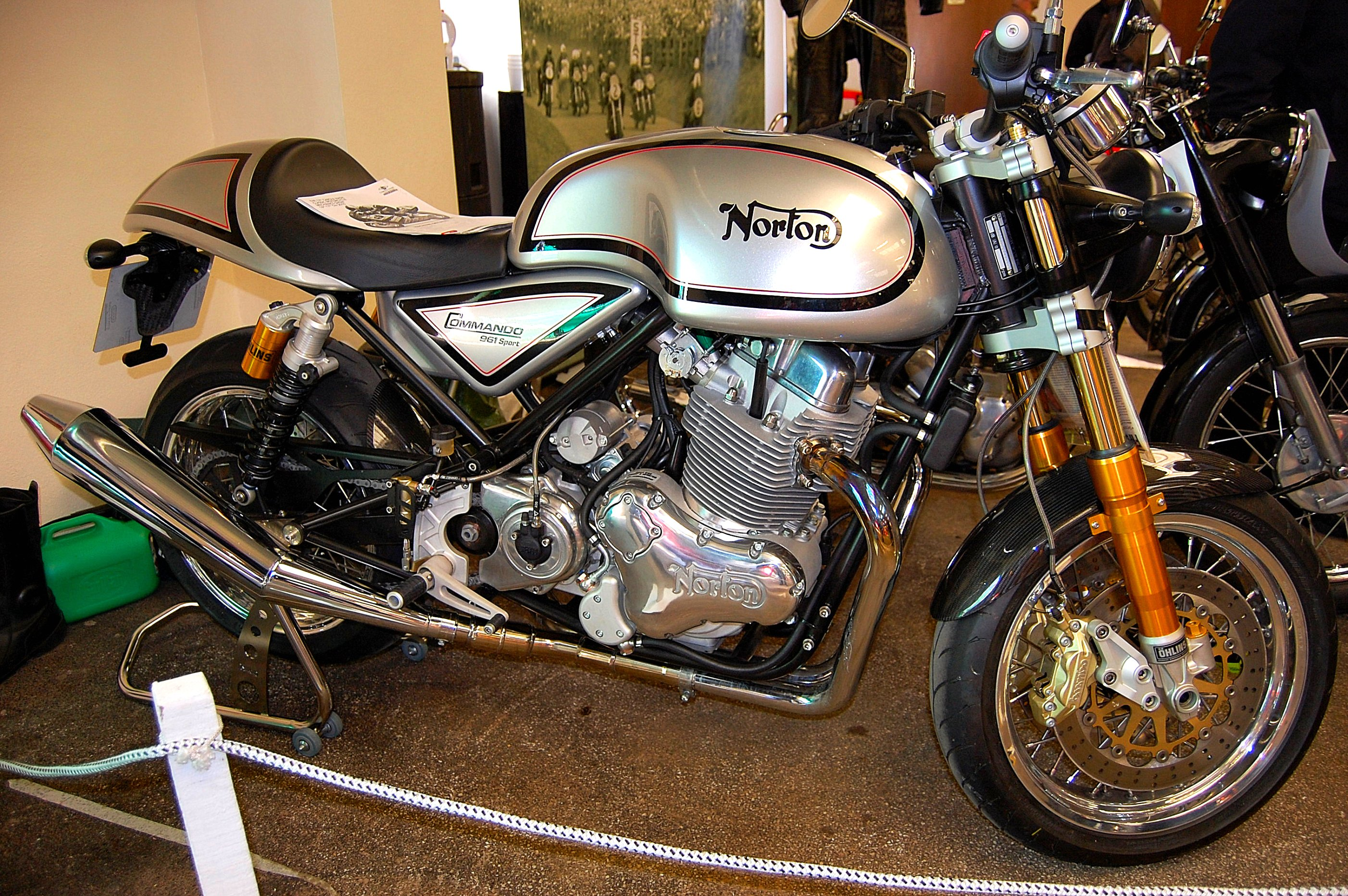
- Manufacturer: Norton Motorcycles
- Production: 2006–present
- Engine: 961 cc (59 cu in) air-cooled, Four-stroke, 270° crank angle, Parallel twin with push-rod valve actuation, 3 bearing crank balancer shaft, 2 valve per cylinder
- Bore / stroke: 88 mm × 79 mm (3.5 in × 3.1 in)
- Power: 80 bhp (60 kW) @ 6500 rpm
- Torque: 65 lb⋅ft (88 N⋅m) @ 5200 rpm
- Transmission: 5 speed
- Suspension: Front: 43 mm Öhlins RSU - Adjustable preload Rear: Öhlins reservoir-style twin shocks
- Brakes: Dual disc front, single disc rear
- Wheelbase: 1,435 mm (56.5 in)
- Seat height: 813 mm (32.0 in)
- Weight: 188 kg (414 lb) (dry)
- Fuel capacity: 17.03 litres (4.50 gallons)

The Norton 961/SS Commando is a motorcycle that was produced by Norton Motorcycles, the Oregon based company that bought the rights to the Norton brand name. Owner Kenny Dreer progressed from restoring and upgrading Norton Commandos to producing whole machines. He modernised the design and in the early 2000s went into production of the VR880. This machine was built on the basis of the original Commando, with upgraded components and a significantly modified engine.

Dreer produced 50 of these machines before deciding to build an all-new motorcycle. With funding from Oliver Curme, Dreer hired a small design and development team led by Paul Gaudio (Design and development director), Simon-Pierre Smith (Lead Engineer), and Patrick Leyshock (Testing, Sourcing.)

The 961 Commando never reached production in America due to lack of funding, and the company closed its doors in April 2006. The Commando 961 SS combined traditional Norton cafe racer styling with new technology. This included carbon fibre wheels to reduce weight, a counterbalanced engine, and a chro-moly tubular steel frame.

== Donington years ==
After fifteen years of US ownership UK businessman Stuart Garner, owner of Norton Racing Ltd, acquired the rights to the Norton Commando brand. His company, Norton Motorcycles (UK) Ltd, established a new factory at Donington Park, Leicestershire in 2008 to manufacture a new Commando model, designed by Simon Skinner. There are three models in the new Commando range: a limited edition of 200 Commando 961 SEs, a Cafe Racer and a Sport model.

In March 2010 Norton shipped the first new Norton Commando for over 30 years; and by mid-April 2010 the company was shipping 5-10 new machines per week. The engine is a 961 cc fuel-injected air-cooled ohv 270° parallel-twin that produces 79 bhp (59 kW). The short-stroke engine is oversquare, with an 88 x 79 mm bore and stroke. At the bike's front are inverted (USD) forks and twin disc brakes. The engine (rather like the BSA pre-swingarm A7) is "semi-unit", in that the 5-speed gearbox is a separate casting, but is bolted directly to the primary chaincase. Some styling is reminiscent of the original Norton Commando, especially the engine and petrol tank. The new Norton has received favourable press reviews.

In a March 2012 interview, Garner revealed that Norton was receiving support from the UK Government's Export Credit Guarantee service, which should alleviate cash-flow problems and enable a significant increase in factory output. Garner added that Norton now makes an increasing number of components "in-house", reducing reliance on outside suppliers.

== New ownership ==
The 961 Commando was very well received; its design echoed that of the original pre-unit pushrod design, but was more modern, with an output of 79bhp, five-gears, Ohlins suspension and effective disc brakes. Production continued for more than a decade, but the Donington factory closed in 2020, and the "Norton" trademarked name and assets were transferred to an Indian-owned firm, TVS Motor Company, based in Solar Park, Solihull. TVS further refined the design and improved the build quality, and the "upgraded" 961 was released in 2023 to great acclaim.

== See also ==
- Norton Motorcycle Company
- List of Norton motorcycles
