= Norton CS1 =

British motorcycle

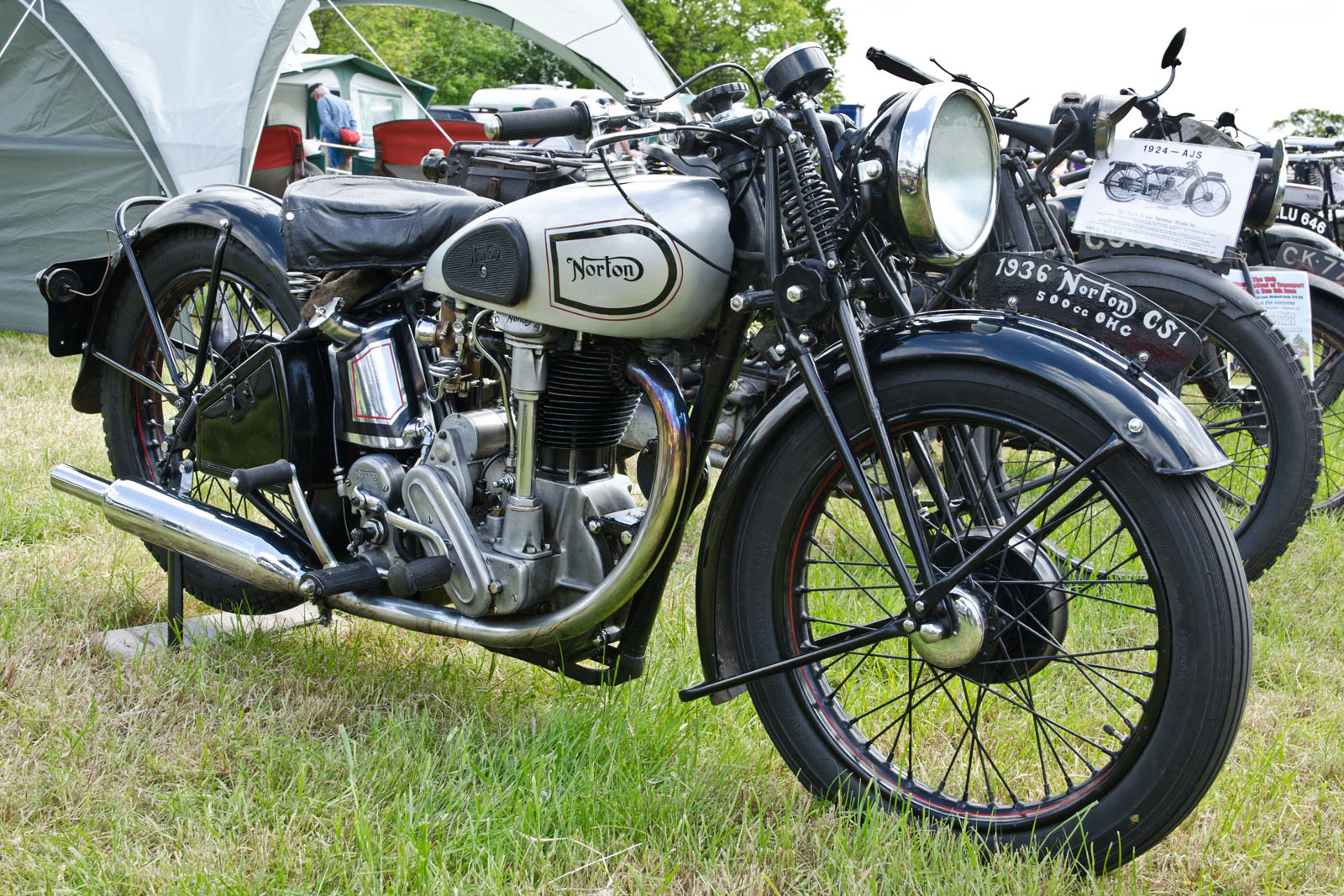
- Manufacturer: Norton Motorcycles
- Also called: Cammy Norton. Cricket Bat Motor (1920s).
- Production: 1927–1939
- Engine: 490cc bevel drive overheadcam single cylinder
- Top speed: 85 mph
- Power: 25 bhp
- Brakes: drum
- Weight: 319 pounds (145 kg) (wet)

The CS1 was a Norton motorcycle between 1927 and 1939. Originally built as a TT racer, and Norton's first design of an overhead cam engine, it proved successful as a TT Replica road bike.

After the early 1930s redesign of Norton's cammy models by Arthur Carroll, the CS1 became an upmarket road bike. The 500 cc CS1 and its smaller sibling 350 cc CJ1 continued on until the outbreak of WW2 in 1939.

Many later touring CS1 models were upgraded for racing, by adding and subtracting all the optional racing bits for Internationals. The Norton catalog had a long list of such parts available. The identifying feature of 1930s CS1 Models is the stub fitted carburettor - Inter models had a bolt-on TT carburettor.

== Development ==
The Norton Camshaft Senior Model 1 (CS1) engine was designed by Walter Moore in 1927, based on the Norton ES2 pushrod engine and re-using many parts. The frame was a new full cradle design and with a close-ratio kickstart-less gearbox, 8-inch brakes, Amal TT carburettor, Lucas Racing magneto and a 3-gallon petrol tank. The CS1 was the standard for racing Nortons for the next 20 years. The magneto was moved to the rear of the engine and the bottom end was a traditional Norton design, but in the side of the crankcase was the oil pump housing and a pair of bevel gears to drive the long shaft which ran in a tube up the side of the engine to a second pair of gears driving the overhead camshaft.

== Racing success ==
Alec Bennett riding the CS1 on its first race won the Isle of Man Senior TT in 1927 and Stanley Woods set the fastest lap at 70.99 mph before retiring.

Unknown rider Tim Hunt won the Amateur TT in following year on a Norton CS1, setting a new TT record. He later used the same motorcycle to win the gold medal in the Scottish Six Days Trial.

In 1928 a Junior version of the CS1 with a 348cc engine and designated the Norton CJ was entered for the Isle of Man TT. The bore and stroke of this engine was 71 x 88 mm and it looked promising but 1928 proved to be an unlucky year for Norton, as there were technical problems with Walter Moore's redesigned cambox and only one major race was won that year. 1929 also went badly with reliability problems and only one win in the Spanish GP of 1929.

In March 1931 on Pendine Sands Joe Craig and Tim Hunt achieved a best speed on the CS1 of 118 mph. Also in 1931 the Norton CS1 took the first five places in Junior and Senior events, starting what was to prove Norton's most successful period, and until the end of the 1930s Norton dominated international events with wins in both classes throughout the decade. Tim Hunt became the first rider to win two TT races in one week, with success in the Junior TT Race in 3 h 34 min 21 s at an average speed of 73.4 mph and also the Senior TT Race in 3 h 23 min 28 s at an average speed of 77.90 mph.

== See also ==
- List of motorcycles of the 1920s
