= Öhlins =

Swedish automotive parts manufacturer

Öhlins Racing AB
- Type: Subsidiary
- Industry: Automotive industry
- Founded: 1976; 50 years ago
- Founder: Kenth Öhlin
- Headquarters: Upplands Väsby, Sweden
- Products: Suspension components
- Parent: Brembo (2025–present); Tenneco (2018–2024)
- Website: www.ohlins.com

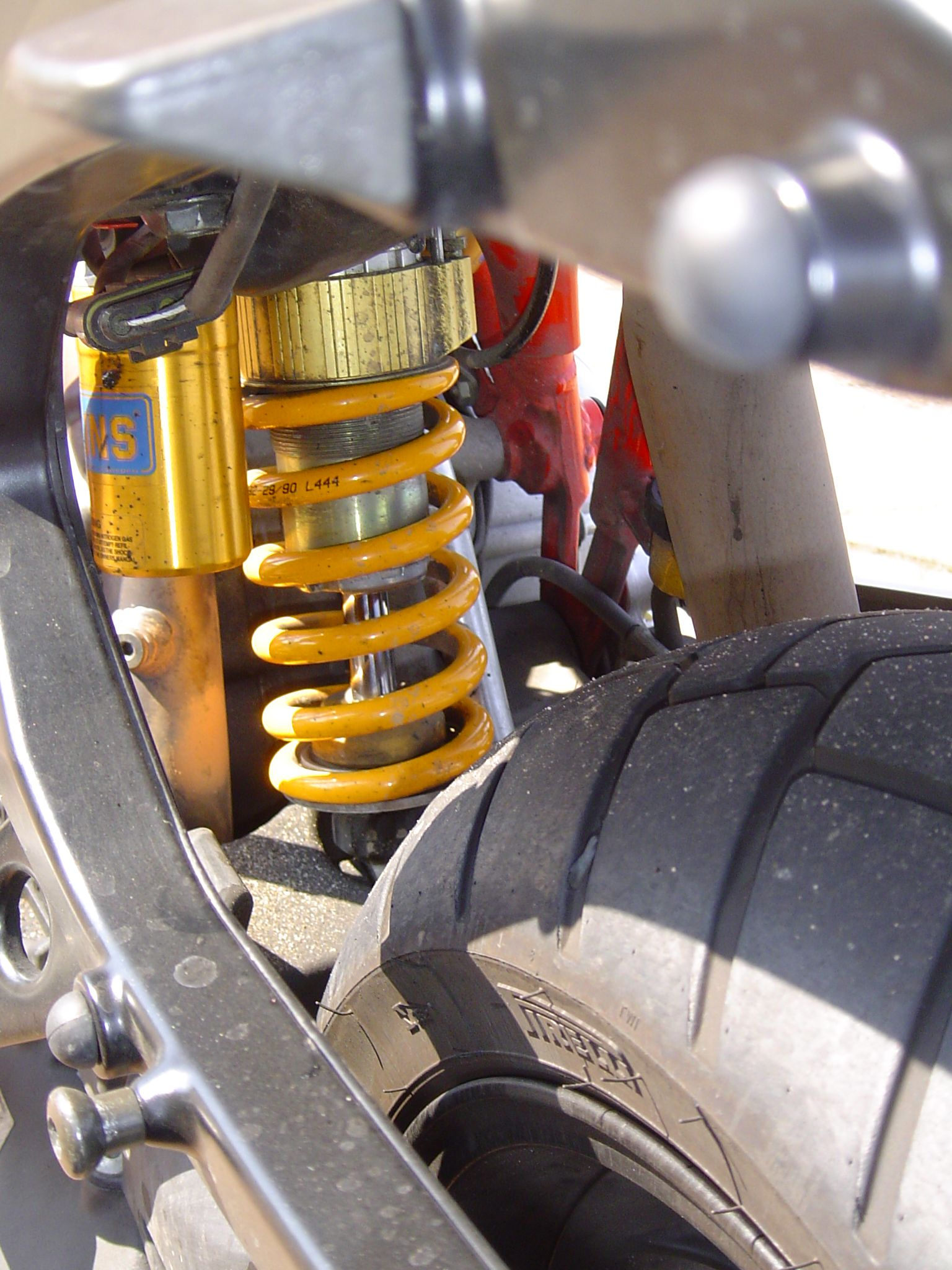
Öhlins Rear Monoshock

Öhlins Racing AB (commonly Öhlins) is a Swedish company that develops suspension systems for the automotive, motorcycle, mountain bike and motorsport industries. Approximately 97% of all production is exported and Öhlins has distribution in over 50 countries worldwide. The company also produces other types of vehicle components, including steering dampers and ride height control systems. A two-wheel drive system for motorcycles has been produced in the past.

Öhlins currently employs 320 people and is headquartered in Upplands Väsby, Sweden, where the main R&D departments and production site are also located. Öhlins also has branch offices and subsidiaries worldwide: Auto Norden and Öhlins CES in Sweden, Öhlins Asia in Thailand, Öhlins Distribution/Technical Centre in Germany, and Öhlins USA in North Carolina.

Öhlins is present in various forms of motorsport, such as MotoGP, Formula One, FIA World Endurance Championship, FIA World Rallycross Championship, World Rally Championship, World Superbike Championship and British Superbike Championship.

== History ==
Former motocross racer Kenth Öhlin founded the company in 1976, beginning working in his father's engineering workshop building exhaust pipes, engines and shock absorbers. Switching focus solely on suspension systems in the early 1980s.

In 1984, Öhlins developed their first mountain bike front suspension using telescopic forks. They progressed to producing a mountain bike rear suspensions. In 1986, Yamaha Motor Company became co-owner of Öhlins Racing AB but Öhlins continued to operate as an independent company within the Yamaha group. The company moved to its current headquarters in Upplands Väsby, Stockholm in 1990.

Öhlins USA opened a Subsidiary Sales & Distribution Centre in North Carolina, USA in 1997 with additional subsidiaries opening in 2007 (Öhlins Distribution & Test Center at Nürburgring), 2011 (Öhlins Auto Norden full service distributor for Nordic countries) and 2013 (Öhlins Asia Co., Ltd in Thailand).

In 1998, Öhlins became ISO 9001 certified and partnered with Tenneco Automotive for a continuously controlled Electronic System (CES). Mass production of the CES technology began in 2003 on the Volvo S60R.

2006 saw Öhlins launch its TTX system whilst in 2007 Kenth Öhlin reclaimed a 95% share of the company.

Noriyuki Haga became the first World Superbike race winner using Öhlins electronic suspension in 2008.

In 2015, Öhlins sold its five millionth CES valve and completed work on a new office building in Upplands Väsby. In November 2018, Tenneco bought a majority stake in Öhlins.

In October 2024, the Italian manufacturer of high-performance braking systems, Brembo, agreed to acquire Öhlins for $405 million. In January 2025, it was announced that the acquisition had been completed.

== Racing ==
As of 2017, Öhlins has won over 300 World Championship titles in both motorcycle and automotive classes.

Gennady Moiseyev secured the first Öhlins world championship in the 1978 250cc Motocross World Championship. Reclaiming the 250cc title in 1979 with Håkan Carlqvist, Öhlins also secured the 500cc title with Graham Noyce.

Öhlins repeated this success in 1980, 1981 and 1982, where they also won the 125cc and Sidecar World Championships.

In 1983, Yamaha rider Carlos Lavado became the first Öhlins road racing world champion, with victory in the 250cc Grand Prix Championship. The first 500cc MotoGP title came in 1984, with Eddie Lawson. Since then, further titles Grand Prix championships have been won with Álex Márquez, Álvaro Bautista, Arnaud Vincent, Casey Stoner, Danny Kent, Esteve Rabat, Gabor Talmacsi, John Kocinski, Jorge Lorenzo, Julian Simon, Kenny Roberts Jr, Loris Capirossi, Manuel Poggiali, Marc Márquez, Marco Melandri, Marco Simoncelli, Max Biaggi, Mike Di Meglio, Nicolás Terol, Pol Espargaro, Roberto Locatelli, Stefan Bradl, Tetsuya Harada, Toni Elias, Valentino Rossi and Wayne Rainey.

Fred Merkel won the 1988 and 1989 World Superbike Championships using Öhlins suspension, with additional titles being won by Ben Spies, Carl Fogarty, Carlos Checa, Doug Polen, James Toseland, Max Biaggi, Neil Hodgson, Raymond Roche, Scott Russell, Sylvain Guintoli, Troy Bayliss and Troy Corser.

In 1993, Nigel Mansell won the CART IndyCar series whilst in 1994 Toni Haikonen claimed Öhlins first world title on snow in the EC Snowmobile series.

Tommi Mäkinen won the World Rally Championship using Öhlins in 1996, 1997, 1998 and 1999. The Company's first World Touring Car Championship came with Andy Priaulx in 2007.

Öhlins has also won the Le Mans 24 hour, Speedway World Championship, World Endurance Championship, Indianapolis 500, Snocross and X-Games as well as national Championships such as the British Superbike Championship, DTM and MotoAmerica.

2018, Loïc Bruni won the 2018 Mountain Biking Downhill World Championship riding Öhlins suspension.

== Products ==
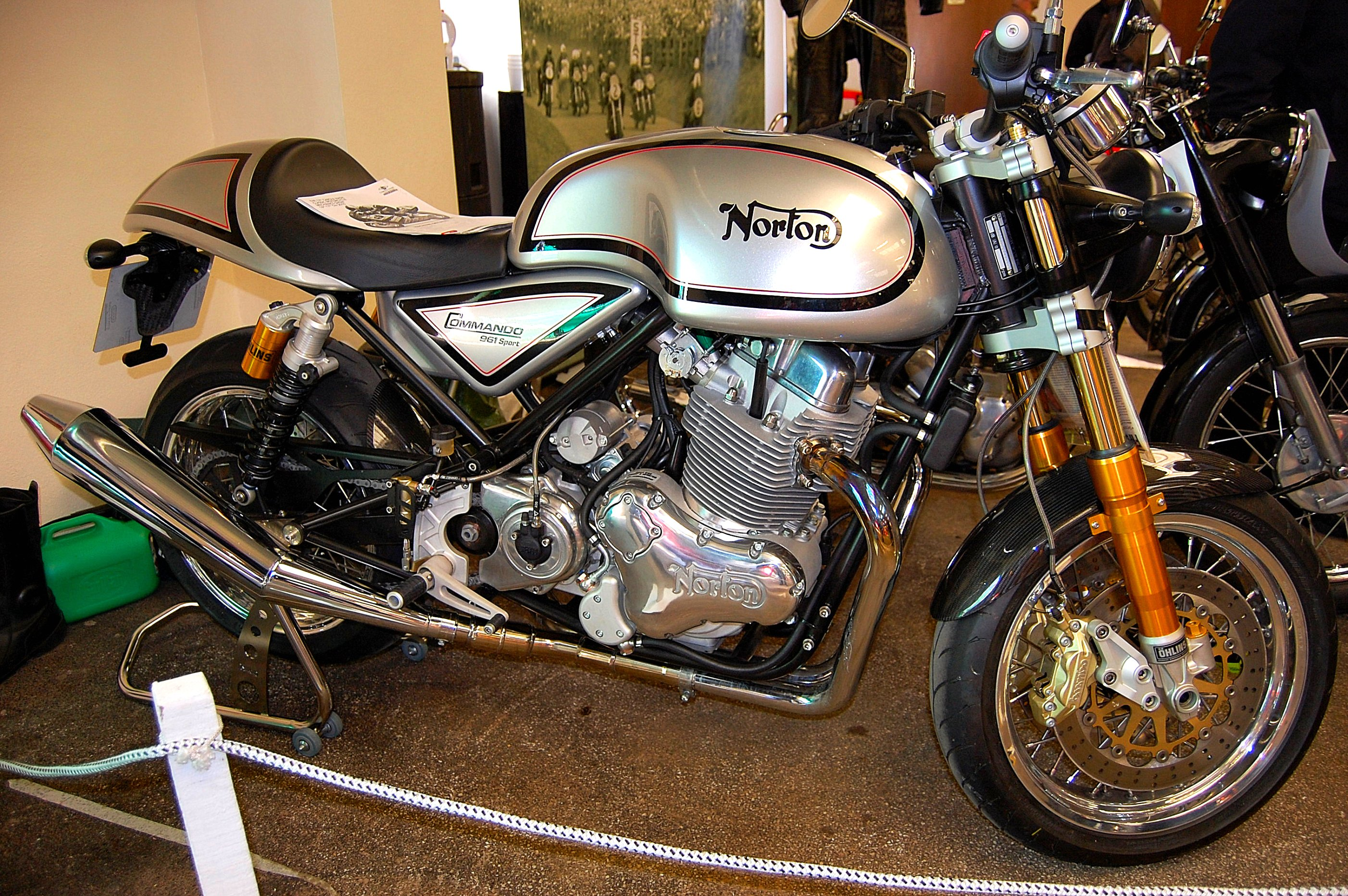
Norton Commando 961 Sport with full Öhlins suspensions

Öhlins products are currently used on Motorcycles, Automobiles, ATVs, Snowmobiles and Mountain Bikes.
