= Norton Model 7 Dominator =

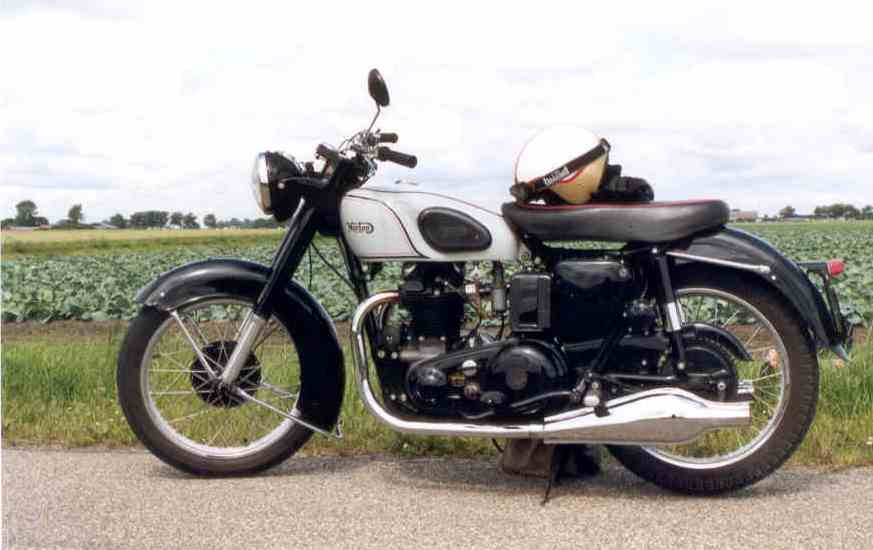
- Model 7 Dominator swinging arm version
- Manufacturer: Norton
- Production: 1949–1955
- Assembly: Bracebridge Street, Birmingham
- Successor: Norton Model 77 Dominator
- Engine: 497 cc (30.3 cu in) air-cooled OHV vertical twin
- Bore / stroke: 66 mm × 72.6 mm (2.60 in × 2.86 in)
- Compression ratio: 6.7:1
- Top speed: 95 mph (153 km/h)
- Power: 29 bhp (22 kW) @ 6,000 rpm
- Ignition type: Lucas magneto
- Transmission: Wet clutch, 4-speed, chain drive
- Suspension: Front: telescopic forks Rear: plunger (1949-53), swinging arm (1953-55)
- Brakes: 7 in (180 mm) drum front & rear
- Tyres: 3.00x21 front, 3.50x19 rear (1949-53); 3.25x19 front, 3.50x19 rear (1953-55)
- Wheelbase: 54.5 in (1,380 mm)
- Dimensions: L: 84.5 in (2,150 mm); W: 28 in (710 mm)
- Seat height: 31 in (790 mm)
- Weight: 413 lb (187 kg) (dry)
- Fuel capacity: 3.75 imp gal (17.0 L; 4.50 US gal)

The Norton Model 7 Dominator is a 500 cc vertical twin motorcycle that the Norton Motorcycle Company made from 1949 until 1955. It was the first of the Norton Dominator series of motorcycles. The engine was designed by Bert Hopwood, and departed from Norton's previous practice of making only single-cylinder machines. The Model 7 was used in Japan as a police motorcycle.

== Background ==
In the United Kingdom after World War 2, motorcycle manufacturers resumed production of civilian machines after making military machines. The UK Government had launched an "Export or Die" campaign to aid economic recovery from war. Triumph's 1938 Speed twin had been well-received, and other manufacturers started to design their own 500 cc twins.

Having worked under designers Val Page at Ariel and Edward Turner at Triumph, where he assisted with the design of the Triumph Speed Twin, Hopwood was recruited by Norton to design a new twin engine.

The new Model 7 Dominator, using Hopwood's engine in adapted Norton ES2 cycle parts, was launched at the November 1948 Earls Court Motorcycle Show.

== Technical details ==
=== Engine and transmission ===
The engine has a 360-degree built-up crankshaft, with central flywheels. This meant that a central main bearing could not be fitted. The outer main bearings were a ball bearing on the timing side and roller bearings on the drive side. Alloy connecting rods were split at the big end, and used a bush for the big end bearing. The crankshaft and conrods had been tested in an earlier Norton twin, which was designed by J.E. Moore, but did not going into production. The camshaft is in front of the engine, driven by a chain from a half-speed pinion. For ignition, a Lucas magneto is fitted at the rear of the engine, and to power the lights a dynamo is fitted at the front of the engine. Both are driven by chains.

The cylinder block is cast iron and has an integral push rod tube. The cylinder head is also cast iron, and has cast-in rocker boxes to eliminate potential oil leaks between head and rocker boxes. A shallow combustion chamber, combined with low included-angle valve configuration and flat top pistons gives a good swirl effect. The head has widely splayed exhaust ports to aid cooling. A single Amal carburettor fuels the engine via an alloy manifold. On the show model, the manifold was part of the head casting.

The engine has a traditional long stroke, with a bore and stroke of 66 mm (2.6 in) x 72.6 mm (2.86 in), and produced 29 bhp (22 kW) at 6,000 rpm.

An alloy version of the cylinder head was available to special order in 1952. This had been developed for use on Norton competition machines from 1950 onwards, including the Norton twins used in the 1950 ISDT Competition.

Primary drive is by chain to a wet clutch, and is enclosed in a pressed steel chaincase. To fit in the ES2 frame, a new 4 speed "lay-down" gearbox was fitted. Final drive is by chain.

=== Cycle parts ===
The Model 7 has the same cycle parts as the single-cylinder ES2, which comprises Norton's "garden gate" plunger frame and long "Roadholder" telescopic fork. Brakes are single 7 in (180 mm) drum brakes front and rear. From 1952, the Model 7 engine was fitted in the swinging arm "featherbed frame" to create the lighter and better handling Model 88. However, production of the Model 7 continued, as the featherbed was thought unsuitable for sidecar use.

A new rear sub-frame was designed by development engineer Bob Collier in 1953, giving the bike swinging arm rear suspension. A larger 8 in (200 mm) front brake was fitted in 1954.

== Australian models – rigid framed version ==
Norton' factory records show that the initial production of the Model 7 was for Australia. At the August 1950 Brisbane show, Australia's annual motorcycle show, a rigid framed version of the Model 7 was shown on the stand of Andersons Agencies, an Australian Norton dealer. Bob Collier of Norton's experimental department had produced a prototype rigid framed model for the 1950 racing season. The rigid model was promoted as being 2 inches (51 millimetres) lower and 10 lb (4.5 kg) lighter than the plunger version. The rigid model was known variously as the Model 77, Model 77 Sport Twin, Dominator Rigid, and the Dominator Rigid Sport. Factory records show that 237 rigid machines were sent to Australia between April 1950 and February 1952.
