= Norton Model 77 Dominator =

Motorcycle

- Manufacturer: Norton
- Production: 1956-1958
- Assembly: Bracebridge Street, Birmingham
- Predecessor: Norton Model 7 Dominator
- Engine: 596 cc (36.4 cu in) air-cooled OHV vertical twin
- Bore / stroke: 68 mm × 82 mm (2.7 in × 3.2 in)
- Power: 31 bhp (23 kW) @ 5,750 rpm
- Transmission: Wet clutch, 4-speed, chain drive
- Suspension: Front: telescopic forks Rear: swinging arm
- Brakes: 8 in (200 mm) drum front, 7 in (180 mm) drumrear

The 1st Norton Model 77 Dominator was a 500 cc all iron vertical twin rigid framed Norton motorcycle manufactured by Norton Motors Ltd from 1950 to 1952. All 237 examples were exported to Australia. Very little publicity surrounded this model - so much so that it was denied that they existed for some decades. It is possible that they were intended to be sidecar haulers, but the stock Model 7 - with the identical all iron engine- was equipped with sidecar mounting points, so this aspect is still a matter of discussion.

The 2nd, and more well known Norton Model 77 Dominator was a 600 cc vertical twin motorcycle manufactured by the Norton Motorcycle Company from 1956 to 1958. It was based on the Model 7 that it superseded, and was primarily intended for sidecar use. Norton modified the featherbed frame of the 88 and 99 models in 1957 to be suitable for sidecar use making the Model 77 superfluous and the model was dropped in 1958.

== Technical details ==
=== 600cc Engine ===
Based on the 1949 Bert Hopwood designed 500 cc twin engine, the engine had been enlarged to 600 cc by enlarging the 500's bore and stroke of 66 mm (2.6 in) x 72.6 mm (2.86 in) to 68 mm (2.7 in) x 82 mm (3.2 in). The same engine was used in the 99 Dominator.

=== Cycle parts ===
The 77 used the same cycle parts as the previous Model 7, which was also used on the ES2. The single downtube frame was made of tubes and brazed lugs. Front forks were Norton's roadholders.
