= Norton Big 4 =

British motorcycle produced between 1907 and 1954

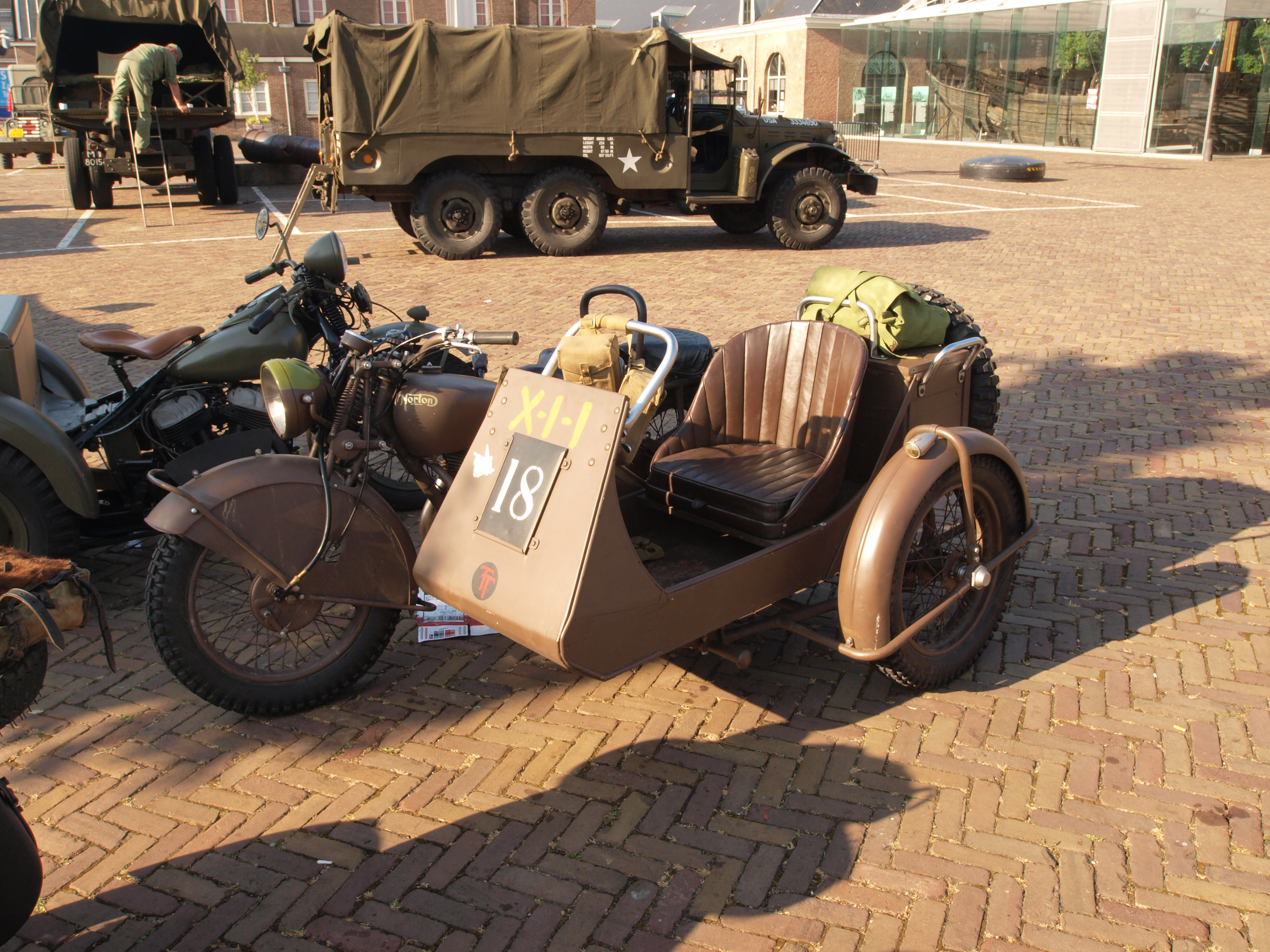
- Manufacturer: Norton Motorcycle Company
- Also called: Model 1
- Production: 1907 - 1954
- Engine: 633cc, side valve air cooled single
- Bore / stroke: 82 mm × 120 mm (3.2 in × 4.7 in)
- Top speed: 68mph
- Power: 14 bhp
- Transmission: Four speed gearbox to chain final drive
- Suspension: Girder front forks, solid rear. Telescopic front fork from 47 to the end and rear suspension as option
- Brakes: drum brakes
- Weight: 305 lb (170 kg) (dry)

The Model 1, more commonly known as Big 4, was a Norton motorcycle made between 1907 and 1954 in various forms. With 633 cc (38.6 cu in), it was the largest and most powerful side-valve engine in the model range and with plenty of low end torque was mostly used to haul sidecars. It was called Big 4 because it was rated at 4 tax horsepower. Mechanically, 'the power output, about which Norton Motors tended to be cagey, was lowly, 14 bhp for 1951'.

Approximately 4700 of the nearly 100,000 military bikes made by Norton during WW2 were Big 4 sidecar outfits. Designed to carry two or three men plus their fighting equipment over very rough terrain, the Big 4 was used for reconnaissance and carrying loads of ammunition to the front line troops.

== Civilian Norton Big 4 ==
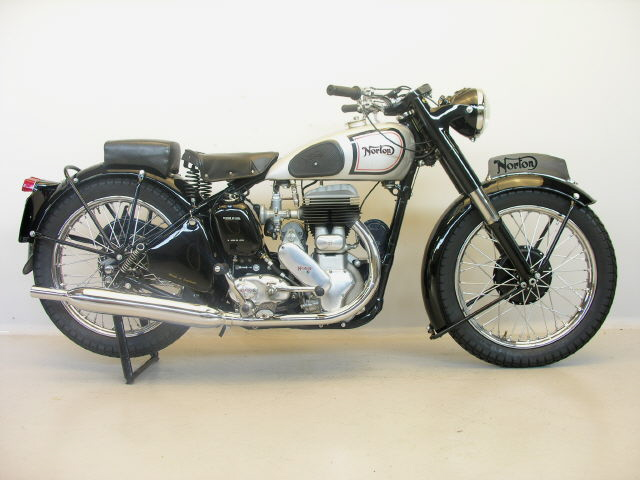
1952 Civilian Norton Big 4

The first Big 4 machines were civilian versions starting in 1907 with a bore and stroke of 82 x 120 mm. The model was produced for nine years after the end of World War II. In 1948 the stroke was reduced to 113 mm to give 596cc capacity. In 1955 Norton ended the manufacture of side-valve singles to concentrate on overhead-valve twins.

== Military Norton WD Big 4 ==
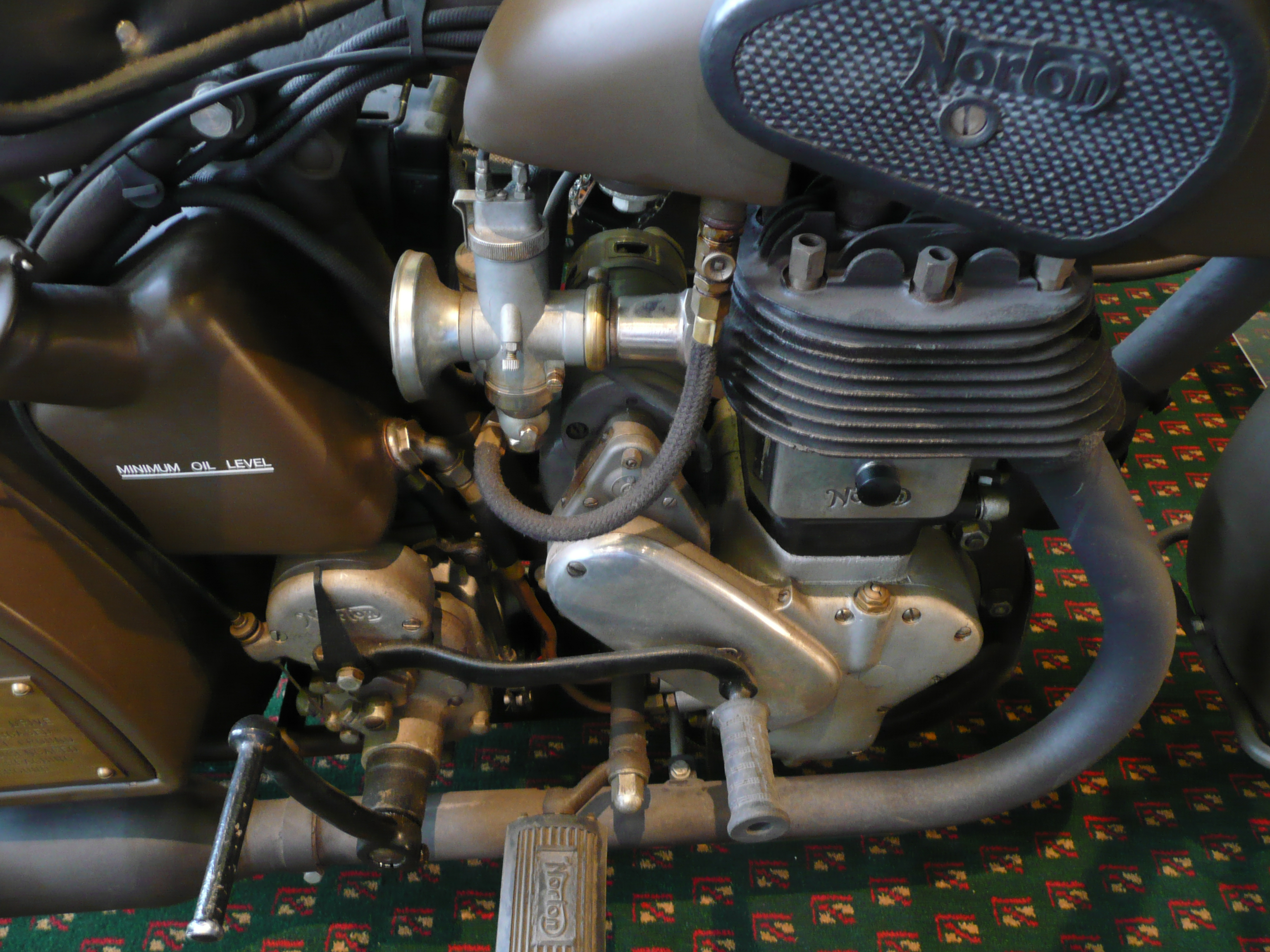
Norton Big Four military outfit (detail)

The WD Big 4 was a development of pre-war trials outfit with a sidecar wheel coupled to the motorcycle rear wheel through a dog clutch and drive shaft. Initial trials were carried out at Studland in Dorset and it coped well with challenging terrain. The simple design also meant it was easy to maintain in the field. All three 18" X 4.00 wheels were interchangeable with various makes of tyres for off-road use.

The sidecar was unarmoured, with thin sheetmetal on the front of the sidecar and there was no sprung suspension in the rear of the heavy duty frame. The sidecar was mounted on four leaf springs, and had two friction disc shock absorbers at the back. The Big Four was eventually replaced by the Ford GP or the Willys Jeep in 1941.

The Big 4 could be equipped with a Bren gun or a 3-inch mortar, bombs could be fitted to a platform in place of a sidecar, but this seems to have been a one-off model, same with the Thompson equipped Big 4.

== See also ==
- List of motorized trikes
- List of motorcycles of 1900 to 1909
