= Norton Model 50 =

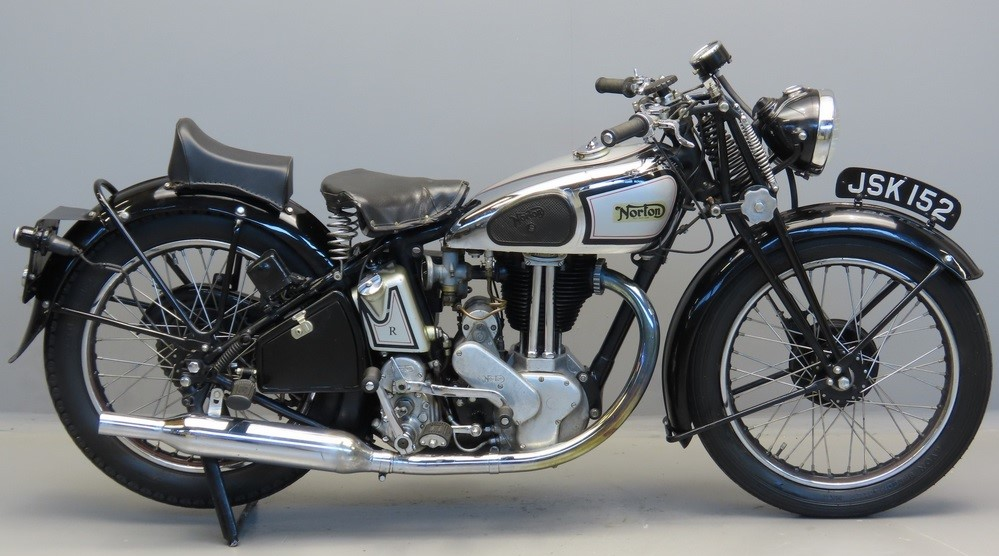
- Norton Model 50 1935
- Manufacturer: Norton Motors Ltd Aston Birmingham
- Parent company: AMC Ltd from 1953
- Production: 1933-1939, 1956-1963
- Engine: 348cc pushrod OHV four-stroke single
- Power: 18 bhp @ 6,000 rpm 1957→
- Transmission: 4-speed to final chain drive
- Weight: 325 pounds (147 kg) (dry)

The Model 50 was a touring motorcycle built by Norton between 1933 and 1963. A further Model 50 was briefly produced by Norton parent-company AMC during 1965 and 1966 using a re-badged Matchless.

Designed by Edgar Franks in 1933, the first run was almost identical to the Norton Model 18 except for the bore and stroke. The single-cylinder engine was 348 cc with pushrod operated overhead valves.

Halted by World War II, production of the Model 50 single restarted in 1956. After 1959 the Model 50 gained the Featherbed frame, Lucas RM15 crank-mounted alternator (upgraded from magneto/dynamo used on 1957–58) coil ignition and improved lighting. In common with other large Nortons, the frame was updated to the 'slimline' version with revised styling in 1961.

When road testing a used example provided by a London dealer in 1964, UK monthly magazine Motorcycle Mechanics reported 75 mph (121 km/h) top speed with 50 to 60 mph (80 to 97 km/h) cruising.

Few survive in original condition as many were converted into 'Tritons' with Triumph engines. Production ended in 1963.
