= Norton ES2 =

Single cylinder motorcycle produced by Norton

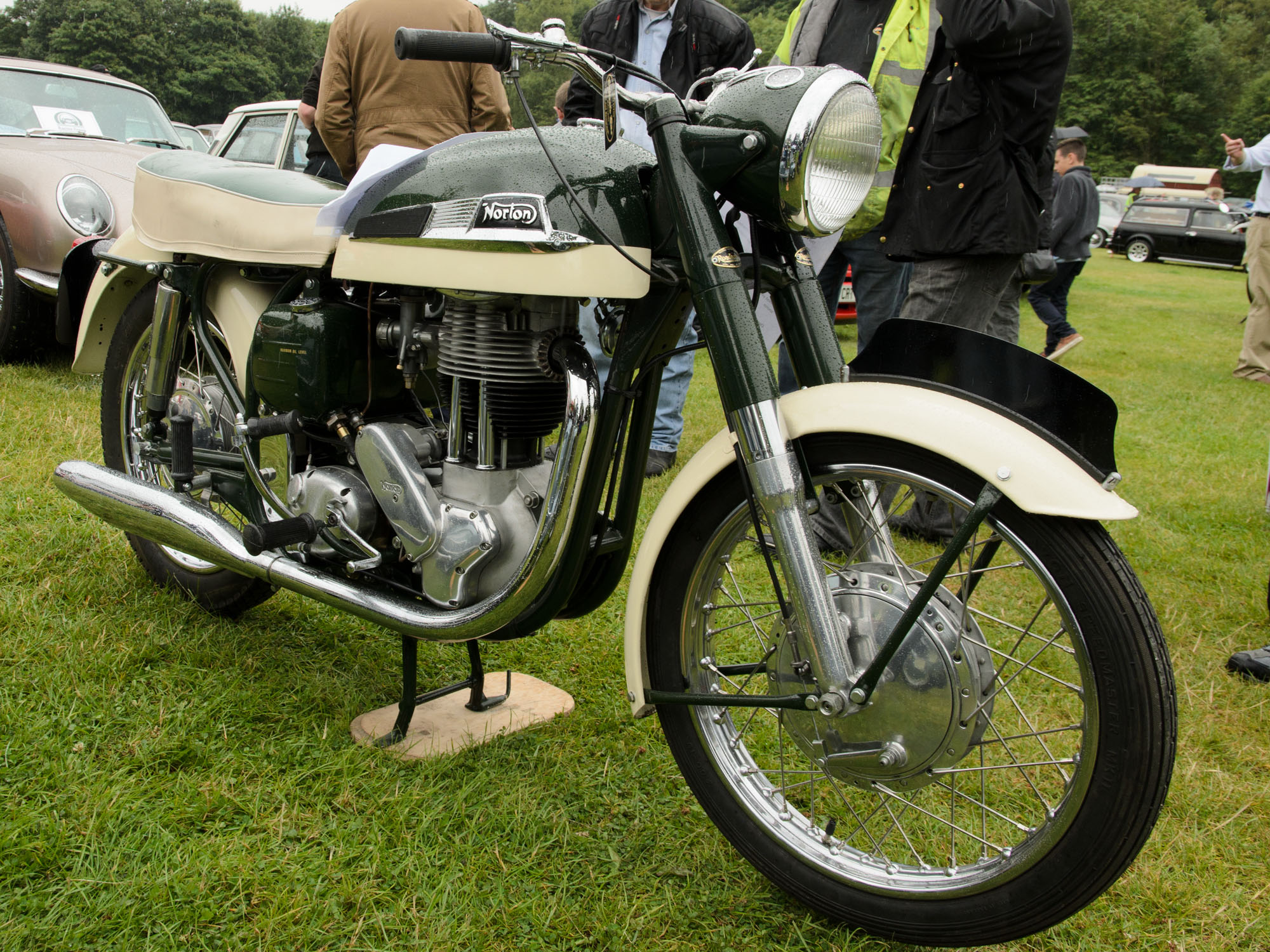
- 1961 slimline featherbed-framed ES2
- Manufacturer: Norton Motors Ltd, Aston, Birmingham
- Parent company: AMC Ltd from 1953
- Production: 1928–64
- Predecessor: Model 18 1922–27
- Successor: Norton ES2 Mk2 (Norton-badged Matchless) 1965–66
- Engine: 490cc OHV air-cooled single
- Top speed: 82 mph
- Power: 1960: 25 bhp @ 5500 rpm
- Transmission: 4-speed gearbox to chain final drive
- Brakes: 1959 onward: 8.00" × 1.25" front, 7.00 × 1.25" rear
- Tires: 1959 onward: 3.00" front, 3.50" rear × 19"
- Wheelbase: 56 inches
- Seat height: 31.5 inches
- Weight: 380 pounds (170 kg) (dry); 392 pounds (178 kg) (wet)
- Fuel capacity: 1947–58: 2.75 Imperial gallons; 1958–63: 3.5 gallons
- Oil capacity: 4 pints
- Fuel consumption: 50 to 60 mpg

The Norton ES2 is a Norton motorcycle produced from 1927 until 1964. From 1965, a different machine was produced for a short time by parent manufacturer AMC, based on a Matchless but badged as Norton ES2 Mk2.

== Development ==
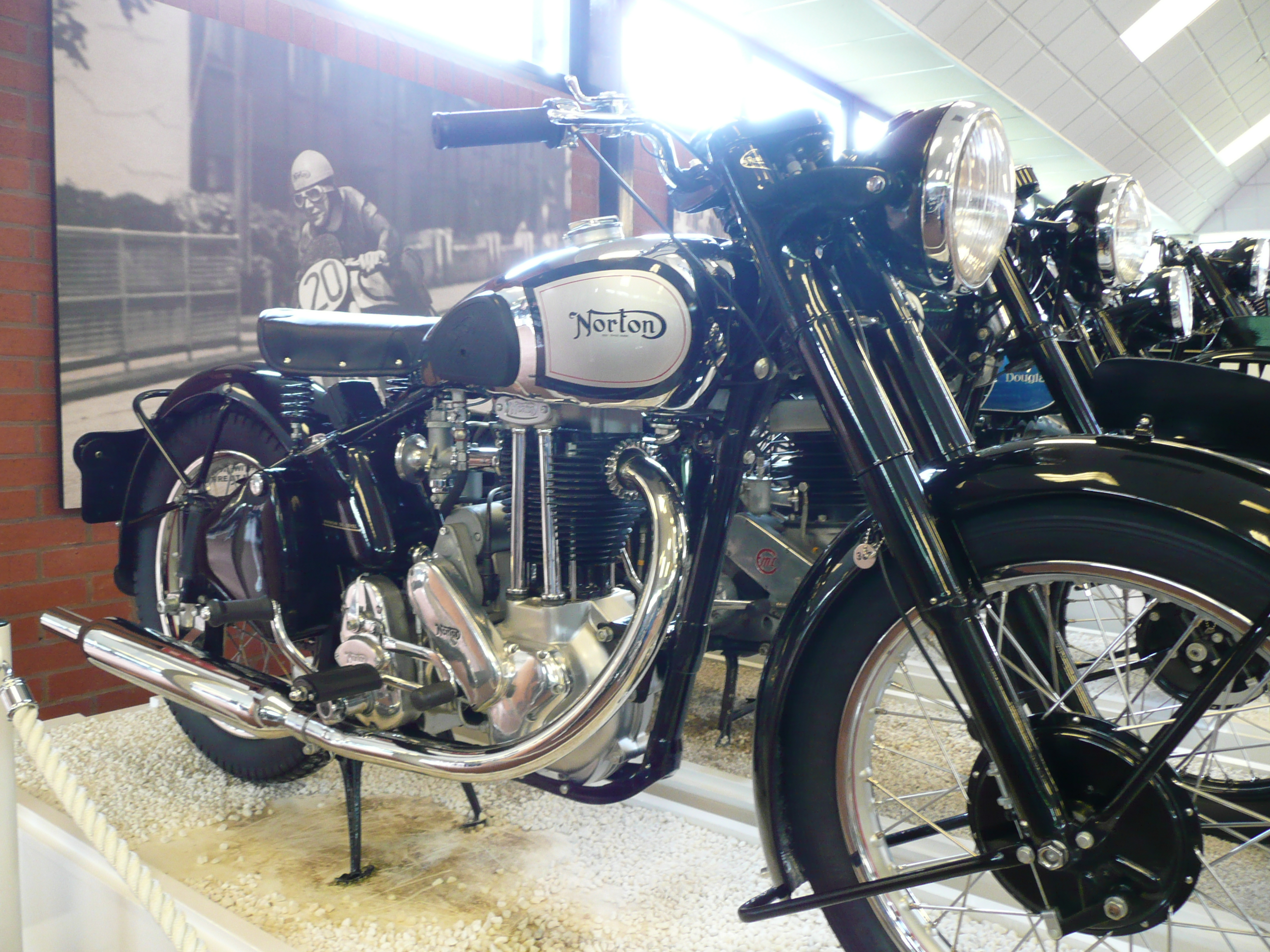
1949 ES2 with telescopic front fork and plunger rear suspension

It was a long-stroke single, always 79mm × 100mm bore and stroke, originally launched as a sports motorcycle but throughout its long life it was gradually overtaken by more powerful models.

It remained popular due to its reliability and ease of maintenance, as well as the traditional design. From 1947 the ES2 had an innovative hydraulically damped telescopic front fork and race developed rear plunger suspension. From 1953 it had a single downtube swinging-arm frame.

== Featherbed frame ==
From 1959 it used the Rex McCandless-designed Featherbed frame, with upgrades including an improved AMC gearbox, revised cylinder head, crankshaft-mounted Lucas RM15 60-watt alternator with coil ignition and an 8-inch front brake with full width hubs front and rear. The wideline Featherbed-framed bike was road tested in The Motor Cycle 4 June 1959 issue and was reported to have a mean top speed of 82 mph with petrol consumption of 56 mpg at 60 mph.

== Slimline Featherbed frame ==
For 1961, in common with other large-engined Nortons, the bike was further improved with the Slimline frame with upper frame rails narrowed and a restyled slimmer fuel tank.

== Finale ==
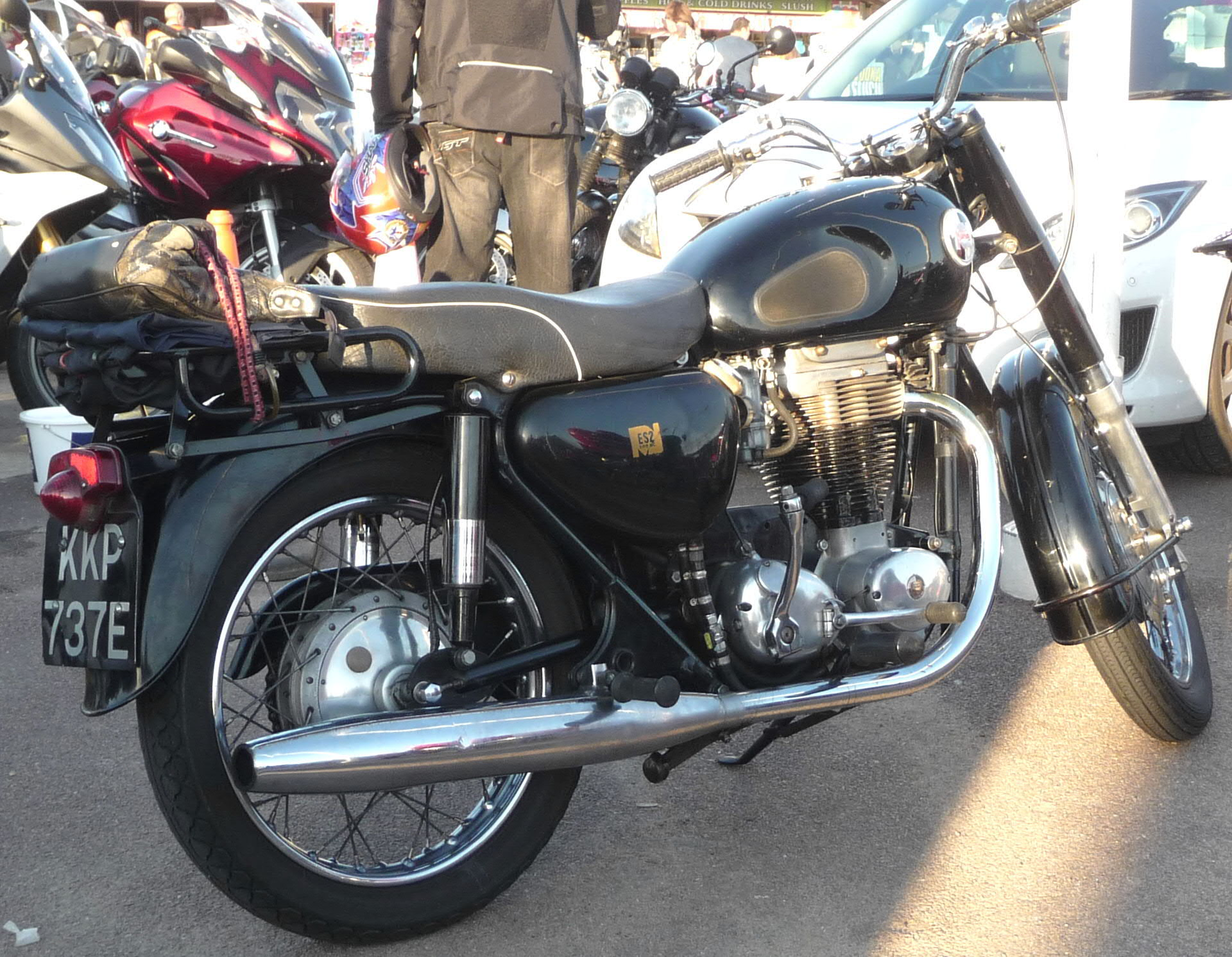
ES2 Mk2 bearing an 'E' suffix (1967) UK registration plate

The last ES2 was introduced in late 1964. A Matchless-based machine with Norton badges, it was produced for two years before final discontinuation, coincident with the commercial failure of the AMC Group.

A report in a 1980 UK magazine stated:

The slow but immensely likeable Featherbed-framed 350 Model 50 and 500 ES2 Norton ohv singles were dropped and in their place appeared the Model 50 MkII and ES2 MkII, or, with Norton badges hastily tacked on the side, the Matchless G3 and G80. They failed to fool anyone, let alone the buying public. In 1966 the heavyweight singles were all but a memory...

== Ernesto "Che" Guevara and The Motorcycle Diaries ==
A 1939 ES2 Norton (christened la poderosa (the mighty one) was famously used by Argentinian medical students Ernesto Guevara (future leader of the Cuban Revolution) and his friend Alberto Granado (future founder of a medical university in Chile) to travel extensively in South America. The epic voyage proved to be a founding experience for Guevara as he gauged the level of poverty and underdevelopment in rural parts of Argentina and Chile and it decided his later political engagement. The hard-strained motorcycle did not last until the end of the voyage (planned to be San Francisco) so it is a replica that is on show in the Che Guevara museum in Alta Gracia in Argentina.

== Bibliography ==
- Bacon, Roy, (1983). Norton singles: Manx and Inter, and all side and overhead valve singles from 1927 to 1966. Oxford: Osprey Publishing. ISBN 978-0850454857
- Williams, P, & Reddihough, JA (1960). Motor Cycle Data Book: Motor Cycles, Scooters, Mopeds, Light Cars. London: George Newnes Ltd.

== See also ==
- Norton Model 50
- List of motorcycles of the 1920s
