= Triumph Trophy (set index) =

Triumph Trophy has been the name of several models of motorcycles produced by Triumph Engineering and its successor, Triumph Motorcycles Ltd.

Image	Name	Displacement	Configuration	Production	Producer
	Triumph Trophy	1215 cc	Three-cylinder	2012–2017	Triumph Motorcycles Ltd, Hinckley, England, (established 1984)
	Triumph Trophy 3	900 cc	Three-cylinder	1993–2003	Triumph Motorcycles Ltd
	Triumph Trophy 4	1200 cc	Four-cylinder	1993–2003	Triumph Motorcycles Ltd
	Triumph TR6 Trophy	650 cc	Parallel-twin	1956–1973	Triumph Engineering Co Ltd, Meriden Works, England (defunct 1983)
	Triumph TR5 Trophy	500 cc	Parallel-twin	1949–1958	Triumph Engineering Co Ltd
	Triumph TR25W Trophy	250 cc	Single-cylinder	1968–1970	Triumph Engineering Co Ltd
