= List of Triumph motorcycles =

Motorcycles produced under the Triumph brand, by both the original company, Triumph Engineering Co Ltd, and its later incarnations, and the current Triumph Motorcycles Ltd.

== Triumph Engineering Co Ltd ==
Known as the Meriden, West Midlands, UK era, 1902–1983.

=== Pre-war ===
Model	Engine displacement [cm^{3}]	Production time	Notes
First model		1902–1904	used Minerva, JAP and Fafnir engines
Second Model		1905	Triumph used their own engine for the first time, 250 were made, 3 hp
Model	474	1908–1909	production up to 3000 in 1909
Model Roadster	500	1910–1913	single speed, optional rear hub clutch as the 'free engine' model
Model C	550	1913–1914	Three speed Sturmey Archer rear wheel hub
Model TT	500	1909–1914	short wheelbase and no pedals. Types, D, F and K
Model H	550	1915–1926	Fitted with a three speed Sturmey Archer gearbox
Model SD	550	1920–1926	The SD(Spring Drive)SV, three speed Triumph gearbox
Model R	500	1921–1926	Designed by Harry Ricardo. OHV with a 4 valve head
Model P	500	1925–1926	made down to the price of £42.17.6
Model N	500	1928	£46
Model X	150 and 175	1930–1934	
Model WO	250	1931-33	Twin Port Sloper (1100 made), OHV
XO	150	1933	OHV
2/1 & 2/L1 (Light Weight)	250	1934–1936	OHV single
6/1	650	1933–1935	Parallel twin. Predates the "Turner Twins". Scrapped when Turner came in, the design later resurfaced, modified, as the BSA A10.
2H, 2H, 3S, 3SC, 3SE, 3H, 5H, 6S,		1937–1940	
Tiger 70	249	1937–1940	OHV single
Tiger 80	349	1937–1940	OHV single
Tiger 90	497	1937–1940	OHV single
5T Speed Twin	498	1937-40,1946–58	parallel twin, OHV
Tiger 100	498	1938-40,1946–59	
2HC	250	1938–1939	C stands for coil ignition

=== Post-war ===
Model	Engine displacement [cm^{3}]	Production time	Notes	
Triumph Grand Prix 500 cc OHV	500	1947–1949	Used an all alloy stationary engine, designed to power military generators during the war.	
TR5 Trophy	500	1949–1958	Competition bike winner of ISDT Trophy for 4 years	
Triumph TRW500	500	1950–1964	Side valve military production motorcycle	
6T Thunderbird	650		twin	
3TA or Triumph Twenty One	350	1957–1966	First 350 cc unit construction machine and debut of the distinctive "bath-tub". Alternator electrical system.	
5TA or Triumph Speed Twin	500	1957–1966	First 500 cc 'unit construction' machine. Alternator electrical system.	
T90	350	1963–1969	"Tiger 90", sports version of the 3TA (still single carburettor). (Note, there'd been an earlier Tiger 90, a 500 cc in 1937).	
T100	500	1959	Sports version of the 5T "Speed Twin"	
T100A		1960–1961	Sports version of the 5TA, first Tiger with 'unit construction', 'bathtub' rear enclosure	
T100SS		1962–1968?	Sports version of the 5TA	
T100S Tiger Sports				
T100SR	500	1963–1966	'Sports Road', Sherbourne Green over Alaskan White paint, white hand grips.	
T100S Tiger Sports				
T100P	500	1967?–1973	Police version of the unit construction T100. A 1973 T100P was ridden around the world by Ted Simon, documented in his book "Jupiter's Travels".	
T100R Daytona	500	1966–1974	Road version of the racing twin. Built as an answer to Honda's 444 cc Black Bomber. Tested at 110+mph, topped 150 in race trim.	
T110 Tiger	650		Sports model capable of 110 mph	
TR5T Adventurer/Trophy Trail	500	1972–1974	On/off-road style	
TR25W Trophy 250	250	1968–1970	Single-cylinder engine based on the BSA B25 Starfire (not the Tiger Cub. The starfire/C15 was a development of the Tiger cub engine.).	
T100C Trophy	500	1966–1972	single carb. Mainly for export to the USA	
TR6 Trophy	650	1956–1968	Single carburetor model.	
TR6C Trophy	650		C is the 'Competition' Model. High pipes on left side. Frequently referred to as desert sleds when used for racing in the Western US. Lower overall gear ratios.	
TR6P Saint	650	1967–1973	Police version of the unit construction Trophy. Named the "Saint", an acronym for "Stop Anything In No Time".	
TR6R Tiger	650	1969-72	R is "Road" Model. Trophy renamed Tiger for the 650cc single carb as distinguished from the twin carb of the Bonneville (TR120) 650cc.	500cc Tiger single carb renamed Trophy.
TR7V Tiger	750	thru78	Almost identical to the T140; differentiated by the Tiger having a single (as opposed to twin) carburettor. Other differences being cosmetic. "V" identifies 5 speed gearbox.	
Terrier	150	1953–1956	Triumph's first unit-construction engine.	
Tiger Cub	200	1954–1968	Single-cylinder based on the Terrier.	
T120 Bonneville	650		Descended directly from the Tiger 110. Twin Carburettor.	
Thruxton Bonneville		Built May 1965	Production racer (52 total machines built)	
T140 Bonneville	750	1973–1983	Produced at the Meriden factory and after its closure, for a short time in Devon.	
Tina Scooter (later T 10)	100	1962–1970	Re-designated "T10" in 1965.	
Tigress Scooter	175 (2-stroke) / 250 (4-stroke)	1959–1965		
T140W TSS	750		8-valve head	
T140D Bonneville Special	750		Custom style	
T140E	750		Emissions-controlled	
Triumph T140 TSX			Custom style	
TS8-1			Show prototype anti-vibration 8 valve	
Bonneville Executive			faired tourer with luggage	
Triumph TR65 Thunderbird	650		T140 derivative, 76x71.5 giving 649 short stroke engine	
TR7T Tiger Trail	750		On/off-road style	
TR65T Tiger Trail	650		On/off-road style with TR65 engine	
T140LE Royal Wedding Bonneville	750	1981	250 of these to commemorate the Prince of Wales' marriage	
T140J Bonneville Silver Jubilee	750	1977	2500 of these commemorated Elizabeth II of the United Kingdom's Silver Jubilee	
T140AV, TR7AV, TSSAV			Anti-Vibration police models	
TR7VS Tiger Electro			Electric start	
T140ES Bonneville Electro			Electric start	
TR6 Thunderbird	600		Show prototype custom style	
Daytona 600	600		Show prototype	
TSX8			Show prototype 8-valve custom style	
Tiger 1200	1160	2012		
Tiger 1200 Rally	1160	2022	On/off-road style	
Tiger 1200 Rally Pro	1160	2023	On/off-road style. Fuel tank 20 litres	
Tiger 1200 Rally Explorer	1160	2023	On/off-road style. Fuel tank 30 litres	

=== Triples ===
For full detail see BSA Rocket 3/Triumph Trident (for corresponding BSA models see BSA Triples)

Model	First year	Last year	Notes
T150	1969	1972	
T150V	1971	1974	5-speed gearbox
X75 Hurricane	1973		The first production 'Custom' motorcycle–styled by Craig Vetter
T160	1975		

=== From 1985 to 1988 ===
- Triumph Bonneville

== Triumph Motorcycles Limited ==
Known as the Hinckley, Leicestershire era, 1990–.

Model	Engine displacement [cm^{3}]	Years	Notes
Daytona 750	748	1990–1992	Triple with short-stroke crank fitted (900 has the long-throw crank). Aimed at Super sports market but more of a sports-tourer. Only circa 240 made. These are now very collectable.
Daytona 1000	998	1990–1992	Sports bike using four-cylinder version of the short-stroke 750 Daytona/Trident engine
Trophy 900	885	1990–2002	From 1995 it received a completely new (and much larger) fairing, designed by John Mockett, standard fit panniers and a new exhaust system with low slung silencers to allow the panniers to fit.
Trophy 1200	1180	1990–2004	Initially 141 bhp sports tourer, using 4-cylinder long-stroke version of modular engine. From 1995 it received a completely new (and much larger) fairing, designed by John Mockett, standard fit panniers and a new exhaust system with low slung silencers to allow the panniers to fit. Engine retuned to 108 bhp with improved torque.
Trophy SE	1215	2013-2017	Full touring motorcycle, sharing its all-new (and shaft-driven) 1215 triple with the (Adventure styled) Tiger Explorer. Initially sold as a "basic" Trophy and an "SE" (the "basic" version was never available in the US), only the SE is currently listed.
Trident 750	748		Naked version of short-stroke triple-engined bike.
Trident 900	885		Naked version of long-stroke triple-engined bike.
Trident Sprint 900	885		Standard Trident, fitted with very effective twin headlamp half fairing.
Sprint 900	885		As above but, as model became well known in its own right, Triumph decided to drop the "Trident" part of the name. Facelifted in 1995 to include new (unique to the Sprint, at the time) side panels and tail light.
Sprint 900 Sport	885		Sprint with improved suspension, higher pegs and exhausts (all taken from the, then current, speed triple) and lower bars (taken from the early Trophy). Probably the best mix of all parts from the initial modular range of Hinckley Triumphs.
Sprint 900 Executive	885		Sprint with panniers, exhausts and footrest hangers taken from the post 1995 Triumph Trophy.
Daytona 900	885	1992–1997	A combination of the original 750 Daytona with the long stroke 900 engine and a slightly more acceptable riding position. Still too heavy and large to be a true sports bike, but a very charismatic and robust high speed, long distance, tourer.
Daytona Super 3	885	1994–1996	A standard 900 Daytona with a Cosworth modified engine producing claimed 115 bhp, fitted with a few carbon fibre extras. The Daytona on which it was based was never a true sports bike, being too heavy (especially top heavy) and unwieldy to compete with current sports bikes. The Super III was an attempt to shed weight and increase power, but combined with a very high price, only served to underline that this was a step too far for the original modular design. These have become collectible bikes.
Daytona 1200	1180	1992–1999	147 bhp 4 cyl Sports Tourer. Though discontinued in '96, it was relaunched as a "Special Edition" in '98. Only 250 individually numbered machines were produced (the number being shown on a specially engraved plaque on the headstock). It featured with 6 pot brakes (from the Super III), black paint with gold lettering and gold wheels. One of the special plaques was damaged in production and, when another one was ordered, it came as "number 251" in error.
Thunderbird 900	885	1995–2004	Triumph's first attempt to revive a classic-styled motorcycle based on its heritage, using the original modular platform. Bike sported 18" front tire and 16" rear, detuned the 885 motor to 70 hp with better lower-end torque.5-speed until engine number 71843, then all fitted with 6-speed.
Adventurer 900	885	1996–2000	Thunderbird with wider 19" front tyre, plus bob-tail rear fender similar to cruiser bike. Triumph's first attempt at a cruiser, using the modular platform. All from engine number 71843 are 6 speed.
Thunderbird Sport 900	885	1997–2000, 2003–2004	Thunderbird with wider 17" tyres, plus "arguably" uprated engine (the only real visual difference is with the exhaust system), however the suspension and brakes are improved with twin disc set up. All 6-speed and 82 bhp.
Daytona T595	955	1997–1999	The first true sports bike from the new Hinckley Triumph. Using an engine only very loosely based on the long stroke triple motor, it was much lighter, more powerful and used a unique alloy perimeter frame allowing the low centre of gravity and dedicated sports bike handling necessary to compete in this market. It also had an alloy single sided swing arm that was very similar to that offered by Ducati in their then current 916. The first production bikes featured a polished alloy frame, but these examples very quickly picked up a reputation for catastrophic weld failure on the top rail leading to the headstock. The frames were soon modified with a much larger weld on the top tube, though they were never supplied polished again, reverting to a silver/grey paint finish.
Daytona 955i	955	1999–2006	The T595 was renamed 955 as it was too often thought to be a 600 cc bike! It gradually evolved with a new bodywork and improved engine mapping. It lost the single sided swinging arm at one point, but then reverted to a single sided arm around a year later. Model eventually discontinued and never replaced as factory felt that the high level of investment necessary to stay competitive in the large sports bike market wasn't justified. Also "CE" (Centennial Edition) version 2002
Daytona 600	599	2002–2004	
Daytona 650	646	2005–2006	Longer stroke version of Daytona 600
Daytona 675	675	2006-2016	All new bike with all new three cylinder engine
Daytona 765	765	2020	Limited production (1530 total), based on the Street Triple 765, plus tweaks from Triumph's Moto2 learnings.
TT 600	599	2000–2002	
Scrambler 900	865	2006–	Street–scrambler styled trail bike, based on the 865 cc Bonneville, 270° crank, high level exhaust system. Electronic Fuel Injection from 2008MY(UK) 2009MY(ROW)
Thruxton 900	865	2004–	Bonneville based cafe racer
Sprint RS	955	1999–2004	
Sprint ST	955/1050	1999 on	1999–2005 955 cc, 2005 on 1050 cc
Sprint GT	1050	2010 on	Liquid-cooled, 12 valve, DOHC, in-line 3-cylinder producing 128 bhp/96 kW @ 9200rpm and torque 108Nm/80 ft.lbs @ 6300rpm. ABS Standard. Available in Pacific Blue, Aluminium Silver and Phantom Black.
Legend TT	885	1998–2000	
Speedmaster	790	2003–2004	Cruiser based on the Bonneville, the engine being at 270° instead of 360°
Speedmaster 900	865	2005-	Cruiser based on the Bonneville T100, the engine being at 270° instead of 360°
Adventurer	885	1996–2001	Restyled Thunderbird 900
Triumph Bonneville America	790/865	2002 on	2002–2006 790 cc, 2007 on 865 cc. 2008 on fuel injected
Rocket III	2294	2004-2009	Long-distance touring Cruiser
Rocket III Classic	2294	2006-2007	Rider floorboards, different mufflers, 'pullback' handlebars, more comfortable passenger seat
Rocket III Tourer	2294	2007-2007	Classic Model with windscreen, soft saddlebags, backrest, luggage rack and a choice of two-tone paint schemes
Rocket III Touring	2294	2008-2017	Hard luggage and large windscreen standard equipment, less bhp, more torque than standard model
Rocket III Roadster	2294	2010-2018	more HP & torque than standard model, mechanical improvements, modified rider positioning
Rocket 3 Triumph Factory Custom	2458	2019-2019	Redesign - more HP & torque than previous 2300cc model, limited to 750 units
Rocket 3	2458	2020	Redesign - more HP & torque than previous 2300cc model, R & GT variants
Bonneville 790	790/865	2001-2007 790 cc, 2007 on 865 cc	After 10 years of producing bikes around a modern engine, Triumph eventually succumbed to the need to build a true modern version of the classic Bonneville. Using a counterbalanced air and oil cooled parallel twin motor, it looked as close to the original '60's version of the unit construction Bonneville as it was possible to within current noise and emission regulations. In 2002 Triumph released a limited-edition model to commemorate the 50th anniversary of Queen Elizabeth's coronation. These collectable bikes were dubbed the "Golden Jubilee" and featured an exclusive paint scheme and badging.
Bonneville Bobber	1200	2017-	The Bonneville Bobber is a new Bonneville model introduced for the 2017 model year. It is a slightly modified version of the same 1200 cc engine introduced in the Bonneville T120 in 2016 which gives it a little less power but more torque.
Bonneville T100	790/865/900	2002 on	2002-2005 790 cc, 2006 on 865 cc, 2008 fuel injection replaced carbs, 2017 900 cc Liquid cooled, 8 valve, SOHC, 270° parallel twin
Bonneville T120	1200	2016-	Brought back for 2016 an all new 1200 cc Liquid cooled, 8 valve, SOHC, 270° parallel twin
Triumph Speed Twin 1200	1200	2019-	The Triumph Speed Twin 1200 is a standard motorcycle made by Triumph Motorcycles Ltd that is a modern successor of the original Triumph Speed Twin from 1938
Speed Triple 750	748		Budget Speed Triple using 750 Trident engine, only in production for a very short time. Using identical components to the 900 version, the only way to tell this model apart is the larger (18") diameter rear wheel, with 6 spokes rather than 3.
Speed Triple 900	885	1994–1997	Triumph's very successful attempt at a streetfighter motorcycle, similar to how owners were "stripping down" modern sport bikes. Essentially a Daytona 900 without a fairing and fitted with a single round headlamp and conventional paired instrument pod. Originally (and pointlessly) sold with just a 5 speed gearbox, but later versions had the same 6 ratios as the 900 Daytona. Wildly successful and included its own racing series. Still top heavy and not a true sports bike, but one of the most charismatic bikes of the decade. Nearly always sold in all black, with orange being rare and yellow extremely rare.
Speed Triple T509	885	1997–1999	Replacing the original 900 Speed Triple using, logically, the frame, motor (though originally in 885 cc, rather than 955 cc, guise) and much of the running gear from the new T595 sports bike. Again, there was no fairing, although this time it had twin headlamps in chrome pods to follow the "Street fighter" line, rather than the earlier "cafe racer" appearance. Much lighter and easier to handle than the earlier 900 Speed Triple it was equally successful, though the appearance of the new engine was probably better suited to being hidden behind a fairing.
Speed Triple 955i	955	1999–2005	
Speed Triple 1050	1050	2005-2020	
Speed Triple 1200	1160	2021 on	All-new design inspired by Moto2 and Street Triple 765
Street Triple 675	675	2008-2016	Scaled down Speed Triple, based on Daytona 675 Chassis
Street Triple 765	765	2017 on	
Speed Four	599	2002-2005	Stripped down TT600 with reworked engine
Tiger 900	885	1993–1998	Dual sport with desert racer styling
Tiger 900i	885	1999–2001	Revamped model with fuel-injected motor based on T509 Speed Triple
Tiger 955i	955	2001–2006	Increased displacement to 955cc, gradual changes made until end of production in 2006
Tiger 1050	1050	2007 on	
Tiger 800	800	2011 on	All-new smaller Tiger with an engine based in part on the existing 675cc motor used in the Daytona 675 and Street Triple; was available in several road- and off-road-orientated versions
Tiger 900	888	2020 on	Successor of the Tiger 800
Triumph Thunderbird	1,600 and 1,700	2009	85 bhp(1600) 97 bhp (1700) bhp Parallel Twin, belt-drive cruiser
Triumph Trident 660	660	2020 on	660cc 80 bhp tricylinder evolved from Street Triple 660. Adapted to Euro5
Triumph Tiger Sport 660	660	2022 on	660cc 80 bhp tricylinder evolved from Tiger 1200 . Adapted to Euro5
