= Triumph Tiger T110 =

British motorcycle

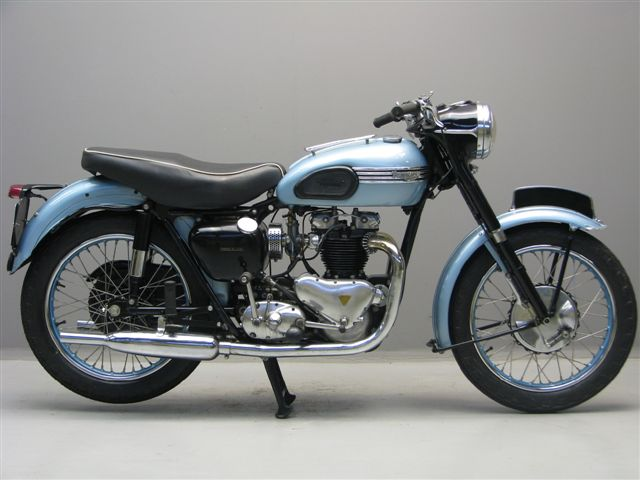
- Manufacturer: Triumph
- Production: 1953–1961
- Engine: 649 cc parallel twin OHV four-stroke
- Transmission: 4 speed / chain
- Wheelbase: 57 inches (140 cm)
- Seat height: 31 inches (79 cm)
- Weight: 420 lb (190 kg) (dry)
- Fuel capacity: 4 imp gal (18 L; 4.8 US gal)
- Fuel consumption: 70 mpg_{‑imp} (4.0 L/100 km; 58 mpg_{‑US}) at 60 mph (97 km/h)

The Triumph Tiger 110 is a British sports motorcycle that Triumph first made at their Coventry factory between 1953 and 1961. The T110 was developed from the Triumph Thunderbird and first appeared in 1954.

Although it was supposed to be the sports model of the Triumph range, the Tiger 110 was later fitted with the rear paneling that was introduced with Triumph's 350cc 3TA twin in 1957. This rear cowling earned it the nickname 'bathtub' from its shape and made the T110 look somewhat staid. From 1959 the T120 Bonneville became Triumph's leading sports model, and before the introduction of the unit construction 650cc twin in 1962, the T110 was dropped from Triumph's range.

== Development ==
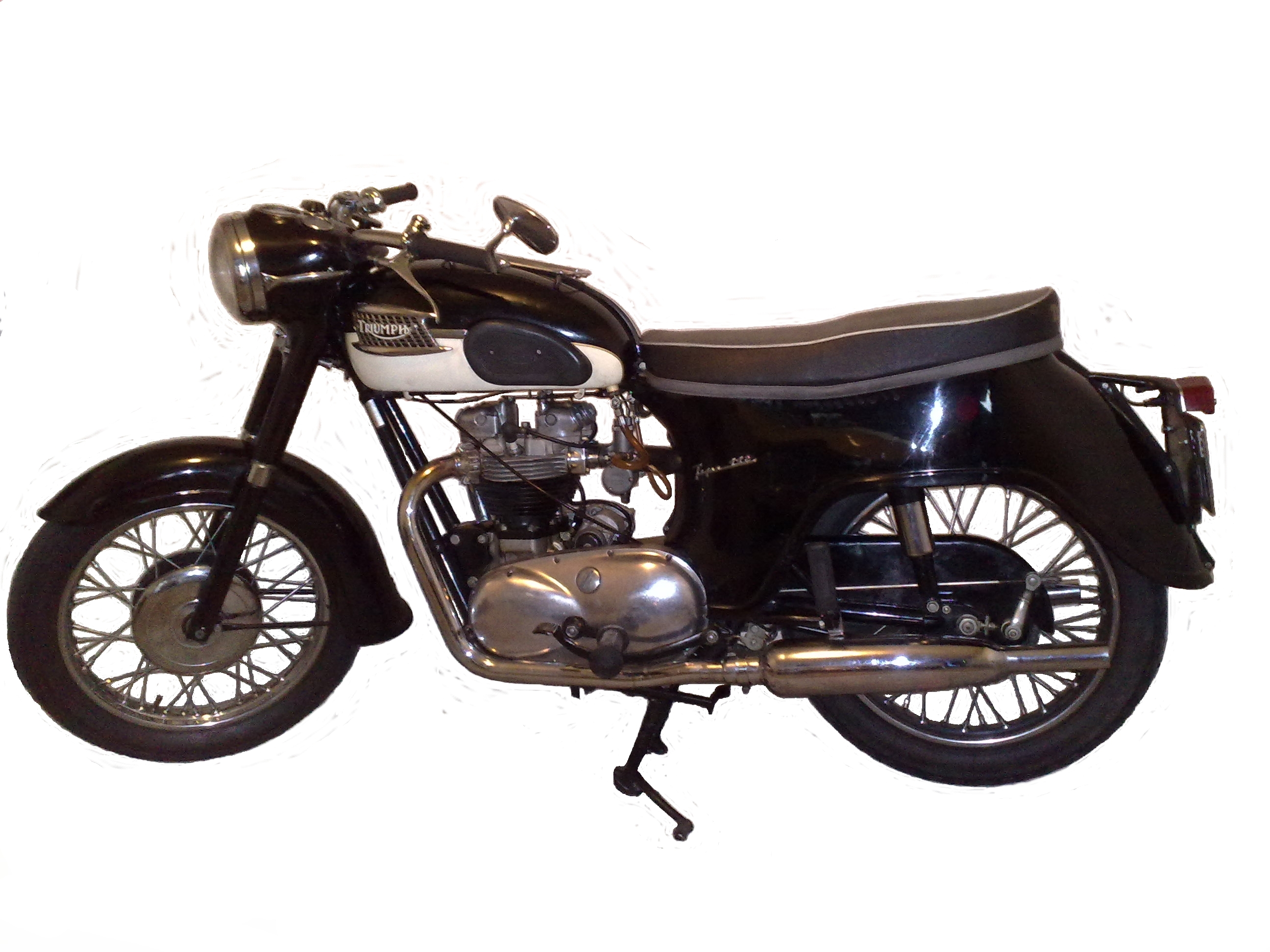
1961 Triumph T110 with rear 'bathtub' fairing

The Triumph Tiger 110 650 cc OHV Twin was developed for the American market, and was Triumph's fastest production motorcycle to date. The T110 was built in 1953 and introduced as a 1954 model. The originally cast iron cylinder block and head soon were replaced with a light alloy cylinder head with special airways to improve cooling and austenitic iron valve seat inserts. The external oil feed pipes were also replaced with internal oilways via the pushrod tubes.

The Triumph Tiger 100 was named because it was capable of 100 mph (160 km/h). The best one way speed obtained with the Tiger 110 by The Motor Cycle magazine was 109 mph (175 km/h) – although the speedometer read 114 mph (183 km/h).

By 1959, the Tiger 110 was eclipsed by the dual carburettor Bonneville T120 as Triumph's fastest model. The Tiger 110 then received the enclosed panels of the Twenty One which, resembling an upside-down Victorian slipper bathtub, earned the bike the nickname 'bathtub'.

== World Speed Record ==
On 6 September 1956, at Bonneville Salt Flats American racer Johnny Allen secured the motorcycle land-speed record on a heavily modified Triumph T110 with a top speed of 214.17 mph (344.67 km/h). This success led to the development of the Tiger T110's successor - the Triumph Bonneville.

== See also ==
- List of motorcycles of the 1950s
- List of Triumph motorcycles
