= Nacelle =

Part of an aircraft, encasing the engines

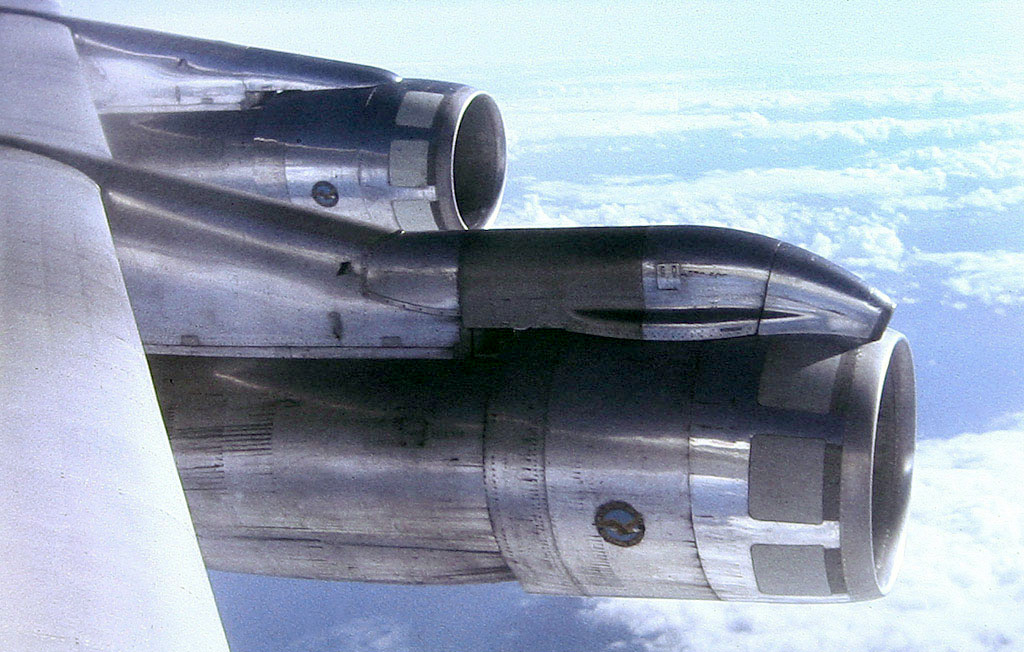
Engines in nacelles on a Boeing 707

A nacelle (/nəˈsɛl/ nə-SEL) is a streamlined container for aircraft parts such as engines, fuel or equipment. When attached entirely outside the airframe, it is sometimes called a pod, in which case it is attached with a pylon or strut and the engine is known as a podded engine. In some cases—for instance in the typical "Farman" type "pusher" aircraft, or the World War II-era P-38 Lightning or SAAB J21—an aircraft cockpit may also be housed in a nacelle, rather than in a conventional fuselage.

== Etymology ==
Like many aviation terms, the word comes from French, in this case from a word for a small boat.

== Development ==
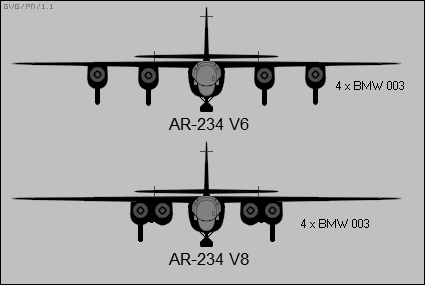
The development of the Arado Ar 234, merging the four nacelles into two

The Arado Ar 234 was one of the first operational jet aircraft with engines mounted in nacelles. During its development, the four engines had four distinct nacelles. They once had their own landing gear wheel, but they were later combined to two nacelles with two engines each.

A visible feature on airliner nacelles is the chevron nozzle, a fan air/exhaust gas mixer for jet noise reduction.

== Applications ==
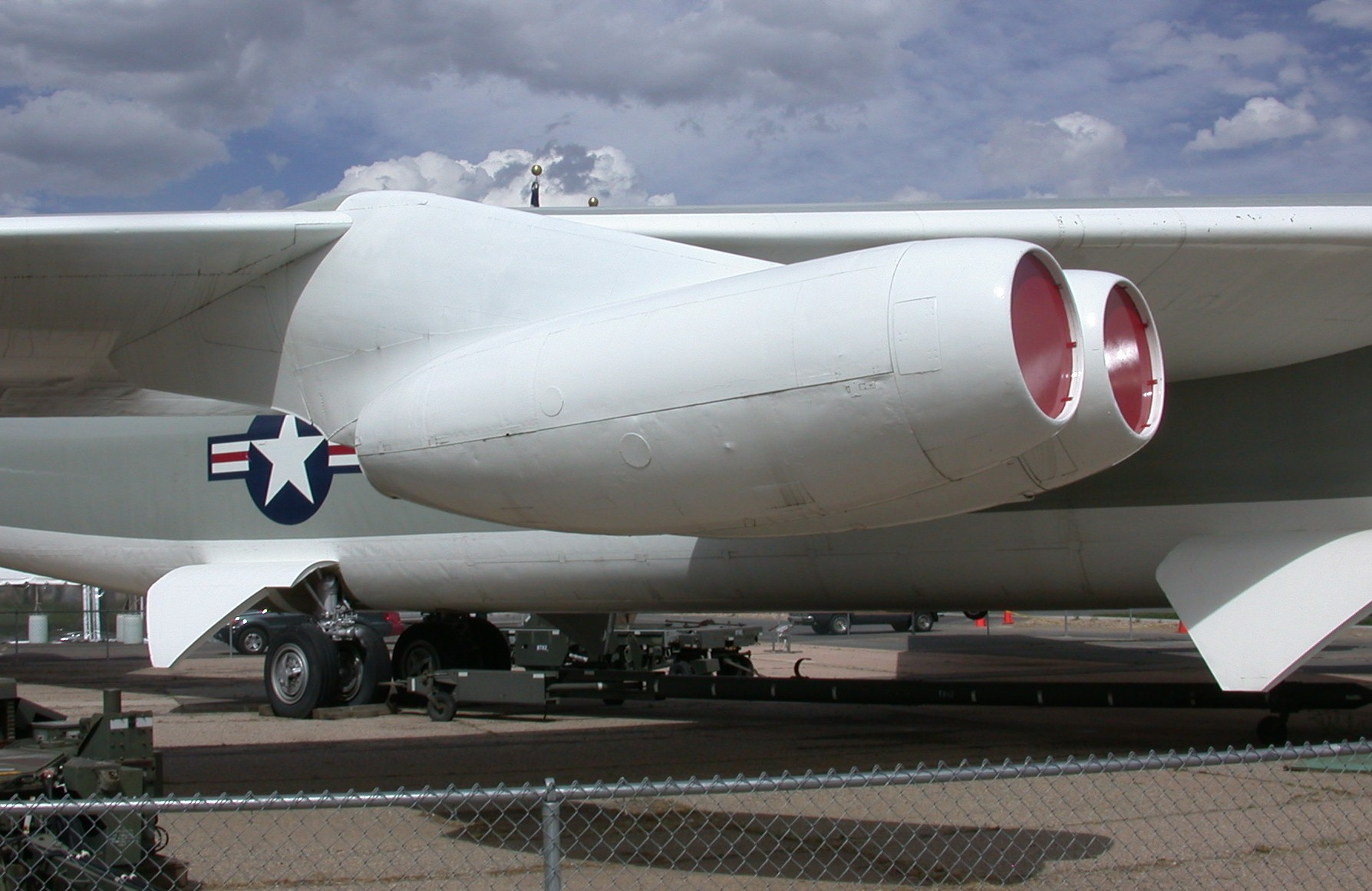
Twin-engine nacelle on a B-52 Stratofortress

=== Multi-engined aircraft ===
Airliners install their engines in nacelles under the wing or on the sides of the rear fuselage.

Engines may be mounted in individual nacelles, or in the case of larger aircraft such as the Boeing B-52 Stratofortress (pictured right) may have two engines mounted in a single nacelle.

=== Other uses ===
- The generator and gearbox "shell" – with rotator shaft – on a horizontal-axis wind turbine (HAWT).
- Edward Turner used the term to describe his styling device introduced in 1949 to tidy the area around the headlamp and instrument panel of his Triumph Speed Twin, Thunderbird and Tiger 100 motorcycles. This styling device was much copied within the British industry thereafter, although Czech motorcycle manufacturer Česká Zbrojovka Strakonice was using it beforehand. Indeed, the Royal Enfield Bullet still retains its version, the 'casquette', on its current models. The last Triumphs to sport nacelles were the 1966 models of the 6T Triumph Thunderbird 650, 5TA Triumph Speed Twin 500, and 3TA Triumph Twenty One 350.
- Harley-Davidson refers to the streamlined headlamp and fork triple tree covering on the Milwaukee-Eight version of the Harley-Davidson Fat Boy as the "Headlamp Nacelle." The replacement kit also refers to it as the "Fat Boy Nacelle Kit".
- A forward projection of a catamaran's bridgedeck designed to soften the impact of seas or make more space inside the cabin.
- In the Star Trek franchise it is also used as a term for the housing containing coils that generate the warp field. This is separate to the engine that powers them.

== Design considerations ==
The primary design issue with aircraft-mounted nacelles is streamlining to minimise drag so nacelles are mounted on slender pylons. This can cause issues with directing the needed conduits mounted within the nacelle to connect to the aircraft through such a narrow space. This is especially concerning with nacelles containing engines, as the fuel lines and control for multiple engine functions must all go through the pylons. It is often necessary for nacelles to be asymmetrical, but aircraft designers try to keep asymmetrical elements to a minimum to reduce operator maintenance costs associated with having two sets of parts for either side of the aircraft.
