= Triumph Bonneville T120 1200 =

British motorcycle

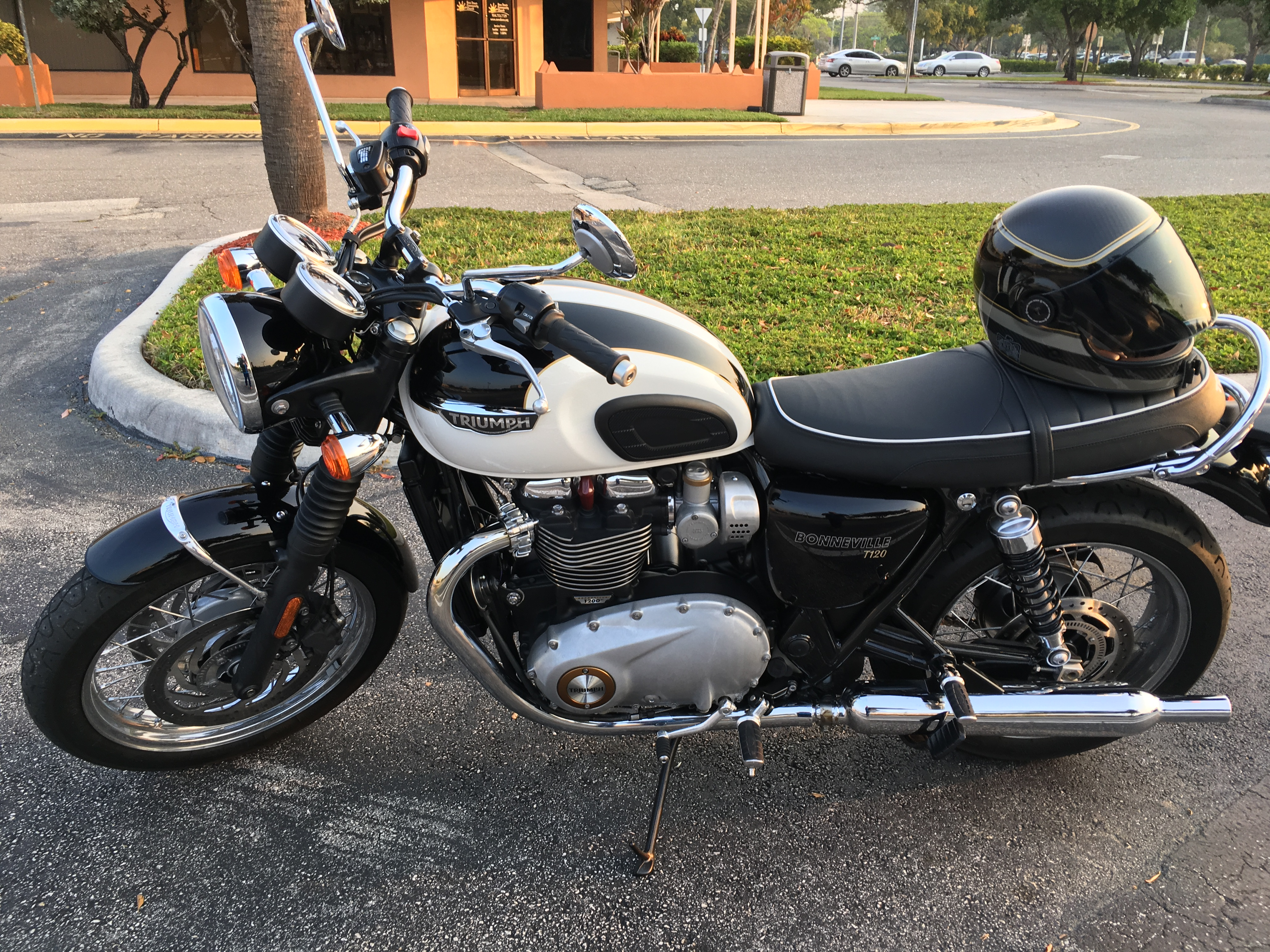
- 2017 Bonneville T120 1200
- Manufacturer: Triumph Motorcycles Ltd
- Production: 2016—
- Engine: 1,200 cc (73 cu in) liquid-cooled, SOHC, 270° crank angle parallel-twin
- Power: 72 bhp (54 kW) @ 6,330 rpm (rear wheel) 2016
- Torque: 72 lb⋅ft (98 N⋅m) @ 3,280 rpm(rear wheel) 2016

The Triumph Bonneville T120 1200 is a British motorcycle designed and built in Hinckley, Leicestershire by Triumph Motorcycles Ltd.

== See also ==
- List of Triumph motorcycles
