= Triumph Speed Twin 1200 =

Triumph Speed Twin
- Manufacturer: Triumph Motorcycles Ltd
- Production: 2019-present
- Assembly: Hinckley, Leicestershire.
- Class: Standard
- Engine: 1,200 cc (73 cu in) water-cooled single overhead camshaft parallel twin cylinder
- Bore / stroke: 97.6 mm × 80.0 mm (3.84 in × 3.15 in)
- Compression ratio: 11:1
- Power: 72 kW (97 hp) @ 6,750 rpm
- Torque: 112 N⋅m (83 lbf⋅ft) @ 4,950 rpm
- Transmission: Wet multi-plate assist clutch, six-speed manual, X-ring chain.
- Frame type: Tubular steel with aluminium cradle
- Suspension: Front: 41 mm (1.6 in) KYB cartridge front forks. 120 mm (4.7 in) travel. Rear: Twin KYB shocks with preload adjuster, 120 mm (4.7 in) rear wheel travel.
- Brakes: Front: Dual 305 mm (12.0 in) discs, Brembo 4-piston fixed calipers, ABS. Rear: Single 220 mm (8.7 in) disc, Nissin 2-piston floating caliper, ABS.
- Tires: Front: 120/70 ZR17; Rear: 160/60 ZR17
- Rake, trail: 22.8°, 93.5 mm (3.68 in).
- Wheelbase: 1,430 mm (56 in)
- Dimensions: W: 760 mm (30 in). H: 1,110 mm (44 in).
- Seat height: 807 mm (31.8 in).
- Weight: 196 kg (432 lb). (dry)
- Fuel capacity: 14.5 L (3.2 imp gal; 3.8 US gal)

The Triumph Speed Twin 1200 is a standard motorcycle made by Triumph Motorcycles Ltd that is a modern successor of the original Triumph Speed Twin from 1938. Part of the Triumph Bonneville range, this 1200cc bike was designed to slot in between the 900cc Triumph Street Twin (now renamed the Speed Twin 900) and the heavier 1200cc Triumph Thruxton.

For 2021 and Euro5, it received a mild refresh including higher spec Brembo front brakes, upside down Marzocchi front forks, slightly more peak power and a 500 rpm rev limiter increase, plus small cosmetic tweaks visually.

== See also ==
- Triumph Speed Twin 900
