= TR6 =

TR6 may refer to:

- TR6, an English postcode for Perranporth, Bolingey, Perrancoombe
- Triumph TR6, a sports car that was built by the Triumph Motor Company of England
- Triumph TR6 Trophy, a motorcycle that was made by Triumph
- Tomb Raider: Angel of Darkness, the sixth and last game of the original Tomb Raider series
