= Triumph TR5 Trophy =

British motorcycle

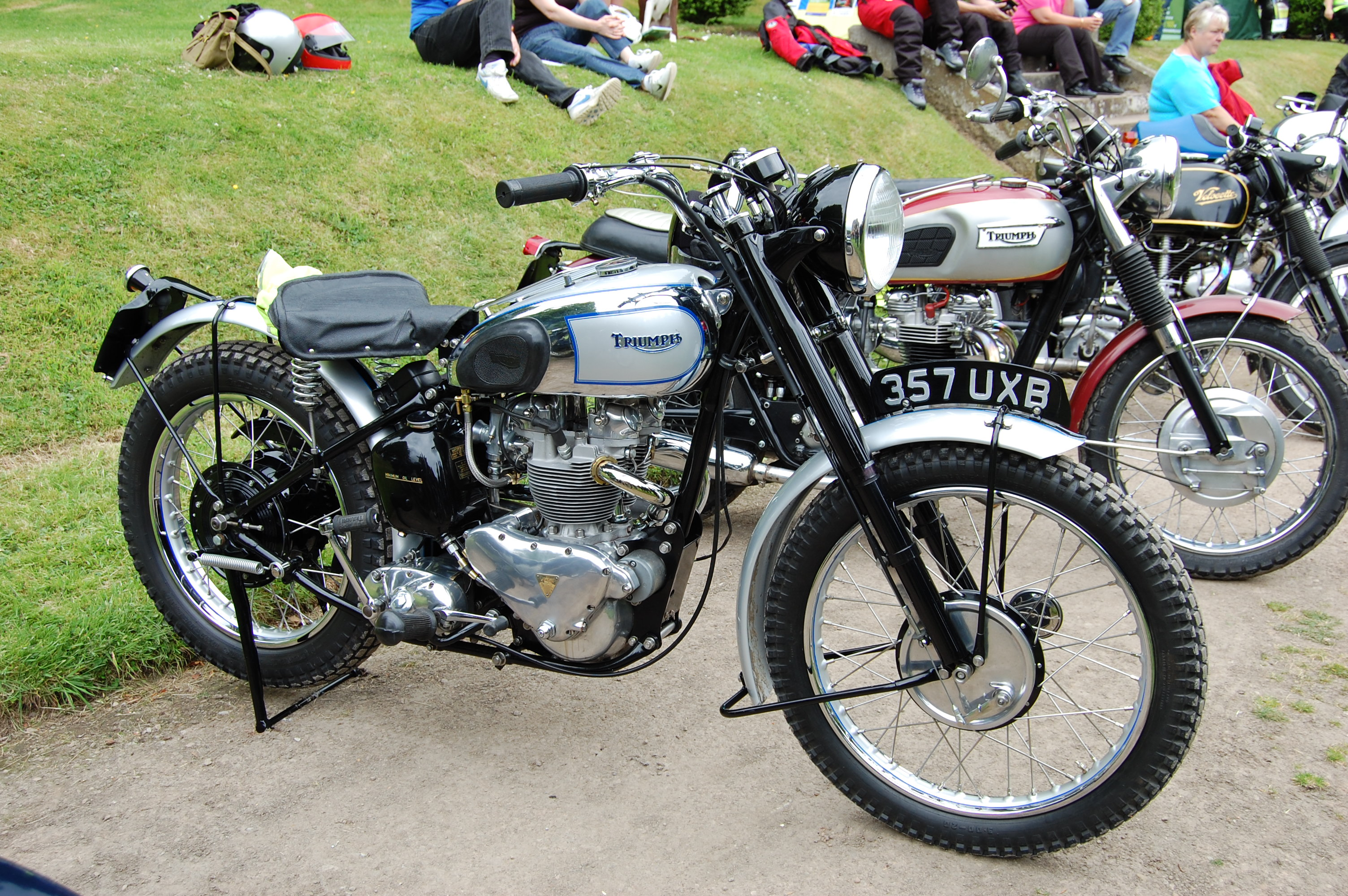
- Manufacturer: Triumph
- Production: 1949-1958
- Class: Standard
- Engine: 498 cc (30.4 cu in) OHV four stroke parallel twin

The TR5 Trophy was a standard motorcycle made by Triumph Engineering at the Meriden factory between 1949 and 1958.

== Development ==
Based on the Speed Twin, the TR5 was a trials machine designed for off-road use with a high level two into one exhaust and good handling on public roads. The name 'Trophy' came from the three 'specials' that Triumph built for the Italian International Six Day Trial in 1948, which went on to win three gold medals and the manufacturers team trophy. Racing in American Motorcyclist Association (AMA) Class C until 1969, the American export models included components from the Tiger 100 to create a motorcycle for desert competition.

The original TR5 Trophy models of 1949 used the aluminum cylinder barrels and heads from a generator motor Triumph had supplied for the War Department in WW2. This was Triumph's first aluminum cylinder head/barrel, and factory employees speculated during the War that the alloy heads, with their superior cooling properties, could easily be adapted for a motorcycle. The TR5 Trophy models from 1949 to 1950 used modified versions of these cylinder heads, nicknamed the 'square barrel'. From 1951 the 498 cc (30.4 cu in) engine was updated with new alloy barrels and heads with finer-pitch finning and a rounded profile, which was shared with the Tiger 100 model. The TR5 was replaced with a new range of unit construction twins in 1959.

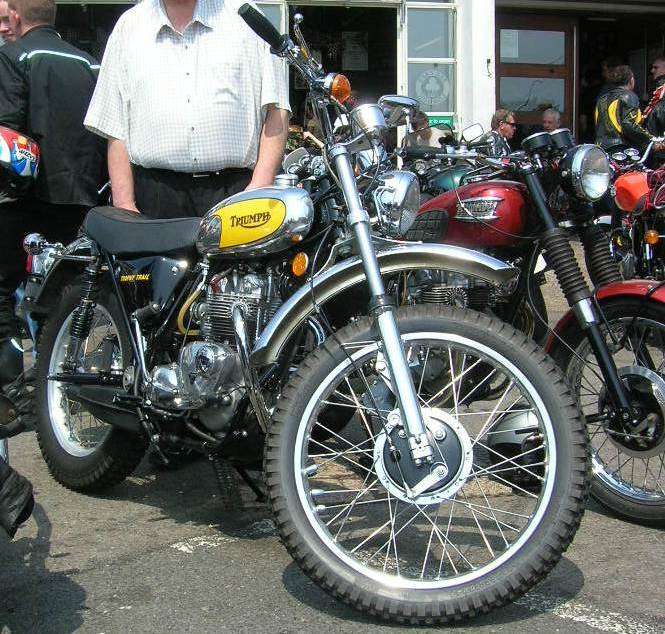
Triumph TR5T Trophy Trail built for 1973 and 1974. Also known as the Adventurer.

== Trophy name ==
The Trophy name was extended to the TR6 Trophy and resurrected for the Trophy 500 (T100C) in 1971, which in turn was replaced by the Trophy Trail (TR5T) in 1973. This model enjoyed competition success gaining the British team individual gold medals and 2nd place overall in the 1973 ISDT competition held in the critical USA market. The new Triumph Motorcycles company also used the Trophy name for the Trophy 900 and Trophy 1200 models.

== James Dean ==
Inspired by Marlon Brando's 6T Triumph Thunderbird in The Wild One, James Dean bought a Triumph TR5 Trophy. Phil Stern's series of iconic photographs of Dean show him on this bike. It was sold after the actor's death, and then was retrieved, restored and displayed at the James Dean Gallery in Fairmount, Indiana.

== Happy Days ==
The Fonz, a character played by Henry Winkler in the popular and long-running American sit-com Happy Days, rode a mildly customized 1949 Trophy TR5 starting in Season 2. The motorcycle was provided by stuntman and Triumph dealer Bud Ekins, who removed the front fender, painted the fuel tank silver and changed the handlebars. The bike used in the sitcom was put up for auction in October 2011.

== See also ==
- List of Triumph motorcycles
