= Triumph Thruxton =

British motorcycle

Triumph Thruxton 900
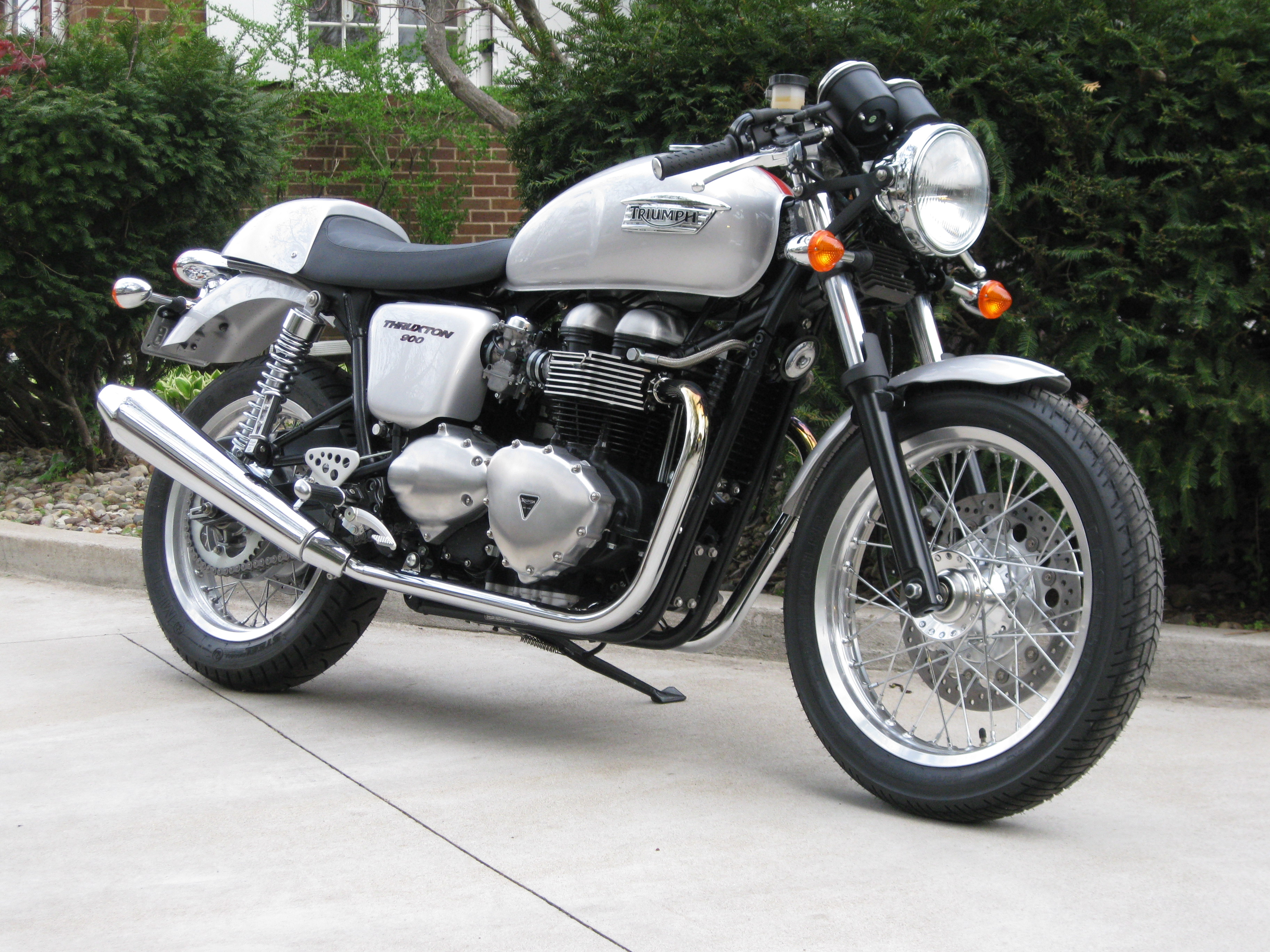
- Manufacturer: Triumph
- Production: 2004–2015
- Engine: 865 cc (52.8 cu in) Air-cooled, DOHC, 360º crank angle parallel twin, four stroke
- Bore / stroke: 90 mm × 68 mm (3.5 in × 2.7 in)
- Power: 68 bhp (51 kW) @ 7,250 rpm
- Torque: 72 N⋅m (53 lbf⋅ft) @ 5,750 rpm
- Transmission: 5 speed chain drive
- Wheelbase: 56.7 in (1,440 mm)
- Dimensions: L: 87.1 in (2,212 mm)
- Seat height: 31.1 inches (79 cm)
- Weight: 451 pounds (205 kg) (dry)
- Fuel capacity: 16 L (3.5 imp gal; 4.2 US gal)

Triumph Thruxton 1200
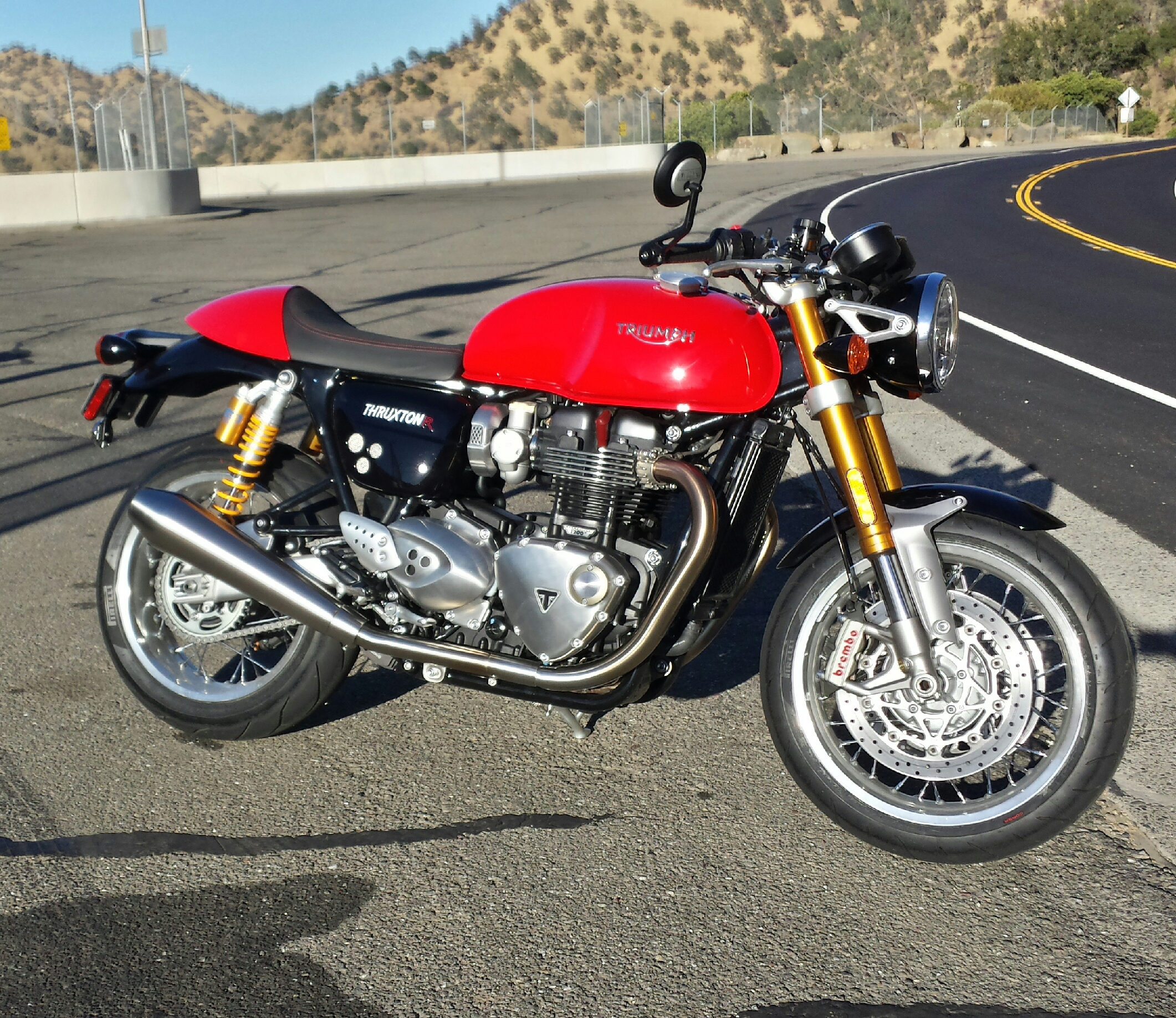
- Manufacturer: Triumph
- Production: since 2016
- Engine: 1,197 cc (73.0 cu in) Liquid-cooled, 8-valve, SOHC, 270° crank angle parallel-twin, four stroke twin
- Bore / stroke: 97.6 mm × 80 mm (3.84 in × 3.15 in)
- Power: 97 bhp (72 kW) @ 6,750 rpm
- Torque: 112 N⋅m (83 lbf⋅ft) @ 4,950 rpm
- Transmission: 6 speed chain drive
- Wheelbase: 55.7 in (1,415 mm)
- Dimensions: L: 82.9 in (2,106 mm); W: 29.3 in (744 mm); H: 40.6 in (1,031 mm)
- Seat height: 31.9 inches (81 cm)
- Weight: 448 pounds (203 kg) (dry)
- Fuel capacity: 14.5 L (3.2 imp gal; 3.8 US gal)
- Related: Triumph Speed Twin 900

The Triumph Thruxton is a series of British motorcycles with parallel-twin engines and sports styling. The name Thruxton was first applied to a handbuilt machine for endurance racing in the mid-1960s, and later revived in the 2000s.

== History & design ==
The bike is named after Thruxton Circuit, a race track in Hampshire where in 1969 Triumph won the top three places in the Thruxton 500 mile endurance race.

== Variations ==
=== Thruxton Bonneville ===
The first bike to use the name was the Thruxton Bonneville, a limited-edition production-class racer hand-built in 1965 by the Triumph Engineering factory race shop at their Meriden Works based on the Bonneville T120. The Thruxton Bonneville was developed for homologation purposes and it was entered into British endurance races by local agents.

=== Thruxton 900 ===
In 2004, the reborn Triumph Motorcycles factory at Hinckley adopted the Thruxton name for the Thruxton 900, an air-cooled 360° twin derived from the company's Bonneville, with hallmark café racer modifications, including rearset footrests, small flyscreen, analogue instruments, reverse-cone exhaust silencers, and seat cowl. The carburetted 900 models (2004–2008) were built at the Hinckley plant in the U.K..

The Thruxton 900's engine is upgraded from the Bonneville engine of the same model year, with new cams and pistons increased to 90 mm, taking capacity to 865 cc and power up to 70 bhp (52 kW). The frame is a tubular steel cradle with a twin-sided swingarm and traditional spoked wheels, 36-spoke (18 x 2.5 inch) front and 40-spoke (17 x 3.5 inch) rear. Front suspension has 41 mm forks with adjustable pre-loading and rear has chrome spring twin shock absorbers with adjustable pre-load. Front brakes are a single 320 mm floating disc and rear a smaller 255 mm disc, both with twin piston callipers.

=== Thruxton 1200 ===
In 2016, the 900 was superseded by two 270° 1200cc water-cooled similarly styled café racers, the Triumph Thruxton and Triumph Thruxton R. The standard 1200 Thruxton has conventional cartridge forks and fixed discs, while the "R" has upgraded Öhlins rear suspension with Showa USD "big piston" forks and Brembo front radial calipers with floating discs. Both 1200 Thruxtons have traction control, ABS, and ride by wire throttles featuring three modes, sport, road, and rain. Being of similar weight to the 900 but with 42% more power, the 1200 has a much improved power-to-weight ratio; but at over 200 kg (dry), neither bike should be considered a lightweight.

Both Thruxton 900 & 1200 models are produced at John Bloor's Chonburi plant, but the original Thruxton was a special based on the Triumph Bonneville from the factory at Meriden Works, where, from May 1965, Triumph produced 52 tuned Thruxton Bonnies to homologate the type for production racing. The modern Hinckley Thruxtons (and Bonnevilles too) are "softer" and less extreme; whereas the original Thruxton achieved top speeds over 140 mph (230 km/h), the Thruxton 900 manages only 120 mph (190 km/h).

== Styling ==
When the Hinckley factory began making modern triples such as the Trident and Daytona, even though the inspiration was perhaps the Meriden Trident, no attempt was made to link the new bikes with their Meriden forebears.

By contrast, when the Hinckley factory started to design new parallel twins, it was deemed vital to make the new bikes adopt similar "retro" styling to their Meriden predecessors. For instance, the new twins have a "timing chest" on the right, a "primary chaincase" is on the left, twin "rocker boxes", a R/H side panel resembling a dry-sump oil tank, and throttle bodies which resemble carburettors, even though the engines are fuel-injected. Triumph's desire for "retro authenticity" prescribed a tubular cradle frame, a decision which caused the bikes to be heavier than they otherwise might have been.

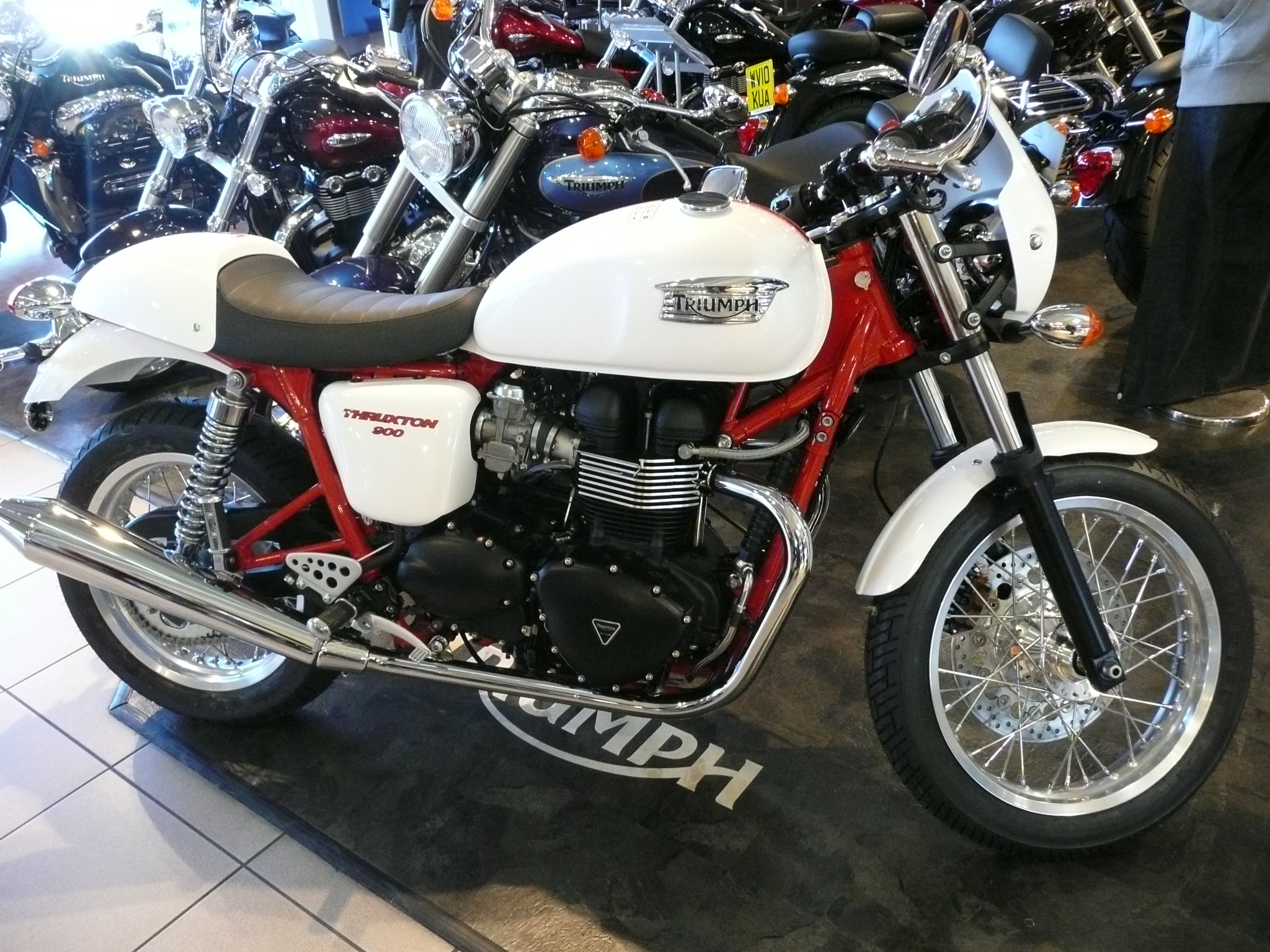
A Thruxton 900 with a black engine

== Reception ==
The Thruxton 900 was reviewed by The Daily Telegraph in 2014, saying: "It's easy to understand why the Thruxton's blend of retro style, gentle performance and practicality, combined with a reasonable price, have made it a long-running success".

The Thruxton 1200R was reviewed by Motor Cycle News in 2016, saying "The styling and attention to detail lavished on the Thruxton is second to none. The R’s handling is right out of the top drawer thanks to excellent brakes, suspension and chassis balance and the electronics marry the whole package together. ".

== Triumph Thruxton Cup Challenge ==
In 2005, Triumph Motorcycles (America) Ltd. and the American Historic Racing Motorcycle Association (AHRMA) developed the Triumph Thruxton Cup Challenge at Pueblo Motorsports Park in Colorado as a “spec” class race limited to the Triumph Thruxton 900. Ted “Cannonball” Cobb, won the inaugural cup.

== See also ==
- Velocette Thruxton
