= Triumph Trophy =

British motorcycle

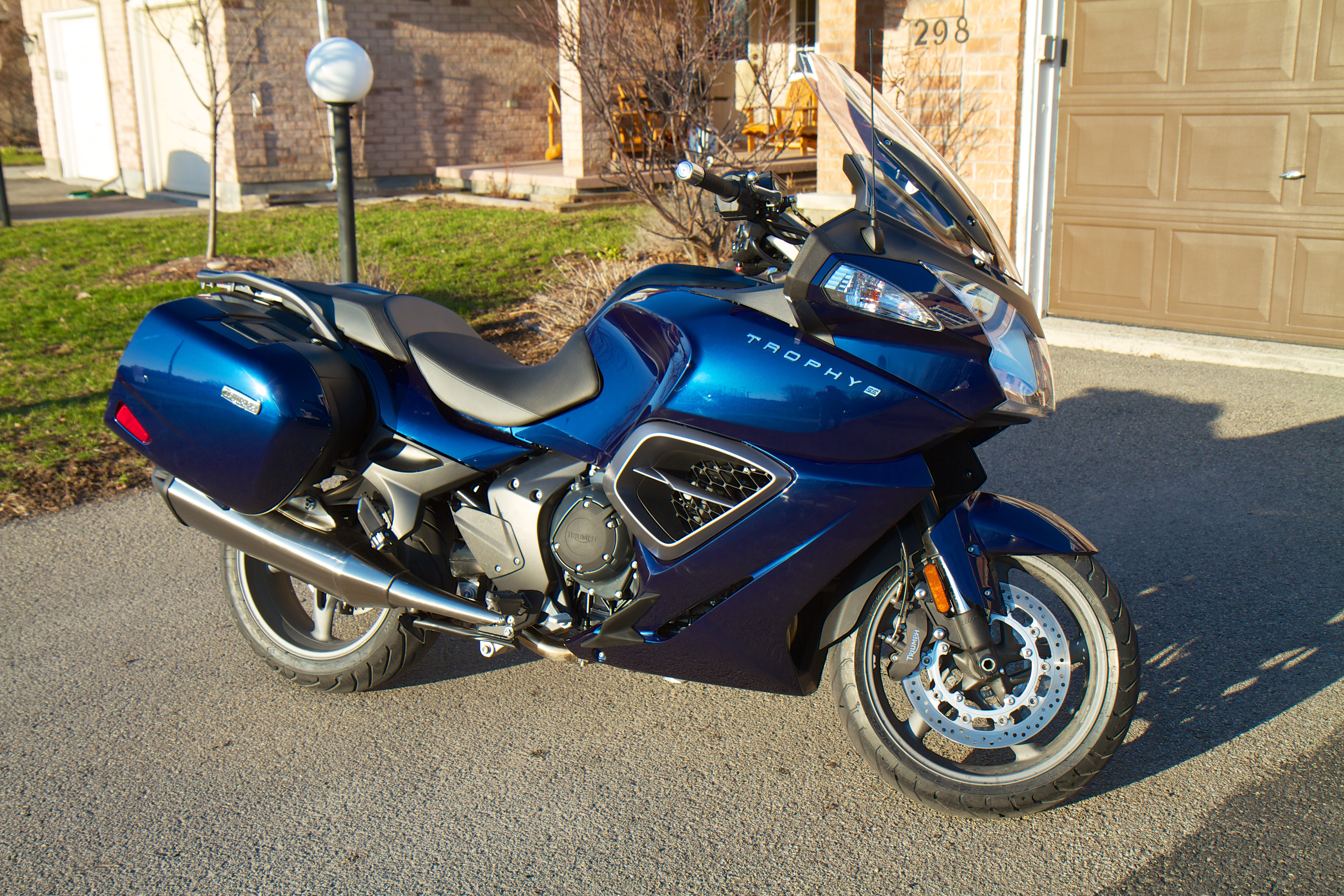
- 2013 Pacific Blue Triumph Trophy SE
- Manufacturer: Triumph
- Production: 2012–2017
- Assembly: Hinckley, England
- Predecessor: Triumph Trophy 1200
- Class: Touring motorcycle
- Engine: 1,215 cc (74.1 cu in) Liquid-cooled, 12 valve, DOHC, in-line 3-cylinder
- Bore / stroke: 85 mm × 71.4 mm (3.35 in × 2.81 in)
- Transmission: 6-speed shaft drive
- Frame type: Aluminium beam twin-spar
- Suspension: Front - WP 43 mm upside down forks, manually adjustable rebound damping, with 130 mm travel. SE - WP 43 mm upside down forks, electronically adjustable rebound damping (sport/normal/comfort) with 127 mm travel. Rear - WP monoshock with remote oil reservoir, manually adjustable hydraulic preload, manually adjustable rebound damping, 120 mm rear wheel travel. (SE electronically adjustable hydraulic preload, electronically adjustable rebound damping.
- Brakes: Combined braking system / ABS; Front: Twin 320 mm discs, Nissin 4-piston callipers Rear: Single 282 mm disc, Nissin 2-piston calliper
- Tyres: Front: 120/70 ZR17; Rear: 190/55 ZR17
- Rake, trail: 27.0º / 119 mm (4.7 in)
- Wheelbase: 1,542 mm (60.7 in)
- Dimensions: L: 2,235 mm (88.0 in); W: 975 mm (38.4 in); H: 1,555 mm (61.2 in)
- Seat height: 800–820 mm (31–32 in), 770–790 mm (30–31 in) with low seat
- Weight: 301 kg (664 lb) (wet)
- Fuel capacity: 26 L (5.7 imp gal; 6.9 US gal)
- Oil capacity: 4 L (4.2 US qt)

The Triumph Trophy is a touring motorcycle produced by Triumph Motorcycles Ltd from 2012 to 2017.

The motorcycle features a 1,215 cc (74.1 cu in) liquid-cooled, 12-valve, straight-three engine, which is mated to a six-speed gearbox and shaft drive. The engine is also used on its dual-sport sibling, the Tiger Explorer, although on the Trophy it produces slightly less power and has a taller sixth gear, more suitable for the touring proposal of this motorcycle. The base model was complemented by the SE, which features extra equipment such as electronically adjustable suspension, a Bluetooth audio system, and a tyre-pressure monitoring system. The SE was the only model sold in the United States, Canada, Australia and Brazil.
