= Triumph Daytona T300 =

Daytona 750/900/1000/1200
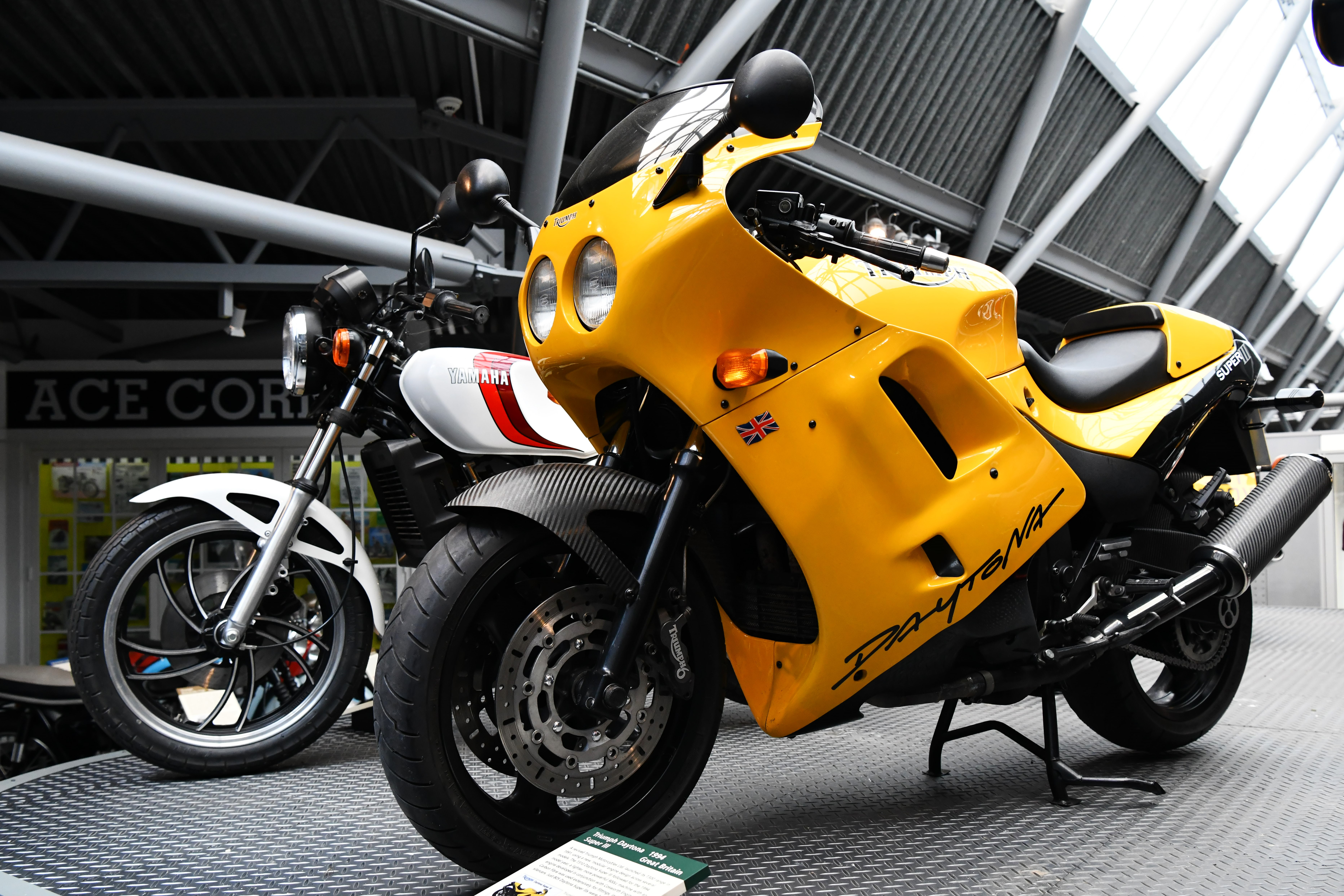
- Triumph Daytona 900
- Manufacturer: Triumph Motorcycles Ltd
- Production: 1991–1998 (not produced in 1997)
- Assembly: Hinckley
- Class: Sports motorcycle
- Engine: 885 cc (54.0 cu in) four-stroke triple
- Bore / stroke: 76 x 65 mm
- Compression ratio: 10.6:1
- Power: 98 PS (72 kW) at 9,000 rpm
- Torque: 83 N⋅m (61 lbf⋅ft) at 6,500 rpm
- Ignition type: Electronic
- Transmission: Six-speed
- Frame type: Tubular high-tensile steel
- Suspension: 43 mm telescopic forks, gas-pressurised rear monoshock
- Tires: 120/70R17 front, 180/5560R17 rear
- Wheelbase: 59 in (1,490 mm)
- Seat height: 31 in (790 mm)
- Weight: 470 lb (210 kg) (dry)
- Fuel capacity: 25 L (5.5 imp gal; 6.6 US gal) (includes 5 L (1.1 imp gal; 1.3 US gal) reserve)
- Related: Triumph Trident
- Footnotes / references 1996 Daytona 900 specifications

The Triumph Daytona and Daytona Super 3 (model codes T331, T332, T343, T344, T354 and T357) is a three or four-cylinder British sports motorcycle. These bikes were produced from 1991 to 1996 at Hinckley, Leicestershire, England, by Triumph Motorcycles Ltd, the successor business to the defunct Triumph Engineering at Meriden Works, Warwickshire, England.

== Overview ==
A range of new 750 cc and 900 cc triple-cylinder bikes and 1,000 cc and 1,200 cc four-cylinder bikes were launched at the September 1990 Cologne Motorcycle Show. The motorcycles used famous model names from the glory days of Meriden Triumph and were first made available to the public between March (Trophy 1200 being the first) and September 1991. The range had been revealed to the press in June 1990 at the Hinckley Factory and were introduced to the public in December at the International Motorcycle Show at the National Exhibition Centre, Birmingham.

The Daytona range uses a modular liquid-cooled double overhead camshaft (DOHC) engine design in a steel frame with a large-diameter backbone design. The modular design ensured that a variety of models could be offered whilst keeping production costs under control.

=== Frame and cycle parts ===
The high-tensile steel tubular frame has a large diameter spine based on that of the Triumph Bonneville T140, though engine oil is not held in the frame. Japanese companies supplied cycle parts including Nissin (hydraulic disc brakes) and Showa or Kayaba for the front telescopic fork suspension.

== Models ==
=== Daytona 750 and 1000 ===
The Daytona was initially offered in 1991 with either a three-cylinder 749 cc engine (T330, 331 and 332) or a 998 cc four-cylinder engine (T343, 344 and 345).

=== Daytona 900 and 1200 ===
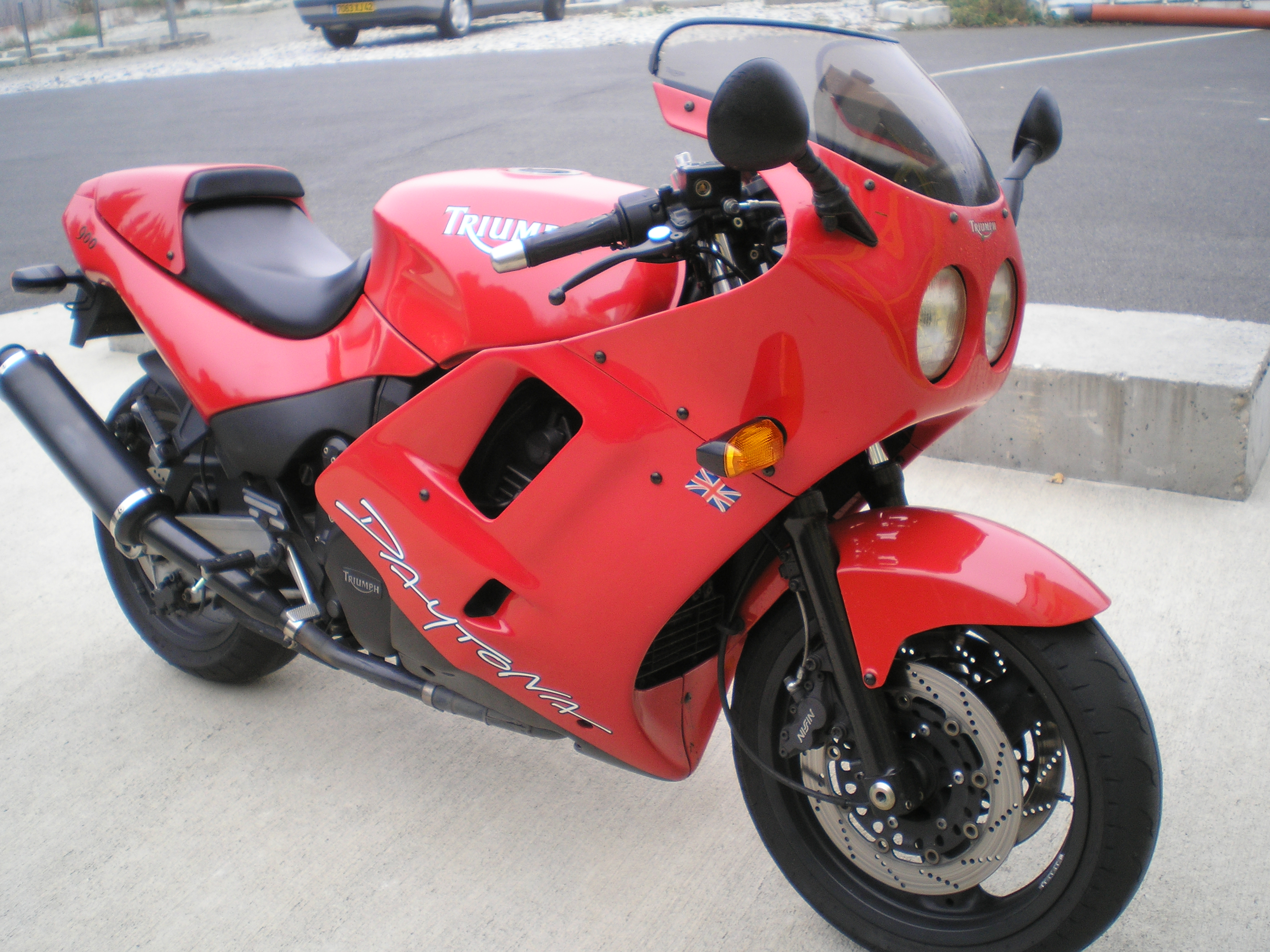
Triumph Daytona 900

In 1993 the 750 engine option was dropped in favour of an 885 cc triple engine that was already in use with the Trident and Trophy range (model code T357). Similarly the Daytona 1000 engine was substituted for a tuned version of the 1,180 cc four-cylinder engine used by the Trophy 1200, model code T354.

=== Daytona Super 3 ===
The Daytona Super 3 (T310) of 1994 was a lightened 900 cc machine that used a higher power engine jointly developed by Triumph and Cosworth.

=== Daytona 1200 SE ===
In 1998 a small run of 250 Special Edition Daytona 1200s were produced.

The T300 Daytona range was replaced in 1997 by the Triumph Daytona 955i, originally known as the T595.

== See also ==
- List of Triumph motorcycles
