= Triumph Twenty One =

British motorcycle

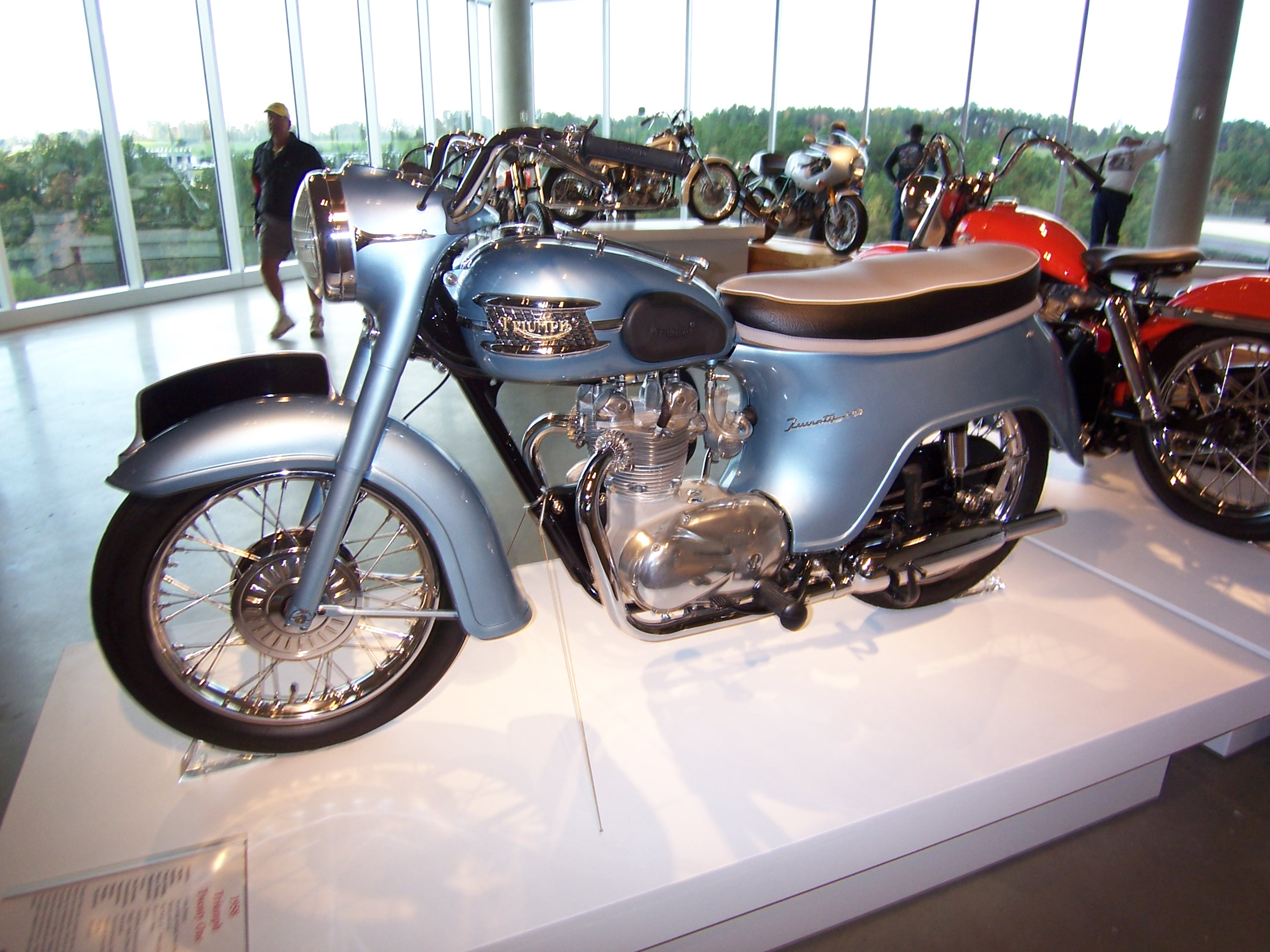
- Manufacturer: Triumph Engineering Co Ltd
- Also called: T21, Twenty One, 'Bathtub'
- Production: 1957–1966
- Class: Standard
- Engine: 349 cc (21.3 cu in), air-cooled, four-stroke, twin
- Transmission: Four-speed, chain final drive

The Triumph Twenty One (also known as the 3TA) is a standard motorcycle made by Triumph Engineering Co Ltd in Coventry. The Model Twenty One was the first of the Triumph unit construction twin cylinder motorcycles. Rebranded as the Triumph 3TA in 1959, it was in production until 1966. Production of the Triumph T90, a sports version of the 3TA, continued after that.

== Development ==
Launched in 1957 the Model Twenty One was the first of the Triumph unit construction twin cylinder motorcycles from the Meriden factory. With a capacity of 349 cc, the engine was a classic Edward Turner design with a 360 degree crankshaft, twin gear driven camshafts and twin plunger oil pump. The cylinder block was cast iron with an alloy head and separate rocker boxes. The engine was dry sump lubrication and there was a single Amal Monobloc carburettor. Drive was by a conventional four speed gearbox, with a right foot gear lever.

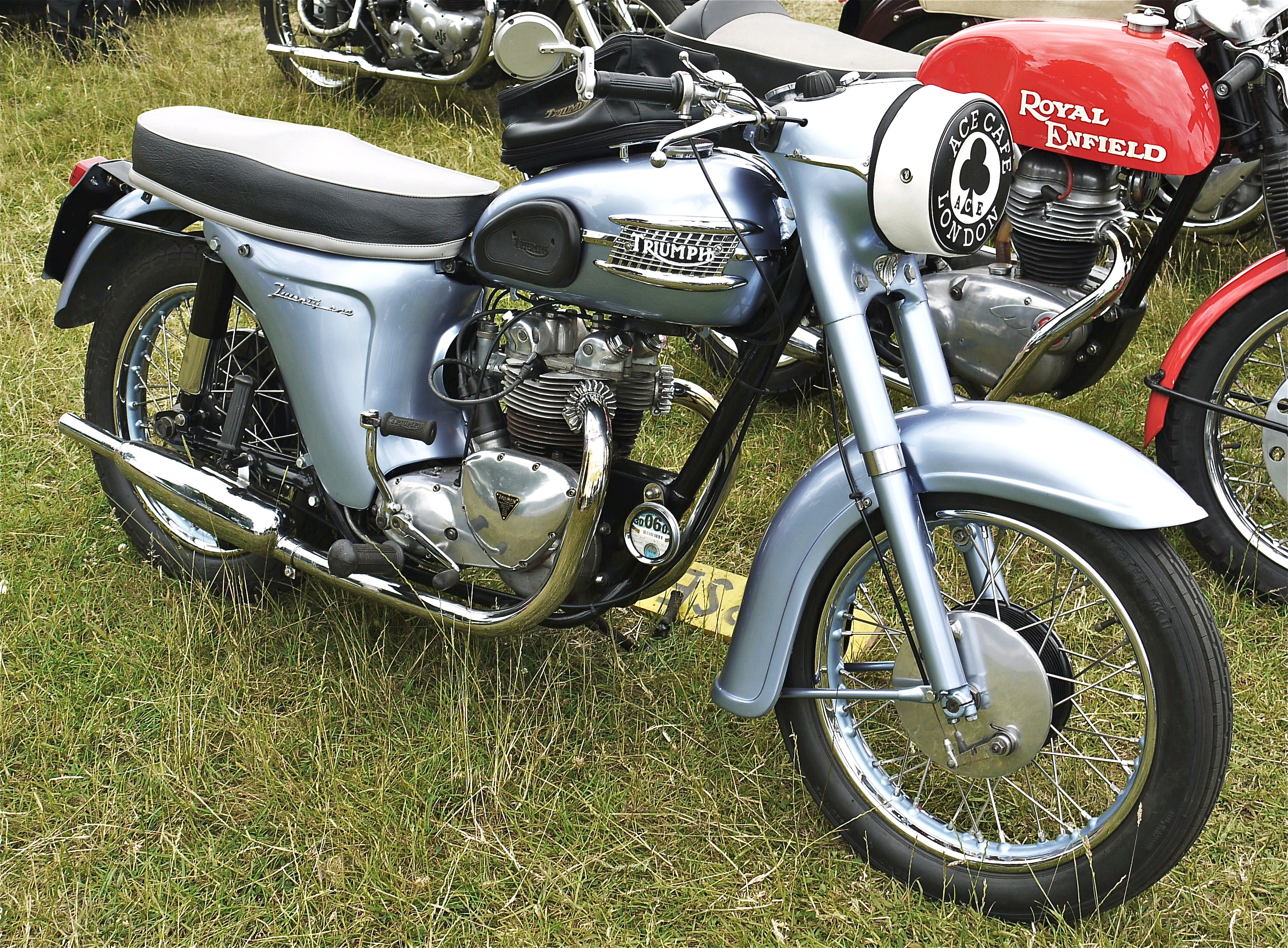
Triumph 'Twenty One' with the abbreviated 'bikini' version of the 'bathtub' rear fairing

There are two explanations for the 'Twenty One' name spelt out in full on the side panels. The first explanation is that it celebrates the twenty-first anniversary of Triumph Engineering Co Ltd. The second explanation is that the important US export market rated motorcycle engine displacement in cubic inches and 21 cubic inches equates to 350 cc.

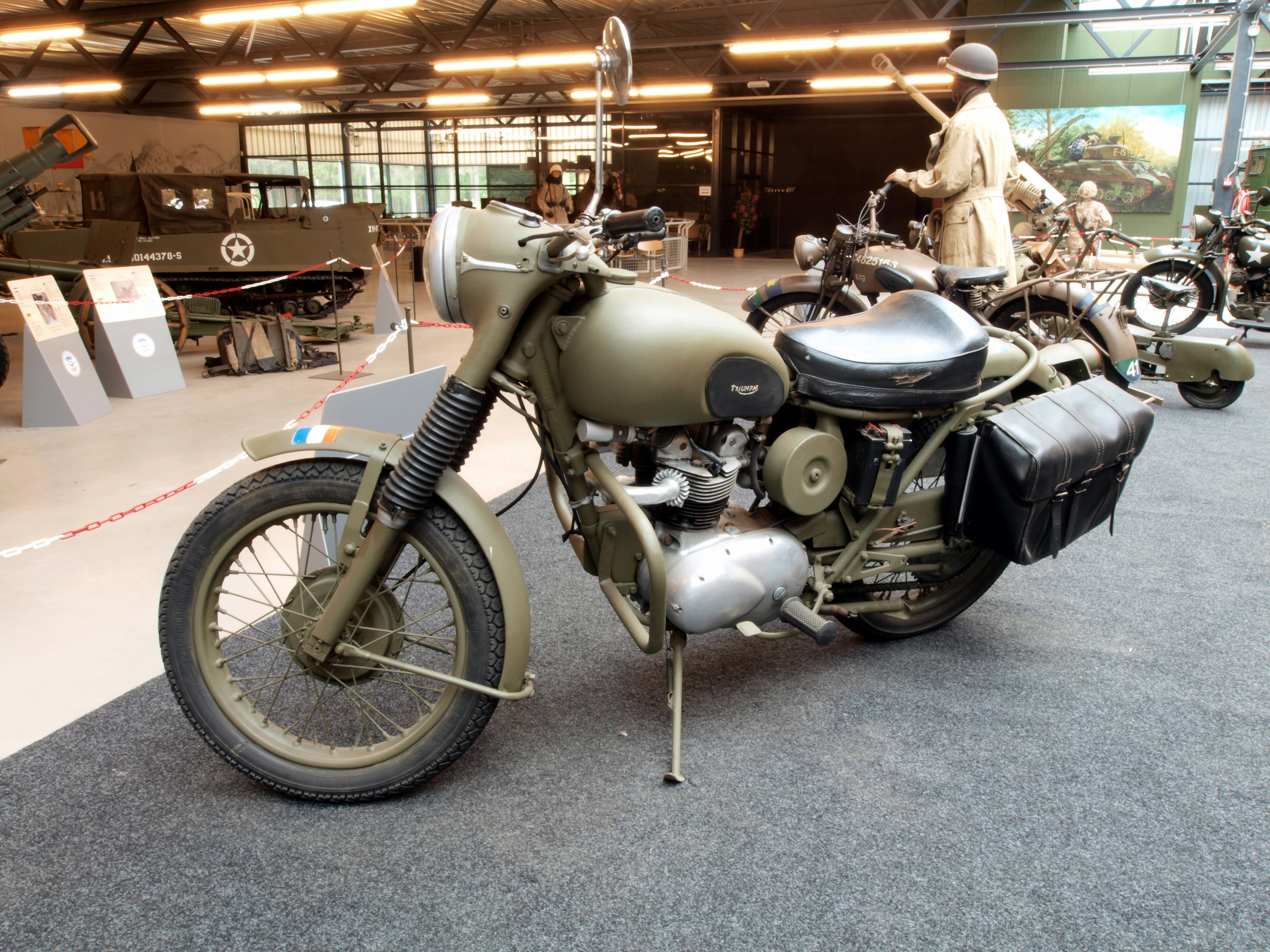
One of the last versions: a 1966 Dutch Army Triumph 3TA 'Twenty One', now on display at the Marshallmuseum, Overloon.

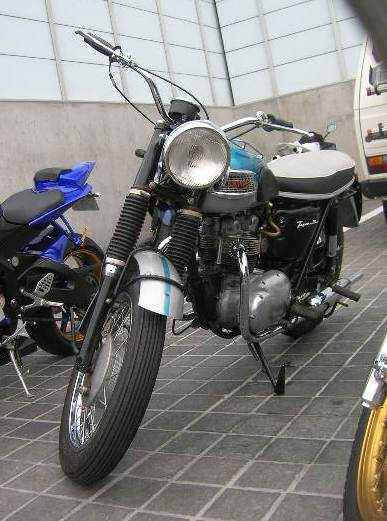
1965 350cc Triumph T90 Tiger. Built from 1962 to 1968, this was the sports version of the Triumph Twenty One

In 1959 the Twenty One was rebranded the Triumph 3TA and also produced as a 500 cc version, the Triumph 5TA, which was also referred to as the 'new Speed Twin'. The 'A' designation was a reference to the fact that both motorcycles were fitted with an alternator as standard, as the pre-unit models had been fitted with a Dynamo. The original versions of both the 350 cc and 500 cc models had the fully enclosed rear end which was fashionable in the late 1950s. It was not popular with American customers, where the extra weather protection was less important however, and it got called the 'bathtub'. They also found that the extra sheet metal made access for servicing more complicated. Only the final 3TA model for 1966 dispensed entirely with the rear fairing.

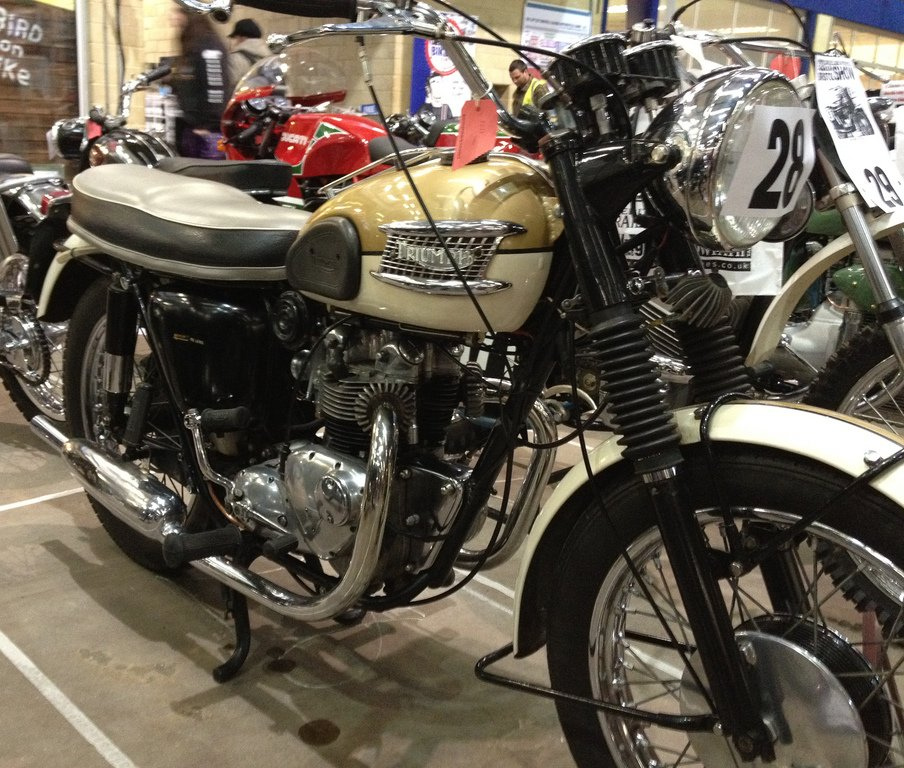
After a single season, the 1964 350cc Triumph T90 Tiger dispensed with the unpopular 'semi-bathtub' or 'bikini' rear fairing still to be found upon the 3TA.

The 3TA and the 5TA both continued in production until 1966 when they were survived by their sportier versions, the T90 and T100 respectively.

== See also ==
- List of Triumph motorcycles
