= Triumph Trophy (T300) =

Trophy 900/1200
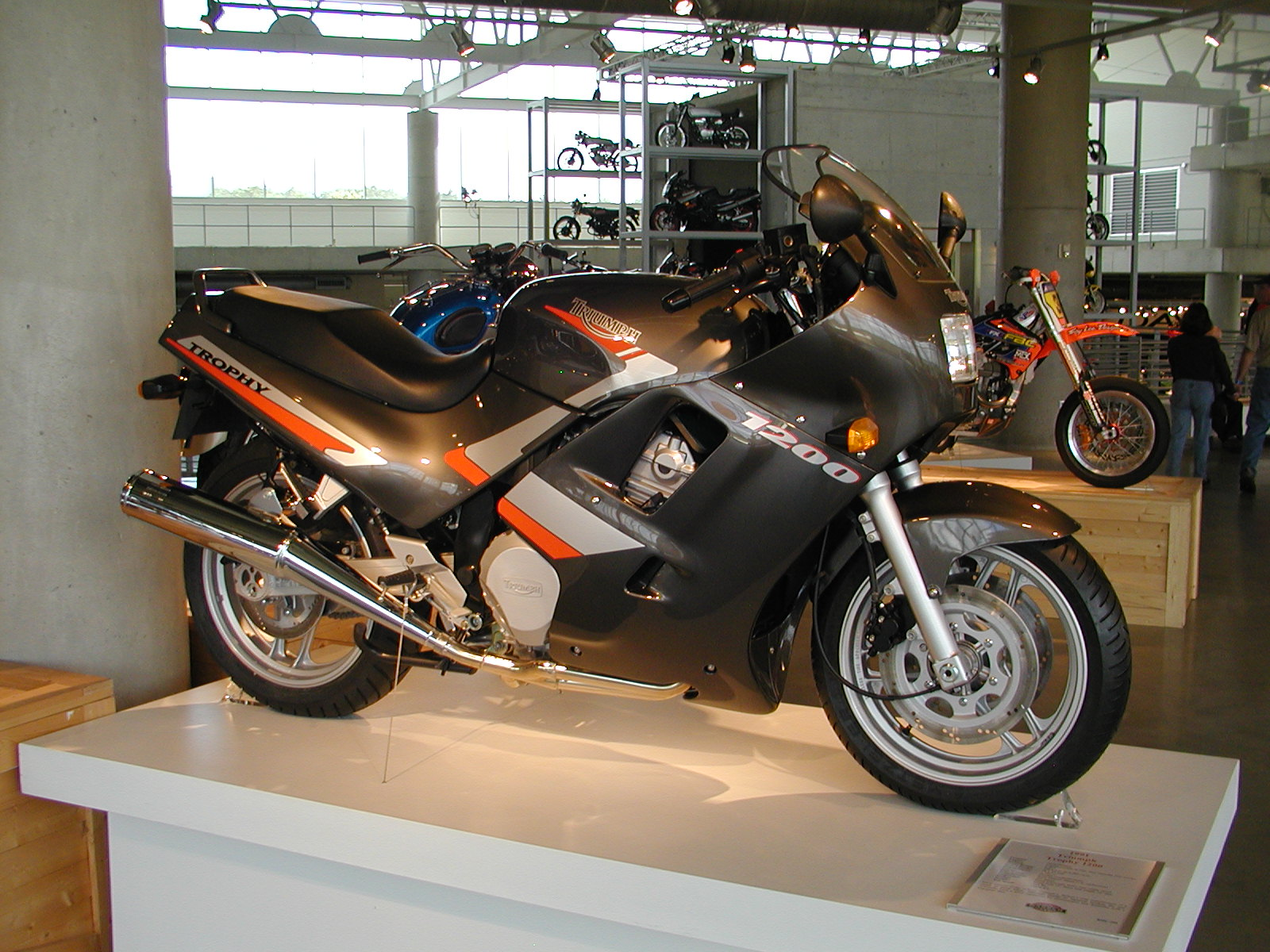
- Manufacturer: Triumph Motorcycles Ltd
- Production: 1991–2003
- Assembly: Hinckley
- Class: Touring motorcycle
- Engine: 885 cc (54.0 cu in) (1200: 1,180 cc (72 cu in)) four-stroke triple/four
- Bore / stroke: 76 x 65 mm
- Compression ratio: 10.6:1
- Power: 98 PS (72 kW) at 9,000 rpm (1200: 108 PS (79 kW) at 9,000 rpm)
- Torque: 83 N⋅m (61 lbf⋅ft) at 6,500 rpm (1200: 104 N⋅m (77 lbf⋅ft) at 5,000 rpm
- Ignition type: Electronic
- Transmission: Six-speed
- Frame type: Tubular high-tensile steel
- Suspension: 43 mm telescopic forks, gas-pressurised rear monoshock
- Tires: 120/70R17 front, 160/60R18 rear
- Wheelbase: 59 in (1,490 mm)
- Seat height: 31 in (800 mm)
- Weight: 900: 489 lb (222 kg), 1200: 529 lb (240 kg) (dry); 900: 549 lb (249 kg), 1200: 589 lb (267 kg) (wet)
- Fuel capacity: 25 L (5.5 imp gal; 6.6 US gal) (includes 5 L (1.1 imp gal; 1.3 US gal) reserve)
- Related: Triumph Trident
- Footnotes / references 1991 specifications

The Triumph Trophy (model codes T336 and T340) is a three or four-cylinder touring motorcycle of either 885 cc or 1,180 cc capacity. These bikes were produced from 1991 to 2003 at Hinckley, Leicestershire, England, by Triumph Motorcycles Ltd, the successor business to the defunct Triumph Engineering at Meriden Works, Warwickshire, England.

== Overview ==
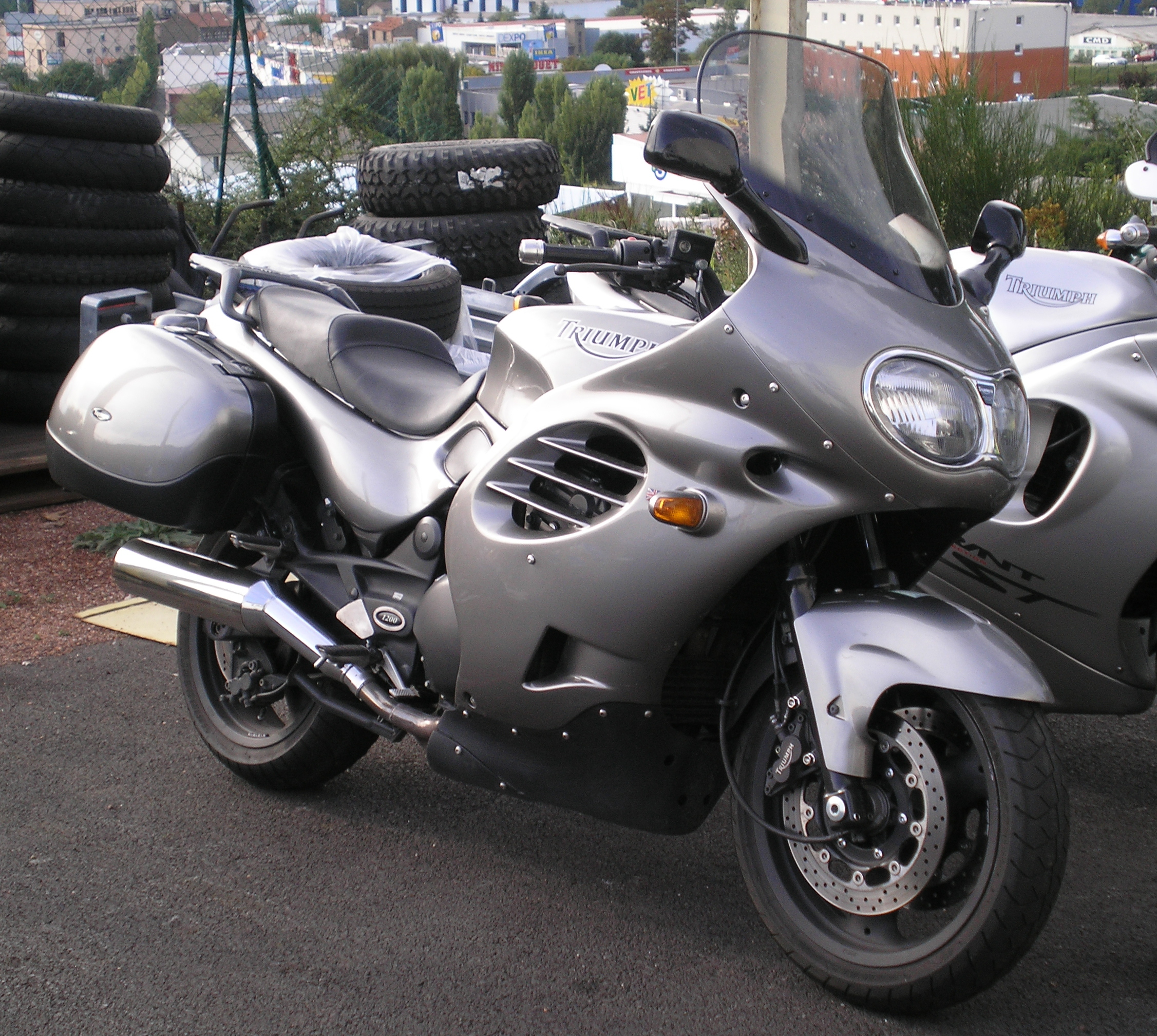
Trophy 1200, 1996 updated bodywork

A range of new 750 cc and 900 cc triple-cylinder bikes and 1,000 cc and 1,200 cc four-cylinder bikes were launched at the September 1990 Cologne Motorcycle Show. The motorcycles used famous model names from the glory days of Meriden Triumph and were first made available to the public between March (Trophy 1200 being the first) and September 1991. The range had been revealed to the press in June 1990 at the Hinckley Factory and were introduced to the public in December at the International Motorcycle Show at the National Exhibition Centre, Birmingham.

The Trophy uses a modular liquid-cooled double overhead camshaft (DOHC) engine design in a steel frame with a large-diameter backbone design. The modular design ensured that a variety of models could be offered whilst keeping production costs under control.

=== Frame and cycle parts ===
The high-tensile steel tubular frame has a large diameter spine based on that of the Triumph Bonneville T140, though engine oil is not held in the frame. Japanese companies supplied cycle parts including Nissin (hydraulic disc brakes) and Showa or Kayaba for the front telescopic fork suspension.

== Development ==
In 1996 a wind tunnel tested twin-headlight full fairing was added along with optional hard luggage.

== See also ==
- List of Triumph motorcycles
