= Triumph Speed Twin 900 =

British motorcycle

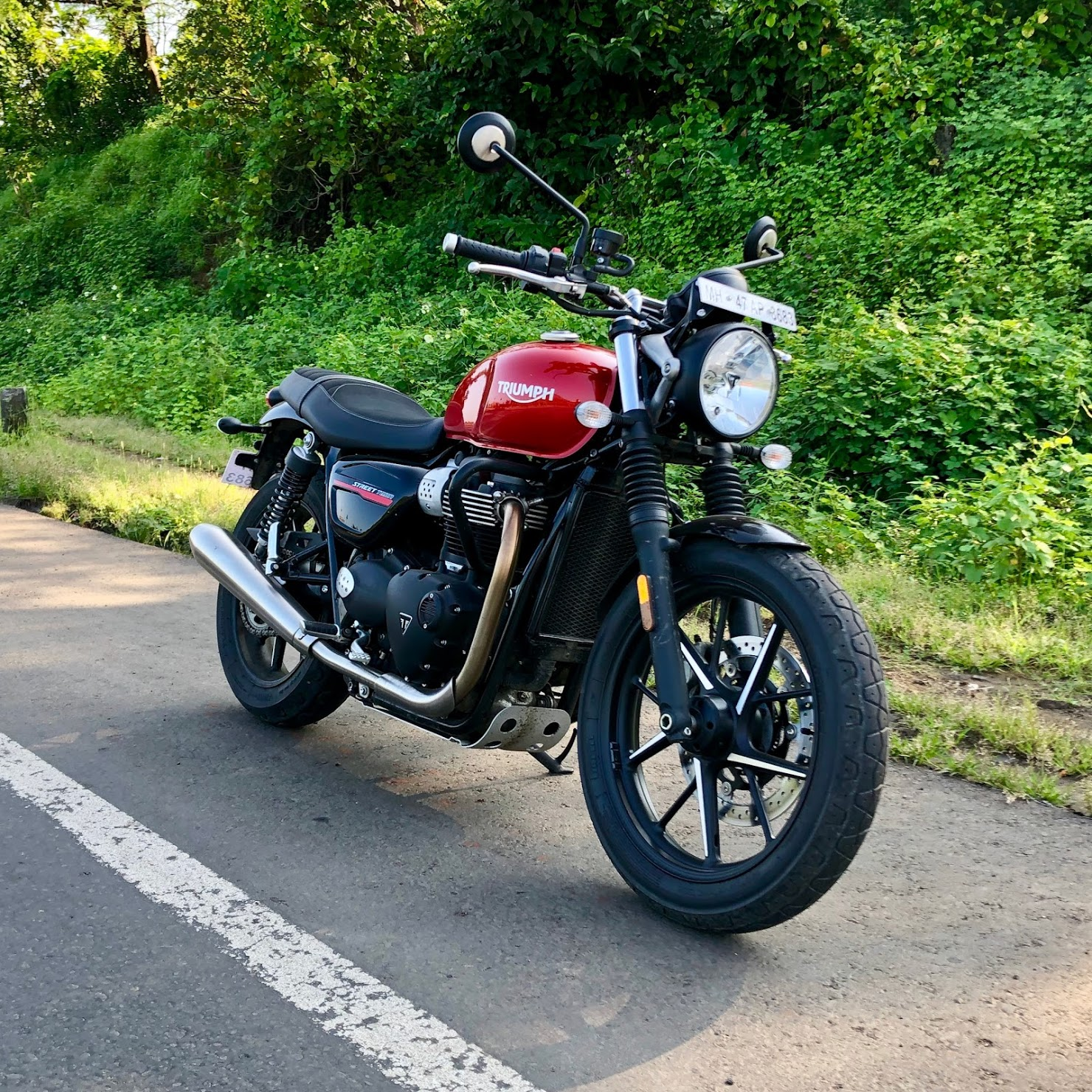
- Manufacturer: Triumph
- Also called: Triumph Street Twin (until 2022)
- Production: 2016–present
- Predecessor: Triumph Bonneville SE
- Class: Naked bike
- Engine: 900 cc (55 cu in) parallel-twin, liquid-cooled, four-stroke
- Bore / stroke: 84.6 mm × 80 mm (3.33 in × 3.15 in)
- Compression ratio: 11.0:1
- Power: 64.1 hp (48 kW) @ 7,500 rpm
- Torque: 80 N⋅m (59 lb⋅ft) @ 3,800 rpm
- Transmission: 5-speed
- Wheelbase: 57.1 in (1,450 mm)
- Weight: 476 lb (216 kg) (wet)
- Fuel capacity: 12 L (2.6 imp gal; 3.2 US gal)

The Triumph Speed Twin 900, previously known as the Triumph Street Twin, is a naked bike, produced by Triumph Motorcycles. Introduced in October 2015, the Speed Twin 900 is assembled in Chonburi, Thailand, and is the successor to the Bonneville SE.

== History ==
The Street Twin was presented on 28 October 2015 after four years of development. On 5 July 2022, the Street Twin was renamed the Speed Twin 900.

== Specifications ==
The Speed Twin 900 offers a two-cylinder in-line four-stroke engine that has a displacement of 900 cm^{3} (55 cu in), equipped with a liquid cooling system, and it runs on a multipoint electronic injection system, producing a maximum power of 55 hp (41 kW) at 5900 rpm and a torque of 80 N⋅m (59 lbf⋅ft) at 3230 rpm, which is bolted to a 5-speed transmission with front engagement.

The Speed Twin 900 is built on a steel frame, and it is mounted by a 41 mm telescopic fork protected by bellows and a double-sided swingarm at the front and rear respectively. The Nissin braking system consists of a single 310 mm (12 in) disc system at the front with a two-piston floating caliper, while at the rear a single 255 mm (10.0 in) disc always with a two-piston floating caliper; both of them have ABS as standard.

In October 2018, at Intermot, an updated version of the Street Twin was presented, not only in terms of chassis but also mechanics. The engine received an update and it included more power, which was elevated from 55 to 65 hp.
