= Triumph TR6 Trophy =

British motorcycle

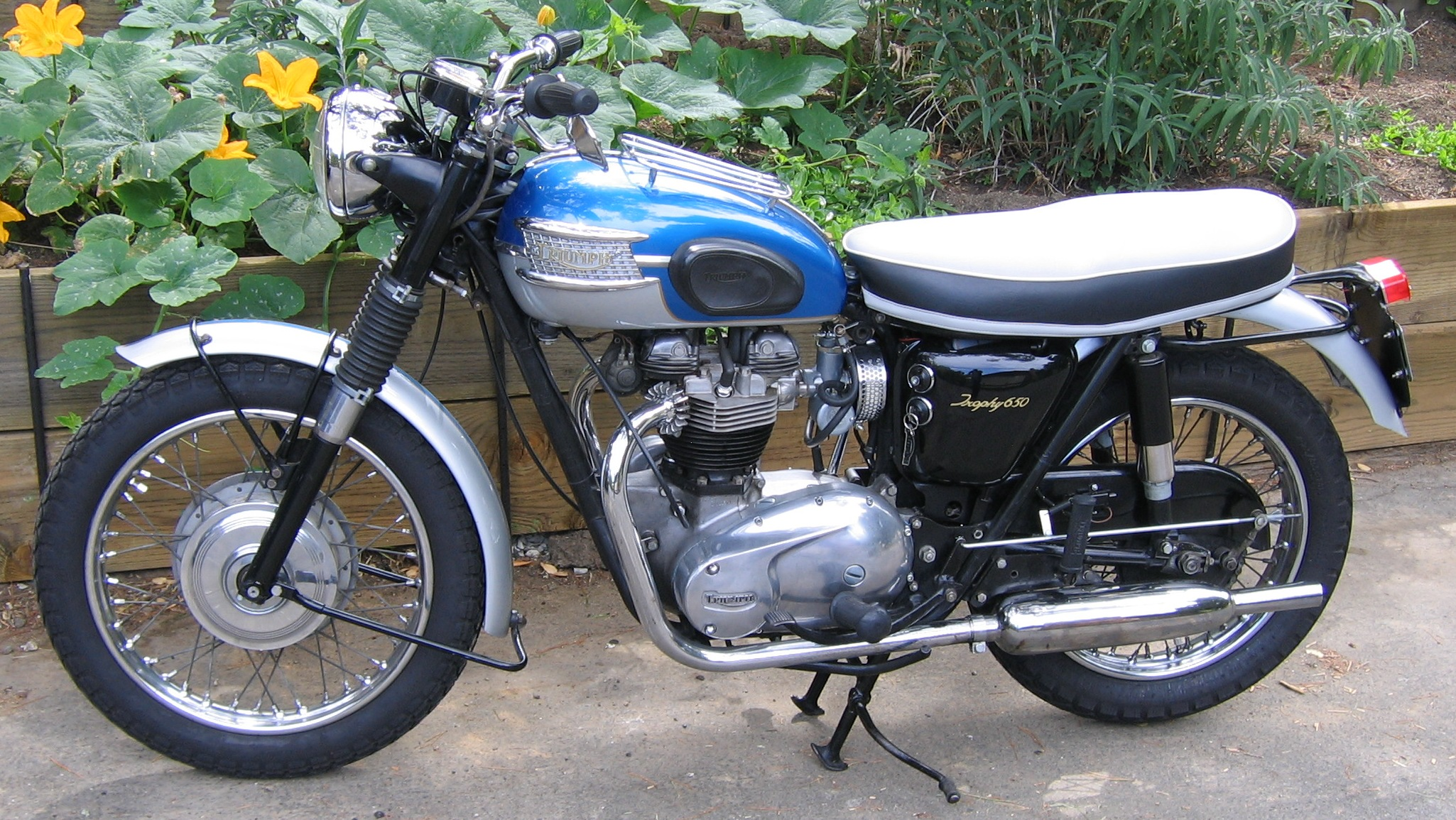
- Manufacturer: Triumph
- Also called: 'Desert Sled'
- Production: 1956–1973
- Predecessor: TR5
- Successor: TR7 Tiger
- Engine: 649 cc (39.6 cu in) four-stroke, parallel-twin
- Compression ratio: 8.5/9:1
- Power: 34–46 bhp (25–34 kW) @ 6,500 rpm (claimed)
- Transmission: 4-speed (5-TR6RV)
- Wheelbase: 55 in (140 cm)
- Dimensions: L: 84 in (214 cm); W: 27½ in (70 cm)
- Seat height: 32.5 in (82.5 cm)
- Weight: 365 lb (166 kg) (dry)
- Fuel capacity: 3 gal / 4 gal
- Related: T120 Triumph Bonneville

The TR6 Trophy is a motorcycle that was made by Triumph, in Meriden, from 1956 to 1973, when it was replaced by the five-speed 750-cc Triumph Tiger TR7V. During this time, it was a successful model, particularly in the US. The competition variant, popularly known as the "desert sled", won numerous competitions throughout the late 1950s and 1960s. Steve McQueen's fondness for the model is well known, as is his participation in the 1964 ISDT on a TR6 Trophy.

== Background ==
The genesis of the model came with the introduction of the 650-cc Thunderbird Model in 1950. This was released to meet the demand for higher-capacity motorcycles, particularly from the United States, Triumph's largest export market. In 1954, the T110 model was introduced, a higher performance version of the Thunderbird. The success of these models and the 500-cc TR5 Trophy led to the creation of a 650-cc TR6 Trophy model. The TR6 was developed and produced specifically for the US market, in particular, California desert racing.

== Pre-unit models ==
The model was introduced in 1956 and named the TR6 Trophy-bird, borrowing its name from the Thunderbird model. The model used the same engine as the T110, but with the new "Delta" alloy cylinder head. The cast iron barrel was retained, but painted silver. The engine used 8.5:1 compression ratio and developed 42 bhp. The power delivery made the mount ideal for off-road competition, for which the model is well known. The bike sported a 'siamese' (two-into-one) exhaust system and a 7-inch front brake. Another feature taken from the TR5 was the quick-detachable headlamp, which was ideal for bikes ridden to competitive events and back again. This used a multipin connector which plugged into the bottom of the headlamp shell.

For 1957, the front brake was enlarged to 8 inches. The TR6 was now fitted with a Lucas Red Label Competition Magneto as standard. This was the first year of the "Harmonica" tank badge. For the 1959 model year, the Trophy was offered in two variants, the TR6/A and TR6/B. The TR6/A was the roadster model with low pipes and the TR6/B was the high-piped street-scrambler. After Edward Turner, the fabled Triumph designer, witnessed the death of a young rider on a TR6, at the 1960 Big Bear Run, due to frame failure, it immediately received a stronger steering head. For 1961, the "Trophy-Bird" name was replaced with simply "Trophy". The home model was named the TR6, whereas the US export models were named TR6C for the competition model and TR6R for the road model. Ruby Red and Silver were used for all models. For 1962, the US models were renamed TR6SR and TR6SC. Introduced in 1962 and offered through 1966 was the TR6SS model, which sported a two-into-one exhaust, but was otherwise similar to the road model. The TR6SS used the cheaper K2F magneto rather than the competition K2FC used previously.

== Unit construction, before oil-in-frame models ==
Like the other 650-cc models, the Trophy gained unit construction in 1963. Coil ignition replaced the magneto.

 On the west coast desert racing become very popular and Johnson Motors, the Triumph distributor for the western states communicated with the Triumph Meridan manufacturing Plant for a desert spec bike, that had improved suspension, Dunlop Universal Trails tires, different gear ratios (17 tooth drive sprocket), an ET ignition with no battery, no lights, and a high pipe exhaust with no mufflers.    Similar to the short track T120C TT Specials,  these would later be commonly called a "Desert Sled" and designated as the model TR6SC Trophy Special. The TR6SC Trophy Special bikes were produced in small numbers (255 units in 1965, other years see dispatch records) specifically for the California desert racing scene.

For 1964, the bike received stronger front forks, which improved handling. The TR6SC model gained a bit more fame in 1964 as Steve McQueen(actor/part time racer)represented team U.S.A. Competed in the International Six Day Trials (I.S.D.T.)riding a 1964 TR6SC in East Germany.

In 1965, a locating pin for finding top dead center was added to allow timing without the use of a dial gauge.

In 1966, a new tear drop tank was introduced. This new slim line tank held less fuel and did not have a parcel grid. Along with the new design, a new tank badge was re-styled from the "Harmonica" style to the "Eyebrow".

Early 66 TR6SC Trophy Special models ordered by Johnson Motors for the west coast were equipped with alloy fenders no running lights and the exhaust was on the left side with no mufflers. These were still designated TR6SC, but starting in early part of 1966 Triumph dropped the models TR6SC and TR6SR, and the new models were now TR6C and TR6R. The TR6R was relatively the same as the previous SR model, but the TR6C now came standard with running lights, and had high level, left side exhaust pipes with mufflers, steel painted fenders and included a speedometer standard. This street-able version is also referred to as the east coast set up as Tri-cor was the east coast distributor and typically had ordered their TR6SC bikes with all the running lights and street trim. The electrics changed to 12 volts, and a bigger 6-pint oil tank was added. The front brake drum was redesigned to allow a larger braking surface.[10]

For 1967, the TR6 received some engine changes. Compression was lowered to 9:1. and Bonneville exhaust valves and camshaft were adopted, resulting in a 5-bhp increase. This year was the beginning of the shift to unified threads. The TR6C now got twin high pipes on the left side with mufflers.

The twin leading shoe brake was adopted in 1968. This year had the introduction of the Amal Concentric carburettor. The TR6R was the "Sport" version with low pipes, and the TR6C was the "Trophy Special" with high pipes and folding footpegs. The TR6C Trophy Special was built at the request of Triumph's sole US distributor at the time, Johnson Motors in southern California, as a way to target the growing number of desert riders. It was fitted with Dunlop Trials Universal block-tread tires and was the model referred to as the "Desert Sled".

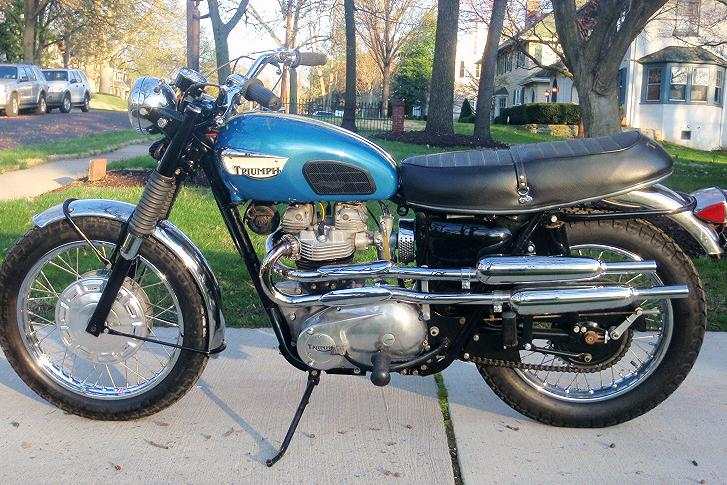
1968 650-cc TR6C Triumph Trophy

The TR6 and TR6R were renamed Tiger for 1969, leaving the TR6C model with the Trophy name. The front brake used a modified actuating lever to avoid snagging of the cable on the front mudguard. Other changes included the larger RM21 alternator and twin Windtone horns. The signature parcel grid was finally dropped for all models.

The last year before the 'oil-in-frame' was adopted was 1970. The exhausts on the TR6C received the "barbecue grill" heat shields.

== Oil-in-frame models ==
In 1971, the TR6R Tiger and TR6C Trophy adopted the P39 frame like the other 650 models. The twin high pipes were retained on the left side. The main improvement over the previous models was the handling, helped by the stronger frame and improved front forks. However, many problems occurred with these new models. The oil capacity was reduced, causing the engine to run hot and the new 'conical' hub front brake required frequent adjustment to avoid fade. The new electrics proved unreliable. Mid-year changes attempted to correct these problems. For 1972, a five-speed was offered as an option, thus creating the TR6RV and TR6CV models. The TR6 model ended in 1973 when it was replaced by the 750-cc TR7 model.

== Police models ==
Before using the Trophy, UK police forces successfully deployed Speed Twin and Thunderbird models. The Trophy version, codenamed the TR6P, carried the model name "Saint" (Stop Anything In No Time). These had a special petrol tank which typically accommodated a PYE radio telephone. It had panniers, a fairing or leg shields. These were sold between 1967 and 1973. The factory varied the specification slightly according to the needs of the individual police force.

A rare TR6SS model was produced for the US police. It is not known if these were ever used for police duties. In 1967, Triumph marketed the Saint model to the US public as a replacement for the beloved but discontinued Thunderbird model.

The Australian Army evaluated a pair of 1971 TR6R motorcycles for military police use, which were not selected. These were fitted with a handlebar fairing, hard panniers and crash bars. These bikes carried registration numbers 95369 and 95371. The Suzuki GS400 was eventually selected.

== Model production quantities ==
Listed here are the production quantities for the various models for each year.

Model	55	56	57	58	59	60	61	62	63	64	65	66	67	68	69	70	71	72	73
TR6	1	1678	1691	1691	1254	1221					1220	637	262	357	377	682			
TR6B						402													
TR6C							310			192		543	2042	1573	2772	1880	3056	1150	
TR6CV																		2	
TR6P													570	977	852	1323	154	752	25
TR6R							1108			963		1529	4706	2673	4900	6246	7527	3607	
TR6RV																	1	2047	122
TR6SR										478	922	1631							
TR6SS								1266	1685	447	182	83							
TR6SC										60	346	260							
Totals	1	1678	1691	1691	1254	1623	1418	1266	1685	2140	2670	4683	7580	5580	8091	10131	10468	7558	147

== Competition ==
Listed here are all known competition wins with the TR6 Trophy.

Year	Event	Winner(s)
1956	Big Bear Run (Open Class)	Bill Postel (1st), Bud Ekins, Alvin Cox
1956	ISDT (750cc Class)	John Giles
1956	Catalina Grand Prix (Open Class)	Bill Postel
1957	Big Bear Run (Open Class)	Bud Ekins
1957	Catalina Grand Prix (Open Class)	Bob Sandgren
1957	Greenhorn Enduro	Eddie Day
1957	California State TT Championship	Ed Kretz Jr.
1957	California State Scrambles Championship	Dick Dorrestyne
1957	AMA Scrambles National Championship	Bud Ekins
1957	AMA National Hare and Hound Championship	Buck Smith
1958	ISDT (750cc Class)	John Giles
1958	Big Bear Run (Open Class)	Roger White
1958	Catalina Grand Prix (Open Class)	Bob Sandgren
1958	Peoria TT (80cu.in. Class)	Dick Dorrestyne
1958	California State Hare and Hound Championship	Bud Ekins
1958	AMA National Hare and Hound Championship	Buck Smith
1959	Big Bear Run	Bud Ekins
1959	Greenhorn Enduro	Buck Smith
1959	East Coast Scrambles Championship	Jim Hayes
1960	Southern 500	Jim Hayes
1962	ISDT (750cc Class)	Bud Ekins
1962	Hi-Mountain 200-mile (320 km) Enduro	Al Rodgers
1963	Greenhorn Enduro	Mike Konle
1963	AMA Cross Country Championship	Eddie Mulder
1964	ISDT (750cc Class)	John Giles
1964	Greenhorn Enduro	Buck Smith
1964	Corriganville Grand Prix	Eddie Mulder
1965	Hi-Mountain Enduro	Eddie Day
1965	AMA Cross Country Championship	Ron Nelson
1965	Corriganville Grand Prix	Eddie Mulder
1965	Stone Mountain Enduro	Leroy Taylor
1965	Greenhorn Enduro	Jim Burleson
1966	Iowa State TT Championship	Dick Schmidt
1966	Hare Scrambles National Championship	Dick Vick
1967	Barstow to Vegas 150-mile (240 km) desert race	Dusty Coppage
1970	Barstow to Vegas 150-mile (240 km) desert race	Mike Burke
1970	World Championship Hare and Hound	Bob Ferro

== Steve McQueen and the 1964 International Six Day Trials ==
In 1964, the US ISDT team, including the Ekins brothers and Steve McQueen travelled to East Germany. Brand new TR6SC and T100SC models were collected from Meriden for the competition. Cliff Coleman achieved third place in the up to 750 cc class and Dave Ekins gained fifth place in the 500 cc. Bud Ekins and Steve McQueen both crashed on the third day, Ekins with a broken ankle. The Steve McQueen bike has been rediscovered and is now owned by Sean and Catherine Kelly of Johnson Motors.

== Appearance in The Great Escape ==
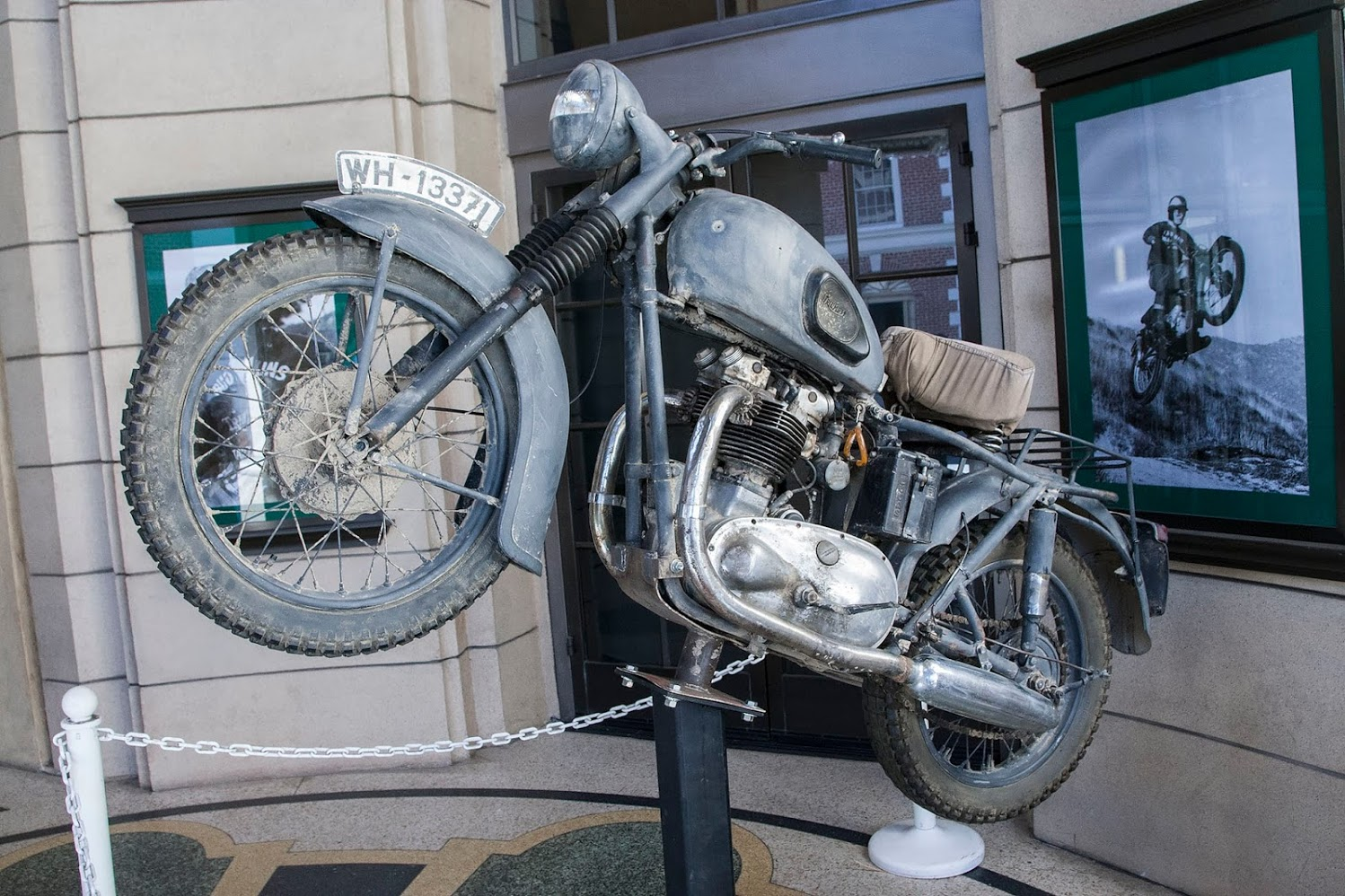
Replica of the motorcycle used by Ekins for stunts in the film The Great Escape.

The motorcycles used during chase scene in film The Great Escape were 1961 Triumph TR6 Trophy models disguised as German BMW R75 motorcycles. The star of the movie, Steve McQueen, did much of the riding for the film himself, although Bud Ekins performed the famous jump scene as McQueen's stunt double. Pin-striper and artist Von Dutch converted the motorcycles for the movie while working at Ekins' shop.
