= Triumph Tiger 100 =

British motorcycle

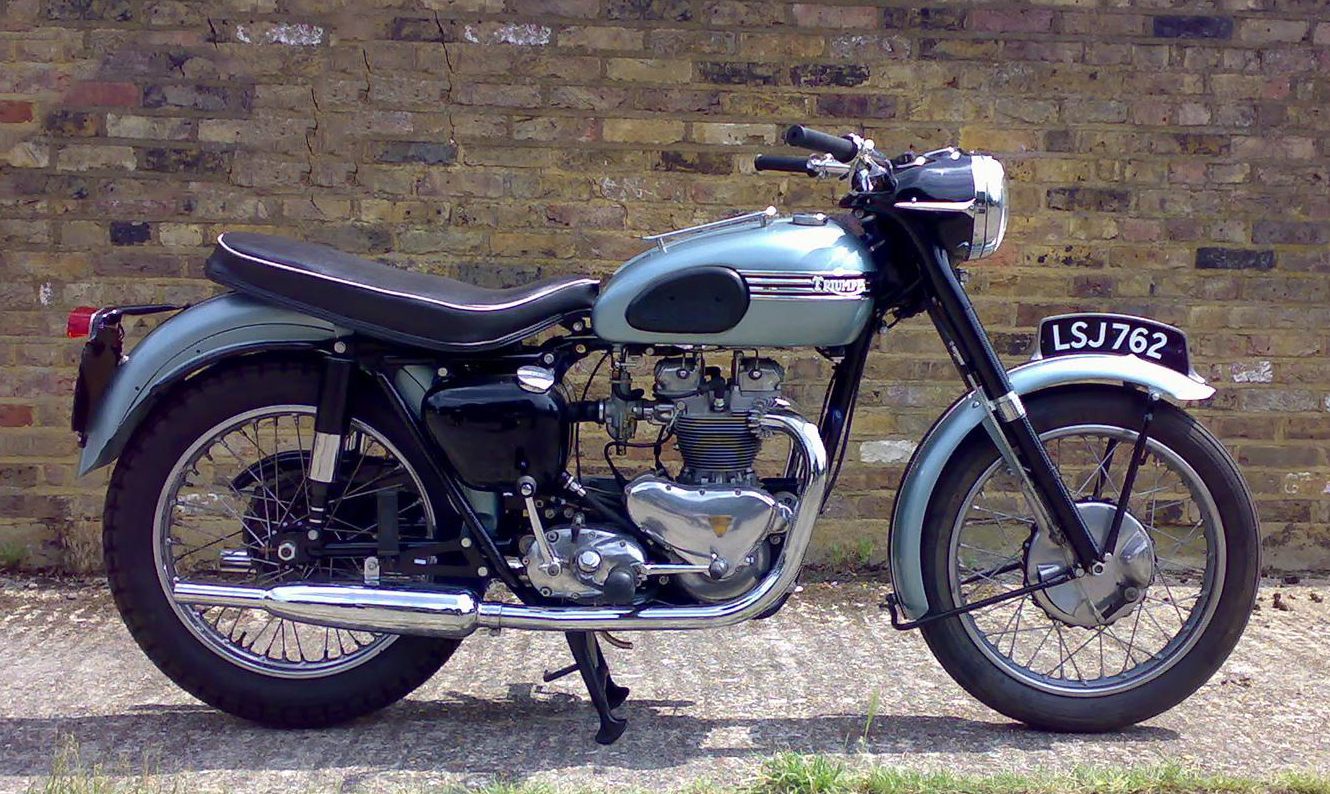
- Manufacturer: Triumph
- Production: 1939–1940, 1946–1973
- Class: Standard
- Engine: 498 cc (30.4 cu in) 360° parallel twin OHV four-stroke
- Bore / stroke: 63 mm × 80 mm (2.5 in × 3.1 in)
- Transmission: 4-speed manual / chain
- Wheelbase: 55 inches (140 cm)

The Tiger 100 (T100) was a standard motorcycle first made by the British motorcycle company Triumph in 1939. Production ceased when the Triumph factory was destroyed by German bombing in 1940 during World War 2, but recommenced in 1946. Several variants were manufactured until 1973.

== Development ==
=== Pre-war production ===
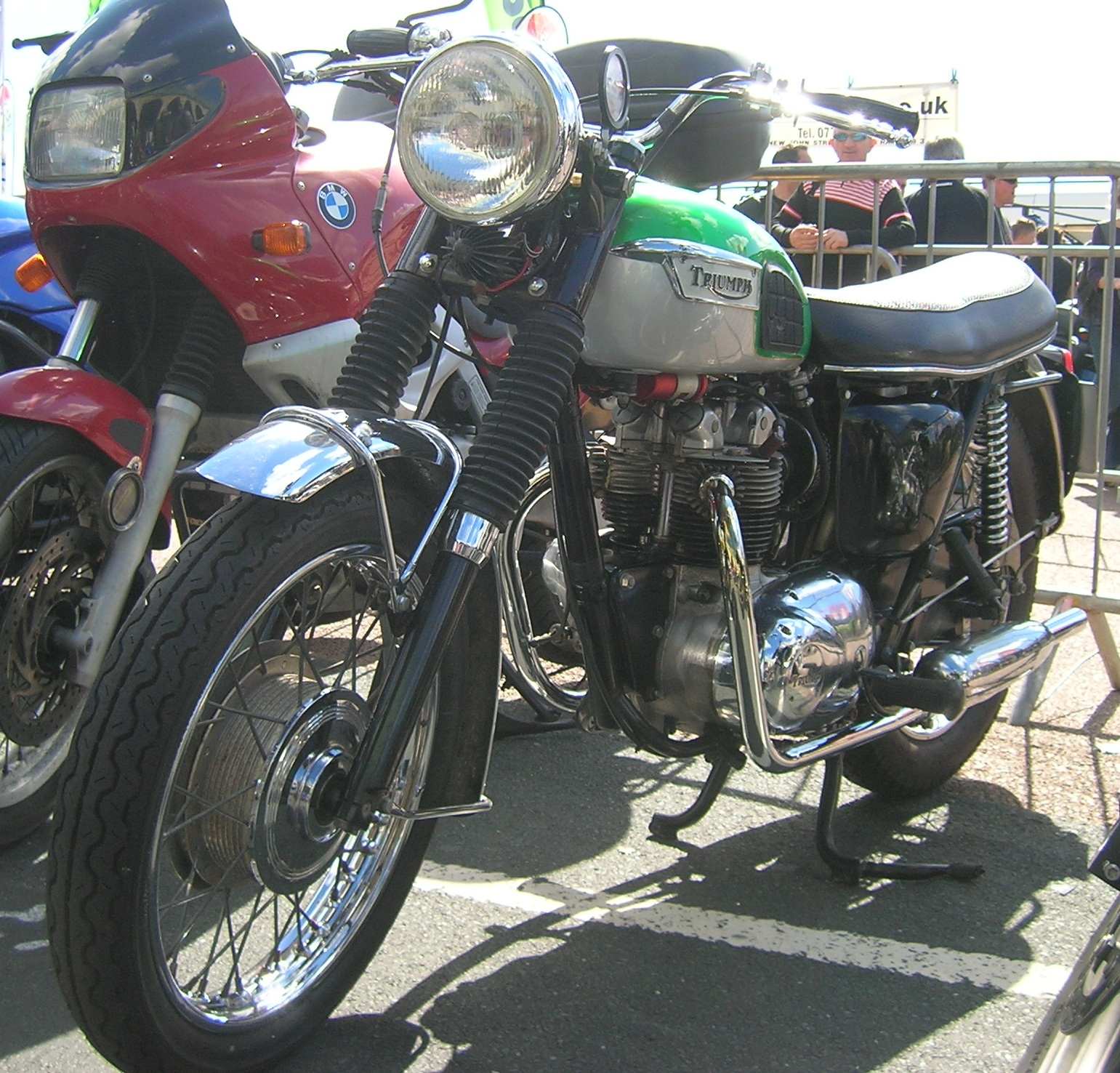
Late 1960s Triumph Tiger 100

With the sales success of the Triumph Speed Twin, Edward Turner, Triumph's motorcycle designer, looked further into developing the potential of the new parallel twin motor. The lighter and more powerful Tiger 100 was developed as a sports enthusiasts' machine, and as with previous models the "100" referred to its claimed maximum speed in miles per hour (mph).

Technical changes over the Speed Twin included forged alloy pistons, a very early use of the technology. The cylinders were forged in a single casting and held in place by eight studs, instead of the Speed Twin's six. The Tiger 100 featured a single Amal carburetor, possible thanks to the 360-degree firing interval of the two cylinders. Finished in silver and costing £5 more, new features included a larger fuel tank and detachable silencers. Early production bikes came with rigid frames and girder front ends. The motorcycle was painted silver with black pin-striping.

In March 1939, Triumph came up with an unorthodox launch of the new Tiger 100. Using a Tiger 100 and a Speed Twin straight from dealers showrooms, endurance was tested with a run of over 1,800 miles (2,900 km) from John o' Groats to Land's End in Cornwall then to the Brooklands circuit for six hours of continuous high-speed laps, where riders Ivan Wicksteed and David Whitworth averaged 78.5 miles per hour (126.3 km/h) with a final lap of 88.5 miles per hour (142.4 km/h), winning Triumph the Maudes Trophy. The Tiger 100's sporting pretensions were later further proven through Freddie Clarke's 1939 lap record at Brooklands of 118.02 miles per hour (189.93 km/h) on a bored-out 503 cc Tiger 100.

=== Factory destroyed in 1940 ===
The Triumph works was destroyed by German bombers on the night of 14 November 1940 - along with much of the city of Coventry bringing production of the Tiger 100 to an end until after the war.

=== Post-war production ===
When Triumph recovered and began production again at Meriden the Tiger 100 re-appeared with the new telescopic fork. In 1951 it gained a new close finned alloy cylinder barrel and factory race kits for independent racers. In 1953 a fully race-kitted model, the Tiger 100C, was available although only 560 were made.

1954 saw the first swinging-arm rear suspension models and the Tiger 100 was developed year on year alongside the other models in the range. The Tiger was the sports bike of the Triumph marque and was extensively used for racing. Racing modification included a solo seat. 1959 was the last of the pre-units (separate engine/gearbox) and in 1960 it was completely redesigned in the new 'unit' style as the T100A. A long line of T100SS, T100C, T100R and others appeared during the sixties in the UK and export (mainly US) markets culminating in the Daytona variants which remained in production until 1973. The historic Tiger name was revived by the new Hinckley Triumph company in 1993 (see Triumph Tiger 900 (T400)).

== Bob Dylan crash ==
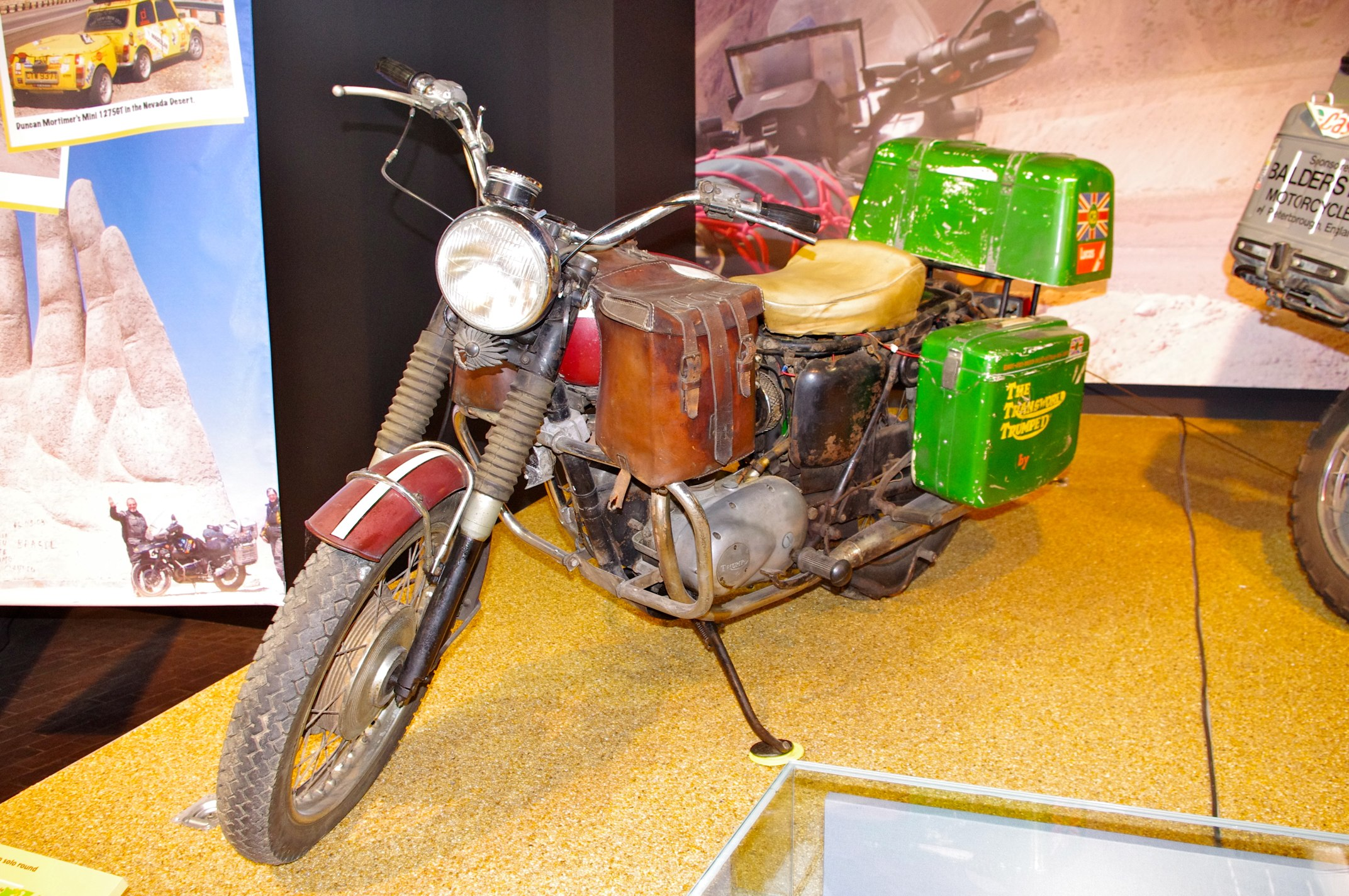
Ted Simon's Triumph Tiger 100 "Jupiter"

On 29 July 1966, Bob Dylan crashed his Tiger 100SS motorcycle on a road near his home in Woodstock, New York, throwing him to the ground. In the wake of his accident, Dylan withdrew from public and did not tour again for eight years.

== Jupiter's Travels ==
Ted Simon rode a police-specification 1973 Tiger 100 T100P around the world, starting that year. In his book Jupiter's Travels, he documents how the Meriden factory was undergoing a sit-in and as a result his motorcycle was hastily assembled.

== See also ==
- List of motorcycles of the 1940s
- List of motorcycles of the 1950s
- List of Triumph motorcycles
