= Triumph T140W TSS =

British motorcycle

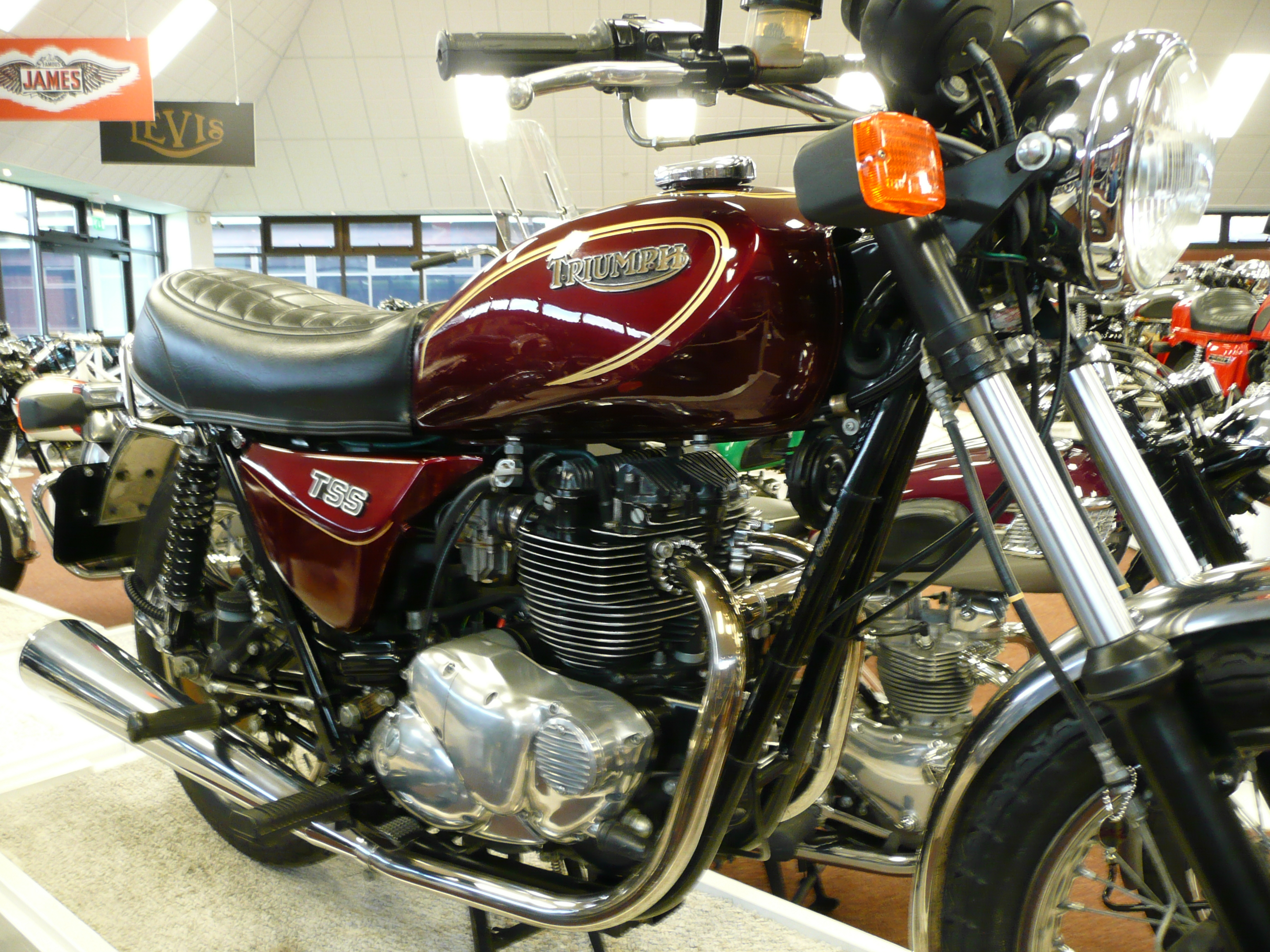
- 1983 TSS-AV
- Manufacturer: Triumph
- Production: 1982–1983
- Engine: 749 cc (45.7 cu in) twin

The T140W TSS was the last motorcycle model made by Triumph Engineering at their Meriden factory.

== Development history ==
Designed to appeal to the US market, the TSS had an eight valve Weslake Engineering cylinder head developed by Triumph's Brian Jones from a 1978/9 design originally commissioned from Nourish Racing of Rutland following 1960s designs for the 650cc twins by the Rickman Brothers.

The crank was a fully machined single forging with increased big end diameter making it much stiffer and better-balanced and producing one of the smoothest running motorcycles in the Triumph range. The head had smaller valves set at a steeper angle (30°). Recesses in the pistons allowed a 10:1 compression ratio.

UK models had a pair of 34 mm Amal MkII carburetors while the export models had Bing constant velocity carburetors. Other changes from the standard T140E included offset connecting rods, steel-linered alloy barrels, a strengthened swinging arm, and a high output three-phase alternator.

A modified TSS raced by Jon Minonno for Texan Jack Wilson's Big D Triumph dealership achieved outstanding results in the Battle of the Twins races for 1981–1982.

== Specification ==
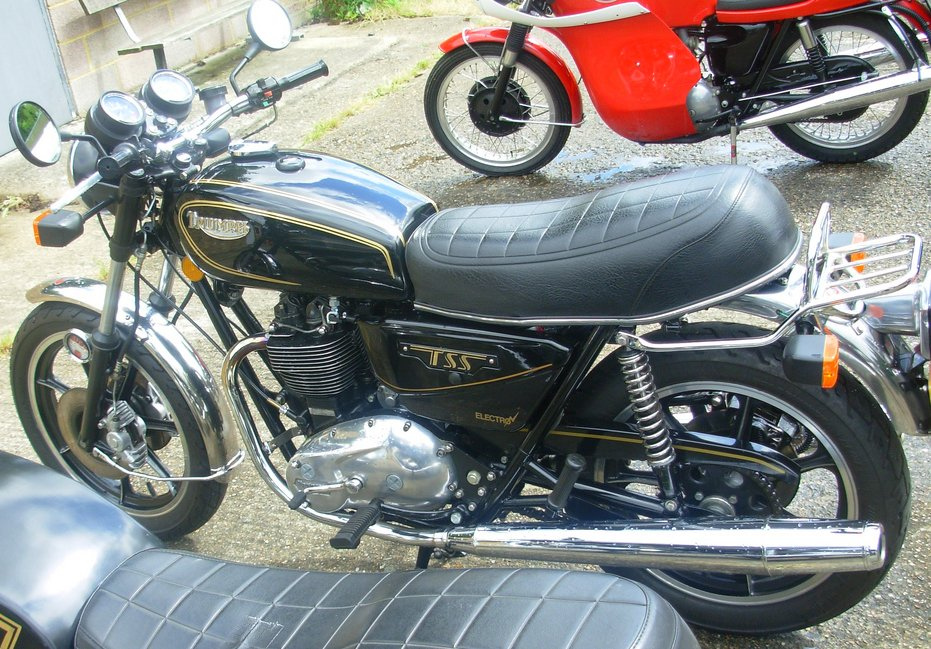
1982 UK/RoW specification Triumph TSS at the London Motorcycle Museum sporting the Morris alloy wheel option but also owner-fitted with some non-standard 1979 parts: Girling rear shock absorbers, handlebar levers and a grabrail with parcel carrier

Launched in 1982 with an electric starter as standard, the all-new top end of the engine featured Cooper rings sealing the 8-valve cylinder head to the barrel. American Morris alloy wheels were an option with dual Automotive Products Lockheed disc brakes upfront as standard. The fins of the black painted engine were polished although, like the Triumph TR65 Thunderbird, many alloy cycle parts that had in the past been bright–polished or chromed were now painted satin black. Mudguards were stainless steel as were the Italian Radaelli rims for the wire-spoked wheel option. The high specification air-oil 'Strada' rear suspension units were supplied by Italian firm Marzocchi. Like the Italian–sourced petrol tank, other OEM components were now from mainland Europe: French Veglia clocks, Italian Paioli petrol taps and German Bumm mirrors, Magura choke lever and ULO direction indicators

Unlike most Triumph models, no USA style with high handlebars and two-gallon tank was officially specified (until the TSX8-see below), all advertised models coming with the Italian four-gallon tank and low handlebars as well as the newly introduced alloy 'dog leg' clutch and front brake levers. The actual version exported to the USA received a black paint scheme with gold-lined red 'wings' along with newly shaped megaphone mufflers and German Bing carburettors. A one-off variant in line with the Triumph Bonneville T140EX Executive was produced for a London dealer, albeit again in gold-lined black, but with the Executive's standard Brealey-Smith 'Sabre' fairing and luggage by Sigma. All TSS were shod with Avon Roadrunner tyres.

Only 112 TSS bikes were actually exported by Triumph, as on 26 August 1983 the factory at Meriden went into voluntary liquidation. It is calculated that 438 TSS units were made in total.

The TSS, particularly the engine, was generally well received by the British and international press although a long term test by Motor Cycle Weekly revealed early cylinder heads to be porous and wet weather braking failure. In an interview in US magazine, Motorcyclist, Meriden's Director of Engineering, Brian Jones revealed that the epoxy coating on the initial cylinder heads supplied by Weslake disguised the porosity problem from their factory testers.

== TSSAV ==
Fitting an eight-valve engine in an anti-vibration frame was first mooted by the factory at the 1981 Earls Court motorcycle show on the prototype super-tourer, TS8-1. Now displayed at the London Motorcycle Museum, the TS8-1 had plastic bodywork by Ian Dyson of contracted stylists, Plastic Fantastic.

For the unrealised 1984 range, the TSS was to have had Meriden's 'Enforcer' anti-vibration frame as standard where the engine was rubber-mounted in a special anti-vibration frame. Styling changes included the adoption of parts from the Triumph T140 TSX model such as the abbreviated rear mudguard albeit in stainless steel and side panels with a TSX-styled TSS badge affixed. These replaced the original side panels which had been extended to cover the Bing carburettor linkages on the USA export models. A plastic 'ducktail' seat unit was mounted above the shortened rear mudguard of the projected 1984 civilian model and rear set footrests, brake and gear shift mechanisms fitted. Police TSS AV retained the standard footrest/control arrangement as well as conventional cycle parts over the ducktail and TSX parts. Due to the height clearance limitations caused by the engine jogging about its rubber mounts within the Enforcer frame, the shorter Amal Mk2 carburettors instead of Bings were fitted.

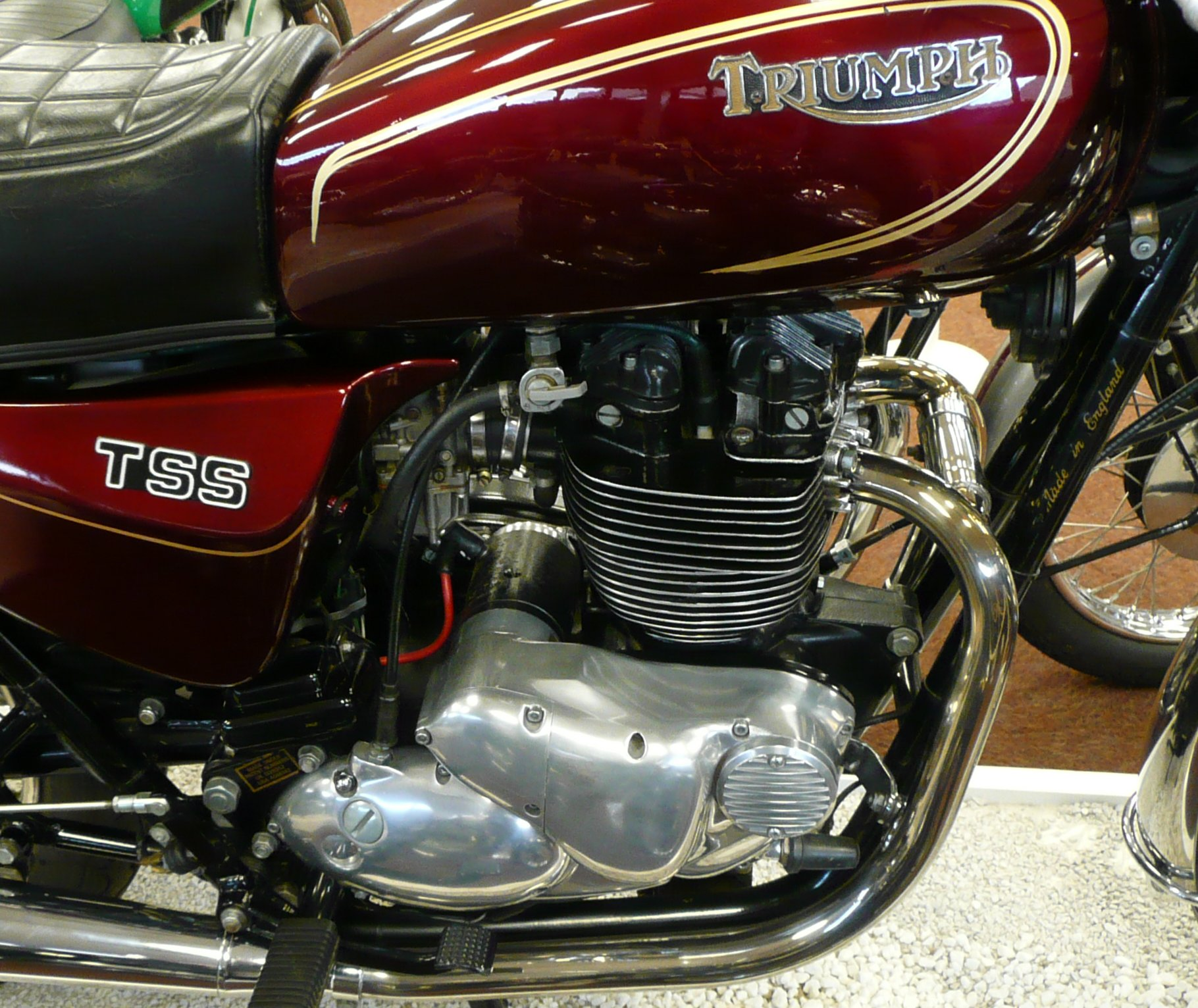
TSS-AV close up

Only three examples of the TSS AV in police and civilian specification were ever made (and one bare frame) including one for the late Chris Buckle, proprietor of former Triumph dealers, Roebucks Motorcycles. Not quite to the envisaged 1984 specification, this was made on 27 June 1983 and is, according to the factory production records held by the Vintage Motor Cycle Club, the last complete Meriden Triumph. This is the pictured burgundy-coloured example now on display at the National Motorcycle Museum in Solihull, West Midlands close to the former factory site. It was factory -fitted with Koni rear suspension units and omitted the 'ducktail' in favour of the conventional rear mudguard arrangement.

== TSX8 ==
Another prototype from the unrealised 1984 range, a TSS engine, with Bings, in Triumph T140 TSX cycle parts was to be marketed as the TSX8, the original four-valve version renamed as the TSX4. Wayne Moulton who designed the TSX, had originally done so with the 8-valve TSS engine in mind.
