= Triumph Tiger Trail =

British motorcycle

Triumph TR7T / TR65T Tiger Trail
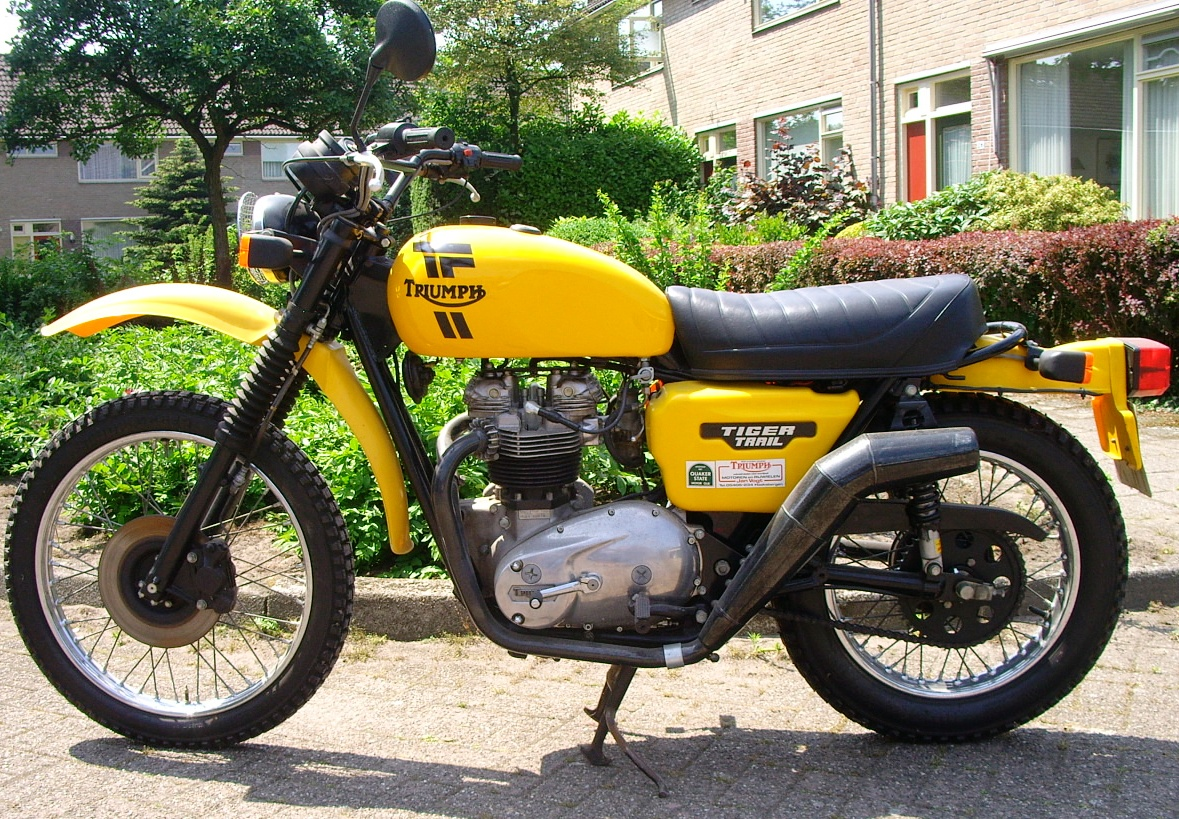
- 1981 Triumph 750 cc TR7T Tiger Trail
- Manufacturer: Triumph
- Production: 1981–1982
- Engine: TR7T : 744cc / TR65T : 649 cc OHV air cooled twin
- Power: TR7T: 40 bhp (30 kW) at 6,500 rpm / TR65T: 35 bhp (26 kW) at 6,500 rpm
- Torque: TR7T: 34 lb⋅ft (46 N⋅m) @ 4,000 rpm / TR65T: 31 lb⋅ft (42 N⋅m) @ 4,000 rpm
- Transmission: 5-speed gearbox to chain final drive
- Wheelbase: 56ins
- Dimensions: L: 88.5ins / 2248mm W: 31.0ins /965mm H: 44ins
- Seat height: 32.5ins / 828mm
- Weight: 383 pounds (174 kg) (dry)
- Fuel capacity: 10.45 L (2.30 imp gal; 2.76 US gal)

The Triumph Tiger Trail was a motorcycle model manufactured by Triumph Motorcycles at the Meriden factory. The Tiger Trail was made from 1981 to 1982 in both 750 cc (TR7T) and 650 cc (TR65T) capacities, and under 180 examples were built. Emission regulations precluded export to the USA but otherwise the model was available to all Triumph's other markets particularly in many British Commonwealth nations and western Europe.

== History ==
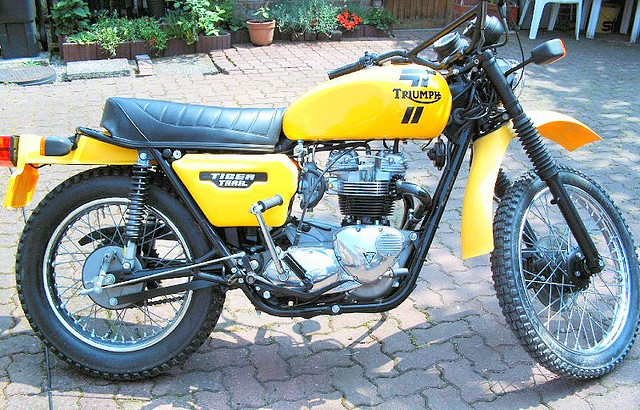
Timing side of new 1981 Triumph TR7T Tiger Trail fitted with much-criticised Avon Mudplugger tyres

Triumph manufactured the Tiger Trail in response to their French importers', C.G.C.I.M., request for a large capacity dual purpose machine to compete with the BMW R80G/S model. The importers had visited Meriden with a prototype based around the Triumph Bonneville T140 which the factory judged too powerful. Instead, Meriden's director of engineering Brian Jones based the proposed model around the 750 cc TR7V Triumph Tiger with its single 30 mm Amal carburettor and electronic ignition by Lucas. Alterations included lowering the compression giving 42 bhp (31 kW) at 6,500 rpm and fitting camshaft profiles from the Triumph Trident. The secondary gearing was also altered by fitting an 18-tooth gearbox sprocket and 47-tooth rear chain sprocket. Overall weight was down 25 lb (11 kg) from the road models to 375 lb (170 kg) dry. To this end, with two exceptions to fulfill a Trinidad police order, no electric start was fitted as standard. A factory decal advised not travelling beyond 80 mph (130 km/h) upon the standard tyres, although top speed was tested as reaching just over 100 mph (160 km/h).

The 750 cc model was first shown by the factory at the 1980 Paris motorcycle show and introduced for the 1981/1982 season. Bike magazine reported that the French importers were to have entered two 750 cc Tiger Trail bikes in the Paris-Dakar Rally. Certainly, French magazine Moto Verte entered and reported upon a 750 cc Tiger Trail in the Paris-Tunis rally and whilst failing to finish, praised the engine feeling only suspension adjustments rather a complete chassis redesign was needed.

Competition success soon came in June 1981 when Tony Beaumont of the Federation of Police Motor Clubs team sponsored by British Petroleum beat BMW R80G/S and Japanese opposition to win the 750 cc and above class of the Rallye des Pyrénées, a tough on/off-road timed race. Triumph exploited this fact both in press advertisements and in a publicity poster featuring their sales manager Bob Haines leaping through the air upon a TR7T, describing it as "The Bike For Adventure". An Englishman, Jez Billing, rode a suitably modified 750 cc Tiger Trail in his around-the-world attempt from 1986 to 1988.

White Tiger Trails were also made for the Gulf Petroleum sponsored Royal Military Police display team. The frames of these white Tigers omitted the pillion footrest brackets to accommodate the new silencer which was of a different box-type design whilst their tanks sported metal badges instead of decals and being of later Italian manufacture, had 'flip-up' petrol caps. The front mudguard also had a perforated lower end.

In their review of the TR7T, Motor Cycle News had suggested that the recently introduced Triumph TR65 Thunderbird's engine was more suitable off-road so it was not surprising that a 650cc version of the Tiger Trail, the TR65T, was introduced for 1982. This was despite opposition from Meriden's non-executive board member and political sponsor Geoffrey Robinson that both this, a proposed 125cc learner motorcycle and the 650cc Triumph TR65 Thunderbird itself would take away sales from the more profitable 750cc range. The co-operative's board stated justification was that sales of the 650cc models were not substitutes for the 750cc range but were instead incremental leading up to the eventual purchase of the larger models. Despite this, both the 750cc and 650cc Tiger Trails were marketed at the same price, the smaller bike justifying this by being to a higher specification with a tachometer and centre stand fitted as standard.

Press reviews of both versions of the bike were generally favourable but with often common criticism particularly of the off-road-biassed Mudplugger tyres' road and wet weather performance, as well as the overall weight, suspension travel off-road, and a too short protective engine guard. In comparison with market rivals, the BMW R80G/S and the Moto Morini Camel, the Tiger Trail did well, German magazine Motorrad judging the 750 cc engine superior and SuperBike placing the 650 cc version second to the Camel off-road (with the BMW R80G/S being third) and second to the BMW on-road. Testing the TR7T, Dutch publication, Motor, adjudged it very comfortable but functional, it's off-road performance 'surprisingly good'; particularly on sand being 'pure pleasure'. SuperBike tested the TR7T, calling it, 'an attractive, alternative, serious dirt bike' and 'a hand-crafted, quality, all-rounder.'

Both models were deleted from general production at the end of 1982 due to lack of demand, popularity only ever having been gained in Australia, Germany and Switzerland. The last TR7T was completed as part of a Ministry of Defence order entering service on 9 August 1982 until 20 April 1989.

== TR7T description ==
With the exception of the aforementioned white military 750 cc Tiger Trail, the model came in one colour only, 'Sunburst Yellow', and featured yellow plastic mudguards and side panels. The petrol tank of the smaller two gallon 'USA' type in the same colour, had a stylised 'T' decal affixed on either side, the first use of main styling decals for Triumph. The tank had two Italian Paioli petrol taps for main and reserve. The 'semi-western' handlebars, braced and fitted with Doherty rubber grips, together with the petrol filler cap were black powder-coated whilst the two-into-one exhaust system and silencer were black chromed.

The tachometer was omitted, its pod being filled with a warning light panel and ignition switch. Braking was by the standard Automotive Products Lockheed 10.25 inch front brake and a newly introduced 7 inch single-leading-shoe rear drum brake. The turn indicators, not featured in the 1981/1982 brochure photo, were black plastic ULO items from Germany who also supplied the rear stoplamp. Also German were the rear view mirrors by Bumm. Rear suspension were Marzocchi 'Euro 74' units from Italy, at 335mm, 22 mm longer than either the standard Girling units or Marzocchi types later fitted to road models. The front suspension was the same as for road models albeit with gaitors fitted as standard and sharing the satin black finish for the range that season.

The front wheel rim was 3.00 x 21 inches and like the rear, a 4.00 x 18 inch item, was a chromed item supplied by the Italian firm, Radaelli, both featuring security bolts and both shod with Avon Mudplugger dual purpose tyres.

The headlamp was smaller than on the road models in size, its bucket finished in satin black and sporting a separate chromed mesh stone guard. The seat was a 3/4 length item, unique to the model. A black-painted bash plate was fitted to the underside of the frame stopping just short of the sump plate. The silencer was a cut-and-shut version of the standard roadster 'barrel' type. The centre stand was an optional item with only a sidestand originally supplied. Pillion footrests, too, were omitted, the high level silencer precluding passengers. Later production models cured this by fitting a wire guard to the silencer and a footrest extended out to clear the same. No passenger grabrail was ever fitted. Rider footrests were short, black-painted metal items that, unlike the roadster models, were not rubber mounted but could fold back against a spring.

== TR65T description ==
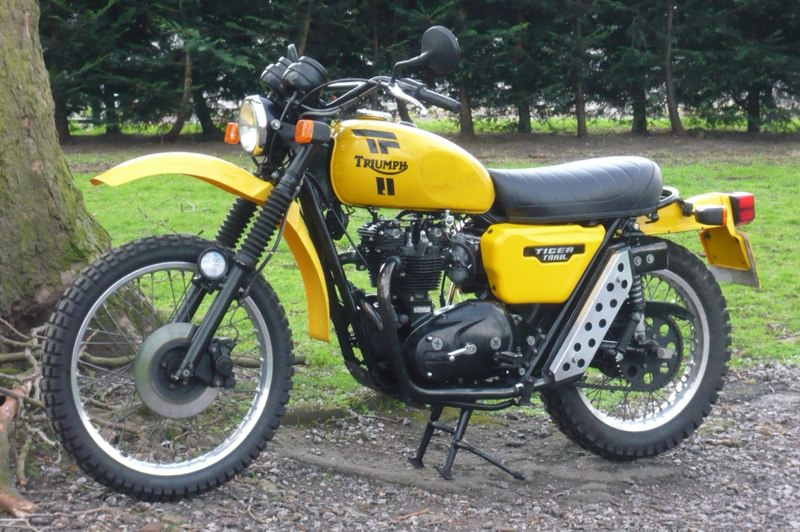
1983 650cc Triumph TR65T Tiger Trail motorcycle

The 650 cc TR65T Tiger Trail came out in early 1982 and was based around the newly introduced Triumph TR65 Thunderbird engine albeit suitably altered for the trail and with electronic ignition.

Whilst the press road test version was finished exactly as per the 750 cc model, the 1982/1983 brochure shows the 650 cc version, again in 'Sunburst Yellow' (Bike also reported a 'Lime Green' colour scheme for the TR65T which only appeared on Triumph's exhibition stand at the 1981 Earls Court Motorcycle show with a perforated sheet alloy guard curved over a TR7T silencer), to have different stylised 'T' tank decals with longer tails, the engine completely finished in satin black, a rectangular box silencer with perforated sheet alloy guard, extended bash plate, 'dog leg' clutch and front brake levers, no headlamp stoneguard, centrestand as standard and the adoption of the roadster's instrumentation with centralised ignition/warning lamp panel and tachometer.

Passenger footpegs on the 1982/3 brochure TR65T (and like the example held by the London Motorcycle Museum), in the absence of the usual subframe footrest brackets (omitted to accommodate the new style muffler/silencer), were instead welded upon the swingarm as on the 1973/4 TR5T Trophy Trail. However, the TR65T press bike supplied to Dirt Bike Rider, Motorcycling, The Biker and SuperBike did not feature this or any cosmetic change from the TR7T. Ex-International Six Days Trials Gold Medallist, Ken Heanes, reported on a TR65T for Dirt Bike Rider (which erroneously referred to it as a TR7T in their by-line to the piece), rating it very highly as a competition machine.

== Sources ==
- Roy Bacon Triumph T140 Bonneville & Derivatives (Niton press)
- Harry Woolridge Triumph Trophy & Tiger Bible (Veloce Press)
