= Brian Jones (motorcycle designer) =

Brian Edward Jones
- Born: 31 August 1928; Gloucester, United Kingdom
- Died: 4 March 2001 (aged 72); Coventry
- Occupation: Motorcycle designer
- Spouse(s): Connie, Mabel
- Children: Katherine, Rachel, Meg

Brian Jones was a motorcycle designer and engineer born in Gloucester, United Kingdom in 1928. Notable for his contribution to the original design of the Triumph Bonneville, he died in Coventry, on 4 March 2001.

== Career ==
Brian Jones was born in Gloucester and began his career in the motorcycle industry with an apprenticeship with Douglas Motorcycles in 1951 before moving to the English Midlands to work with the BSA company who were the biggest motorcycle manufacturers in the world at the time. He also worked at the Norton Motorcycles factory where he decided to become a motorcycle designer. Norton's Managing Director at the time was legendary designer Bert Hopwood and the company was controlled by Associated Motor Cycles.

Leaving a struggling AMC/Norton, Jones moved to Triumph where he worked with Doug Hele on the 650 cc Triumph Bonneville T120. Watching the Thruxton 500 endurance race for production motorcycles he saw the factory rider Percy Tait come into the pits after an hour on the track and plunge his blistered hands into a bucket of water. Jones worked with Hele on improvements to the chassis which resulted in a victory in the 750 cc Production Class at the 1969 Isle of Man TT.

In 1975, the Triumph factory, with a government loan, was taken over by the workers after the new owners, NVT, had wanted to close it down. Jones had by then left to work for Lockheed. The then-chairman of the workers' co-operative, Dennis Crowder-Johnson asked him to return to Triumph, however, and Jones came back to help improve their only product, Triumph's 750 cc motorcycle, consisting of the Triumph Bonneville T140V and Triumph Tiger TR7V models. As Director of Engineering, he ensured the Bonneville's continued export to the vital USA market by making it compliant with ever-stricter emissions laws (the T140E), (finally) introduced electric starting (the T140ES) and, with Bernard Hooper's design, developed an anti-vibration framed model (T140AV).

Jones also developed variants such as the economy 650 cc Triumph TR65 Thunderbird, the dual-purpose Triumph Tiger Trail (TR7T,) the eight-valve Triumph T140W TSS with Weslake and with Triumph Motorcycle America's Wayne Moulton, the Triumph T140 TSX. Jones was also involved in the development of the prototype 900 cc water-cooled, double-overhead-cam (DOHC) 'Diana' twin that the struggling co-operative hoped would attract outside investment in a last-ditch attempt to save their business. However, by 1983 the co-operative closed and Triumph was then bought by John Bloor with full motorcycle production of a new range only restarting in 1991 at Hinckley.

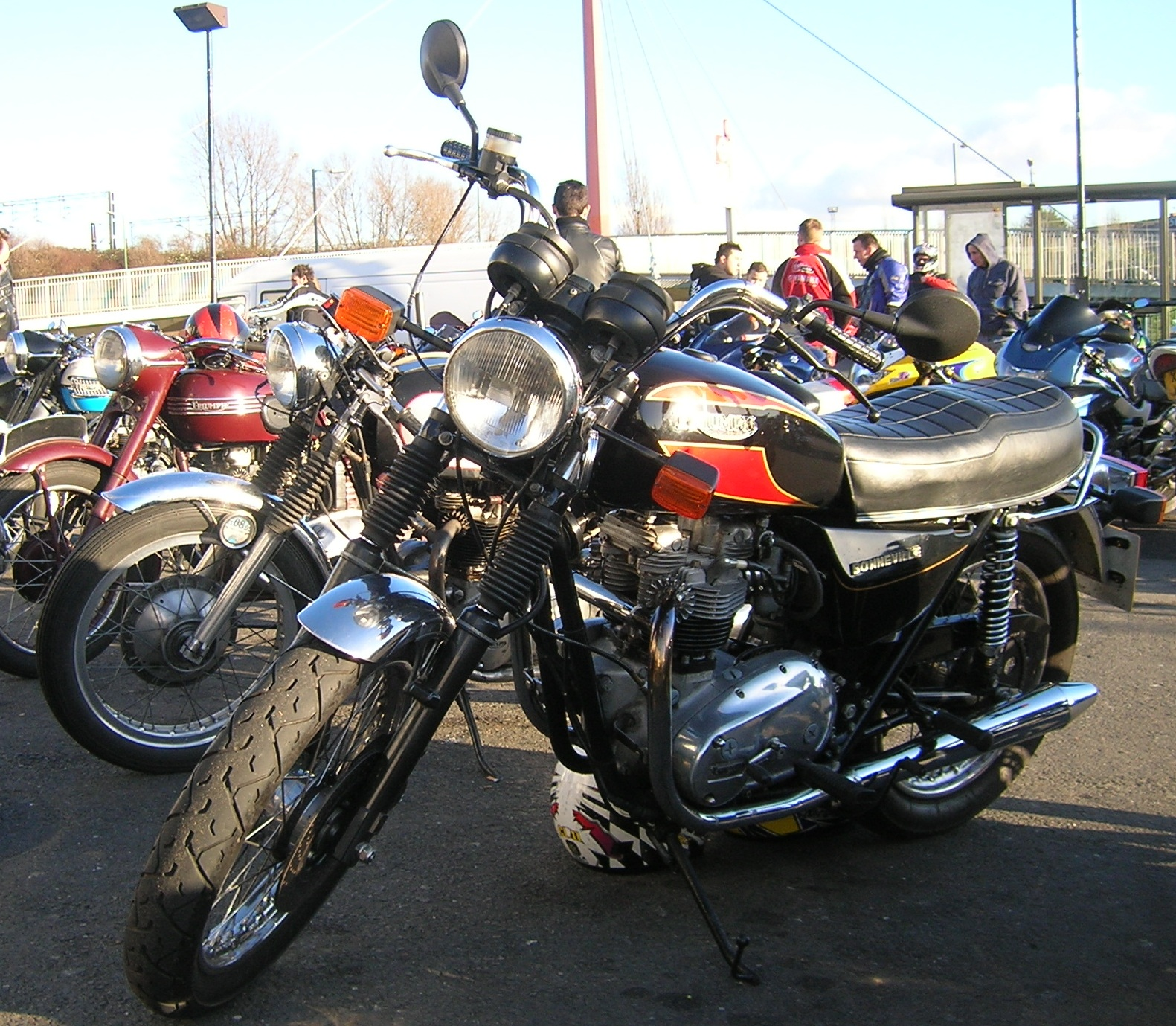
Triumph T140 Bonneville built under licence by LF Harris with significantly more Italian and German component parts but here also with aftermarket silencers.

In the meantime, Les Harris of Newton Abbot was licensed by Bloor to build the Bonneville at his works in Devon and recruited Brian Jones to oversee the new operation. Production was limited by the inability to export to the USA due to prohibitive product liability insurance rates. As well as the Bonneville production, Jones designed a 500 cc Rotax-engined Matchless single-cylinder model that did well in the UK but was never exported in volume. Bonneville production at Newton Abbot ended in 1988 and although the Matchless was successful Jones did not want to work in Harris's spares business and moved to a new incarnation of the Norton company at Shenstone, Staffordshire.
