= Austel Motorcycles =

Austel Motorcycles were produced by Austel Engineering of Maidenhead, Berkshire, England between 1985 and 1991. It was the idea of engineer/designer Chris Castell to use a Mini car engine in a motorcycle to produce a long-lasting, economic to ride and service motorcycle. The Austel name was derived from the first letters of the Austin (Mini engine) and the last letters of Castell with the second l dropped.

The first Austel 1000 MK1 prototype was built in 1981 for Chris's own use, and this was closely by the MK2 which was built for local businessman John Kemp. These bikes had 1000 cc Mini engines with foot-operated automatic gear boxes (including reverse), side-mounted radiators, chain drive, Yamaha alloy wheels, Austel leading link forks and were named Lotec due to the simplicity of design.

The natural design progression from the Lotec was the Pullman combination motorcycle. The heavy but economic Mini engine lent itself to having a sidecar attached for long-distance touring. The first Austel Pullman prototype appeared in 1987 with a Mini 850 cc engine, shaft drive, solenoid-operated handlebar-mounted gear change, drum brakes, Austel 8-spoke steel wheels and leading link anti dive front forks. The production models were revised to have 1300 cc engines, full duplex frame with box-section swing arm, twin front disc brakes with single rear disc and a front-mounted radiator. With the sidecar attached it was then possible to have a manual gearbox with hand gear stick although this meant the gear selection was rotated 90 degrees due to the engine being positioned longitudinally in the frame. The sidecar choice was down to the customer and could be fitted with a fuel tank in the boot for greater capacity and a dummy tank on the bike that could be removed easily for engine maintenance. No two Austel motorcycles were ever the same due to design developments and customer requirements.

Excluding the prototypes, it is believed that 11 Austel production motorcycles were made between 1985 and 1991, ten before the death of Chris Castell and one from parts afterwards. Production machines have the following frame number configuration; AUS85(Austel start of production)/production number/L or P(Lotec or Pullman)/year of manufacturer.

There is an Austel 1000 cc Lotec motorcycle on display at the London Motorcycle Museum.
