= Triumph TR65 Thunderbird =

British motorcycle

TR65 Thunderbird/Daytona 600
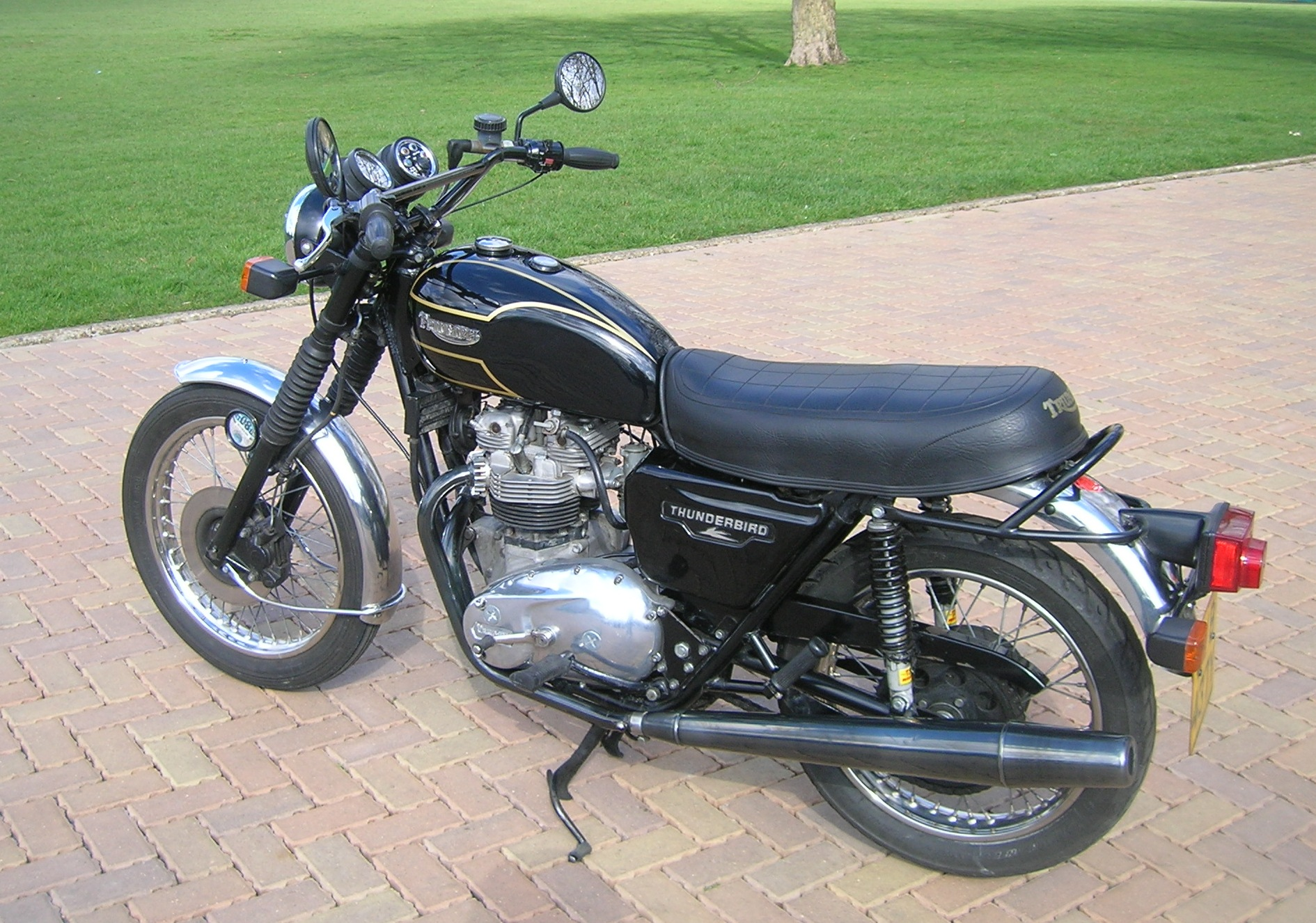
- Manufacturer: Triumph
- Production: 1981–1983
- Engine: 649 cc (39.6 cu in) OHV air-cooled twin
- Power: 42 bhp (31 kW) at 6,500 rpm
- Torque: 37 lb⋅ft (50 N⋅m) @ 5,500 rpm
- Transmission: 5-speed manual, chain final drive
- Weight: 395 lb (179 kg) (dry)
- Fuel capacity: 10.5 L (2.3 imp gal; 2.8 US gal)

The Triumph TR65 Thunderbird is a motorcycle made by the Triumph worker's co-operative at the Meriden factory from 1981 to 1983. The TR65 was a reintroduction of the Triumph Thunderbird model name first used on the original 6T Thunderbird of 1949. A short stroke model, the Daytona 600 was designed in 1983 but not produced.

== Development ==
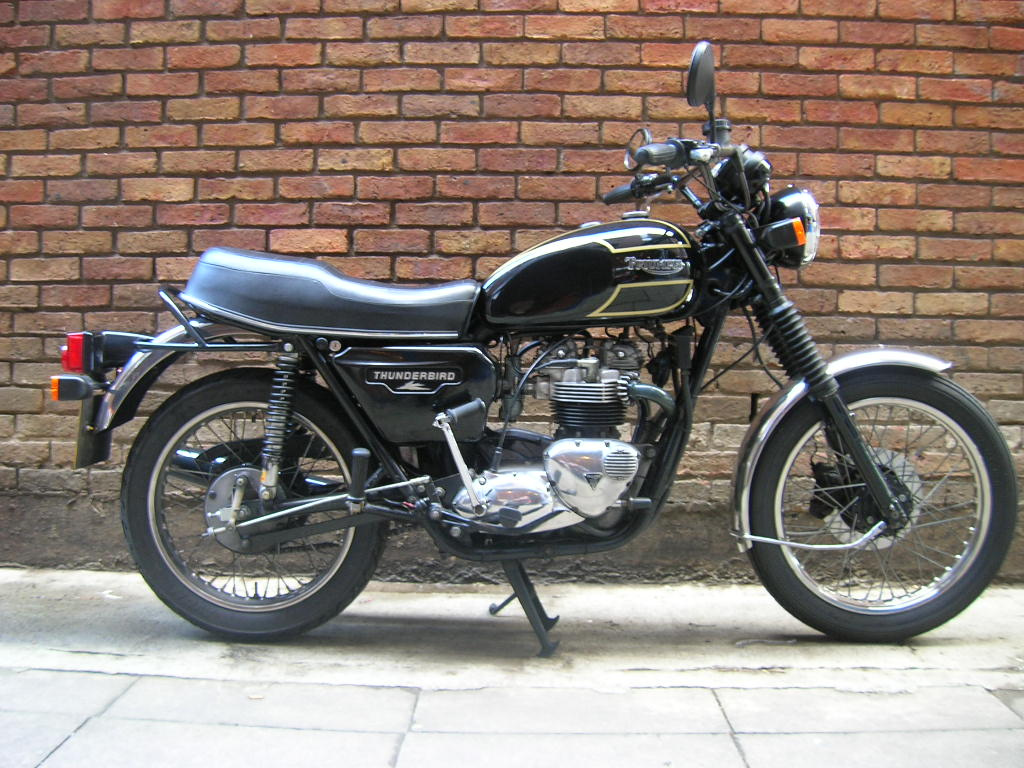

The TR65 was a 650 cc parallel twin with a short-stroke version of the 750 cc T140 Bonneville engine. This made the engine livelier with a better throttle response and with maximum torque produced at higher engine speeds. The TR65 also has a single 30 mm Amal carburettor and a mild cam.

Aimed at the economy market, it was cheaper to insure than the T140 and could return 54 mpg_{‑imp} (5.2 L/100 km; 45 mpg_{‑US}). Costs were reduced by having a single silencer, using mechanical contact breaker points instead of electronic ignition and using a drum rear brake instead of the more expensive disc brake. Instead of a tachometer, the warning lights and ignition switch were housed in the right hand pod of the instrument binnacle. Cycle parts, including the Girling rear suspension units, were painted in satin black rather than being chromed or polished and the exhaust system was black chromed to match. Dunlop Gold Seal economy tyres were fitted instead of the more expensive Avon Roadrunners specified for the 750cc roadster range. Triumph however included newly introduced European components such as German ULO direction indicators and Italian Radaelli wheel rims and Paioli petrol taps. The original 'paper dart' Thunderbird logo designed by Edward Turner for the first Thunderbirds in 1949 was retained on the side panel badge as a reminder of the model's lineage. Triumph described the TR65 in their publicity poster as combining Performance With Economy.

Although produced in a USA variant with a 2-gallon tank and high handlebars as compared to the 4 gallon tank, with low handlebars for the UK and the rest of the world, no TR65 was ever exported to the United States. This was because, as with the 750 cc TR7V Tiger, from mid-1978 on, the fitted Amal Mk 1 carburettor offended that country's Environmental Protection Agency's regulations. The TR65 was exported to Japan, South Africa, Western Europe and to British Commonwealth countries including Australia, Cyprus, Canada and New Zealand, albeit to the latter three in small numbers.

A TR65S Thunderbird model was one factory-fitted with the electronic ignition and electric starter options. A TR65S fitted with after-market Hedingham leading link front forks carried London residents Richard and Mopsa English and a Squire sidecar around the world from 1982 to 1986. The journey is detailed in their book, Full Circle, and the TR65S combination used has been on display at the London Motorcycle Museum since 2010 having initially been housed at the National Motorcycle Museum upon the English's return.

== Models ==
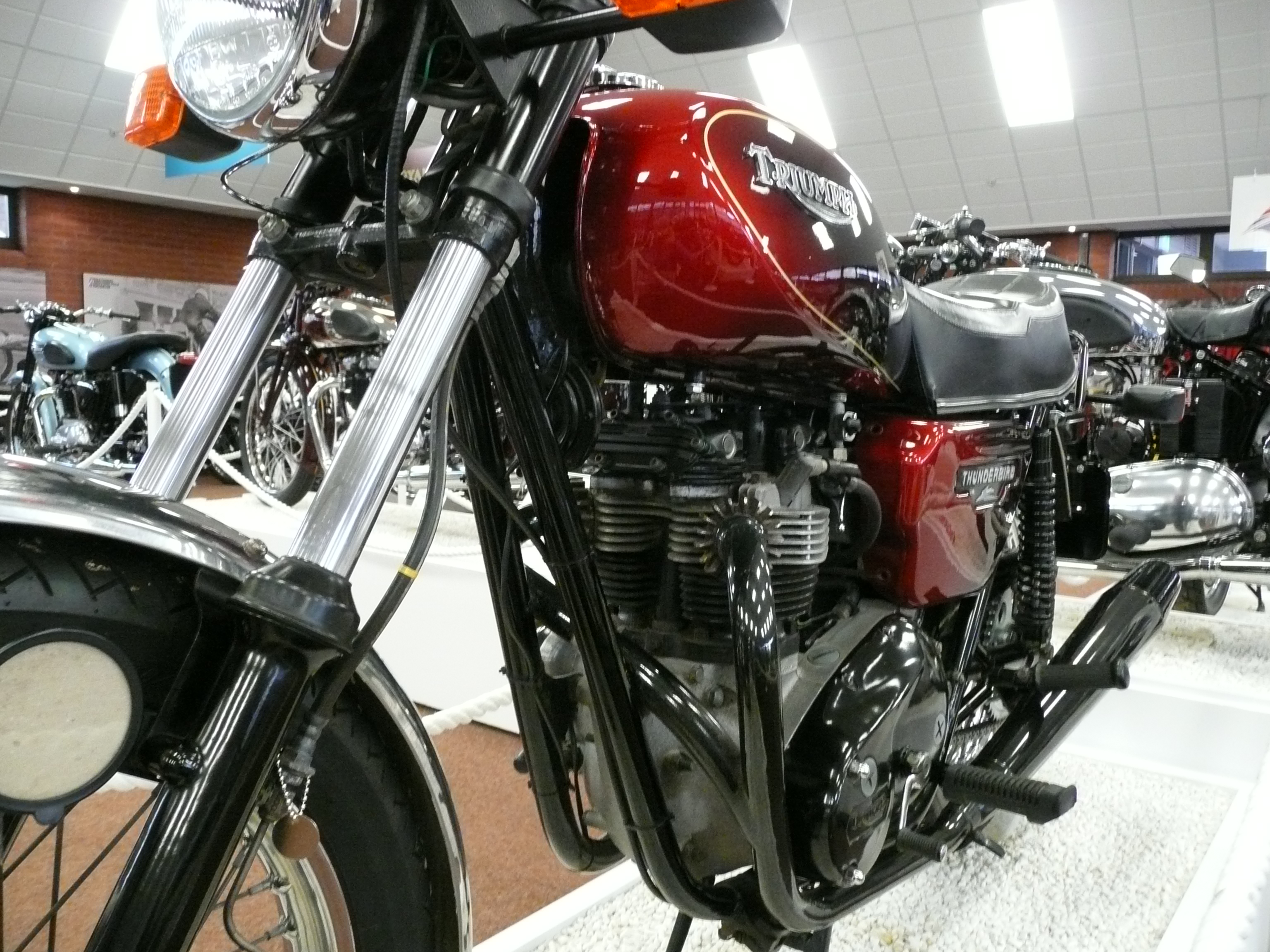
1981 UK specification Triumph TR65 Thunderbird at the National Motorcycle Museum (UK) showing black engine finish and siamesed exhaust system.

All UK/RoW TR65 models were to come with the newly designed, Italian-sourced, 4 gallon fuel tank (pictured) but in his 2009 book 'Save the Triumph Bonneville!' former Triumph chairman, John Rosamond, details shortages of this part meant that the older 4 gallon 'breadbin'-style tank was initially used.

A trail version with electronic ignition, the TR65T Tiger Trail, was also introduced in 1981 but together with the earlier 750 cc version was dropped from the range due to poor sales in late 1982, perhaps understandable given that it was priced the same as the 750 cc version.

According to Triumph's 1982/3 range brochure the cycle parts of that season's 'USA' styled Thunderbird dispensed with the satin black finish, instead adopting bright chrome, polished alloy, a tachometer, twin bright-chromed exhausts and Marzocchi rear suspension units which came with black springs as standard. The UK version added the twin exhausts, Marzocchis suspension and a tachometer but retained the satin black cycle parts of the 1981/2 models. Whilst both versions retained their contact breaker points ignition, they were now, like the 750 cc models, shod with Avon Roadrunner tyres. There were price differentials for 1982 USA and UK/RoW styles.

Ten TR65 were specially ordered from Meriden and modified as Dernys for bicycle speed trials work/pace bikes at the Leicester Velodrome although they were since located at London's Herne Hill facility.

Planned for 1984 and styled after the T140 TSX, a custom model and further sleeved-down TR60 600 cc Thunderbird was exhibited but not produced, the co-operative closing down towards the end of 1983. The new 600cc engine's bore and stroke was 76mm x 66mm with a compression ratio of 8.5:1. Electric starting came as standard with no kick start fitted. These were aimed at the newly qualified rider for whom the cost of insuring Triumph's larger models was too expensive.

The prototype Thunderbird 600 was converted by the factory into a conventional kick start TR65 to fulfil a Ministry of Defence order. From the Meriden Triumph factory production records held by the Vintage Motor Cycle Club this TR65 made on 1 June 1983 was the last 650 cc motorcycle and the second to last motorcycle made at Meriden before the factory's closure that August.

== Triumph Daytona 600 cc prototype ==
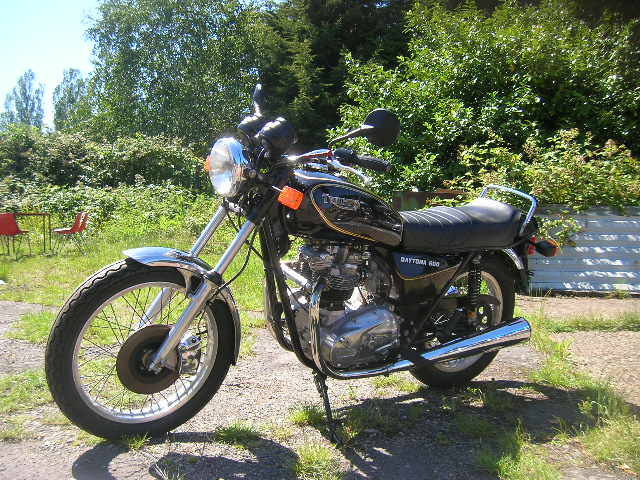
1983 prototype 600 cc Daytona made by Triumph's Meriden factory at the London Motorcycle Museum

A 600 cc Triumph Daytona 600 was manufactured in 1983 by Triumph Motorcycles in their Meriden factory. It was a short-stroke twin-carburettor version of the 650 cc TR65 Thunderbird with an 8.5:1 compression ratio, but it was exhibited at the 1983 motorcycle show at the National Exhibition Centre as a new model for their (eventually unrealised) 1984 range. Unique for that year's home market models, it featured rear-set foot rests and a plastic 'ducktail' rear end over the short chromed rear mudguard from the Triumph T140 TSX. Although sporting a front disc brake, it retained the drum rear brake of the TR65 Thunderbird.

With a claimed top speed of over 100 miles per hour, the target market was said by Meriden to be newly qualified riders for whom the cost of insurance made their 650cc and 750cc bikes prohibitively expensive. Two prototypes were made, one show version with electric start, the other with a kick start for testing. The latter, the only one left after the Meriden factory finally closed in 1983, is on display at the London Motorcycle Museum.

== See also ==
- List of Triumph motorcycles
