= Wayne Moulton =

American motorcycle designer (1932–1995)

Wayne LaVar Moulton
- Born: June 19, 1932
- Died: August 21, 1995 (aged 63)
- Occupation: Motorcycle designer

Wayne LaVar Moulton (June 19, 1932 – August 21, 1995) was a motorcycle designer called "the father of the Japanese cruiser" after introducing specific designs for importers to the lucrative US motorcycle market. The custom/cruiser market continually occupies one of the biggest slices of the important large displacement US motorcycle market.

His industry positions included Vice President of Professional Racing for American Motorcyclist Association 1983–86; President, Triumph Motorcycles America Company, vice president of Kawasaki Motorcycle Company and president of Vetter Fairing Company.

The basis of his designs was his marketing philosophy that, "a popular motorcycle can have four different variations- a standard, a limited, a cafe racer and a touring bike."

== Kawasaki LTD series ==
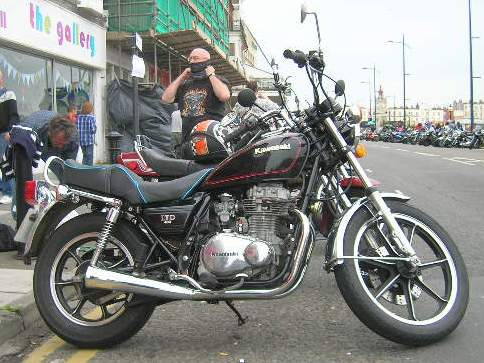
Kawasaki Z400LTD (with aftermarket seat cover) displaying all of Wayne Moulton's LTD styling cues.

Whilst at Kawasaki, as director of technical operations, Moulton introduced the LTD motorcycle series. These brought custom-styling touches to the in-line four-cylinder Kawasaki Z1 standard street-bike/roadster model. The LTD style was typified by shortened mudguards (fenders), stepped seat, high handlebars, a 'tear-drop' petrol tank, large rear tyre and short megaphone exhausts. Moulton was quick to emphasise that his design was not influenced by the American manufacturer, Harley-Davidson but rather privately customised British motorcycles like the Triumph and Birmingham Small Arms. The first Moulton-designed model, the KZ900LTD was introduced in 1975 and was immediately successful with demand outstripping supply. Moulton's LTD styling spawned similar designs from Kawasaki's competitors, with Yamaha's 'Special' series being extremely successful.

== Kawasaki Z1-R ==
Flowing on from the success of the LTD series, Moulton designed a sport-touring model, the Z1-R, for Kawasaki. Here, Moulton introduced the cafe-racer / sport-touring look to the same in-line 4-cylinder engine. The design involved having the front wheel of smaller diameter than standard and a 'cockpit' fairing around the handlebars and instruments. The lack of added engine performance over the standard model meant this design was not as successful as the LTD but Moulton founded a company to re-market unsold Z1-Rs with a turbo-charger as the Z1-RTC.

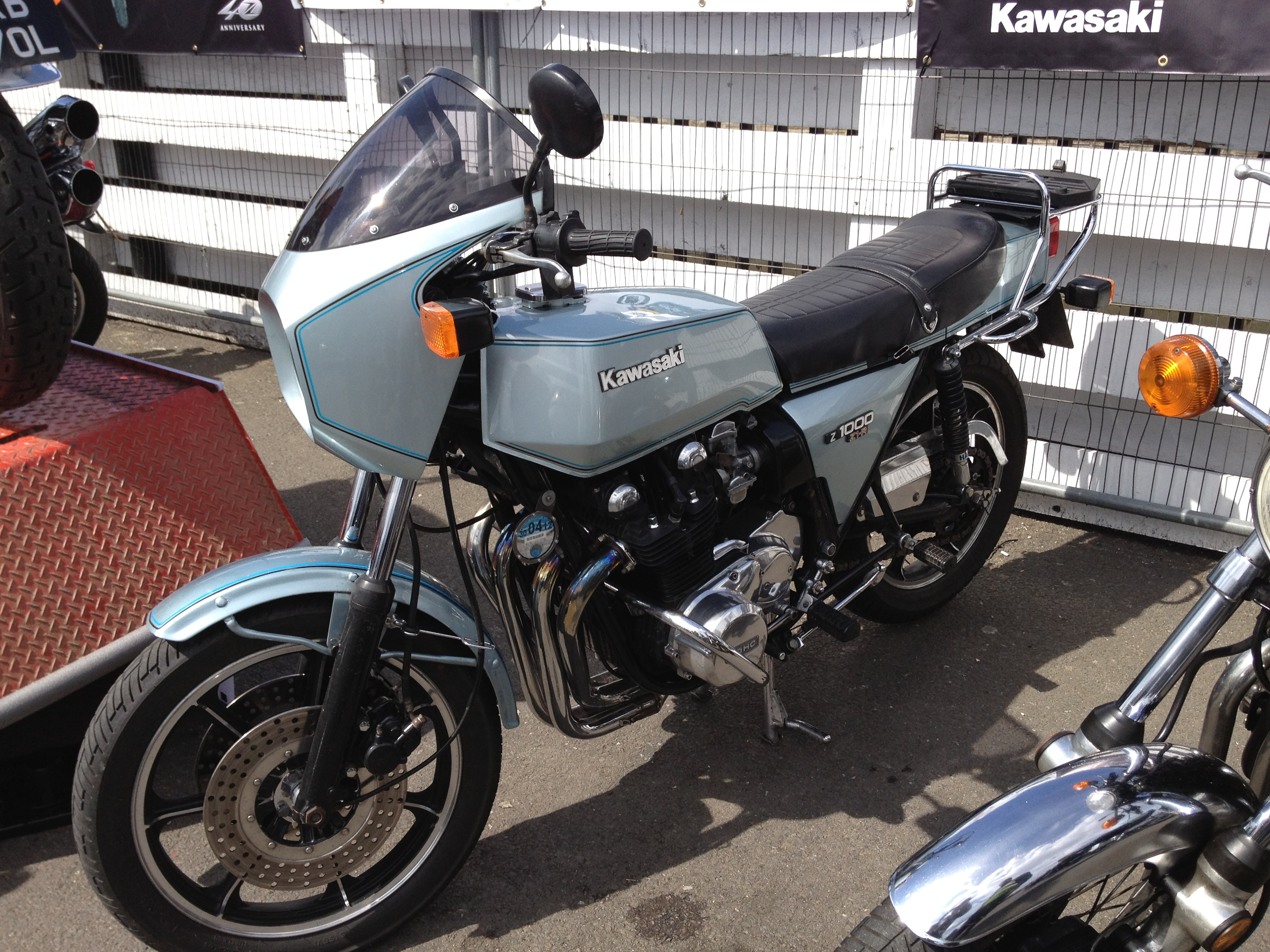
Kawasaki Z1-R motorcycle introduced Wayne Moulton's 'sports-tourer' design but was unsuccessful.

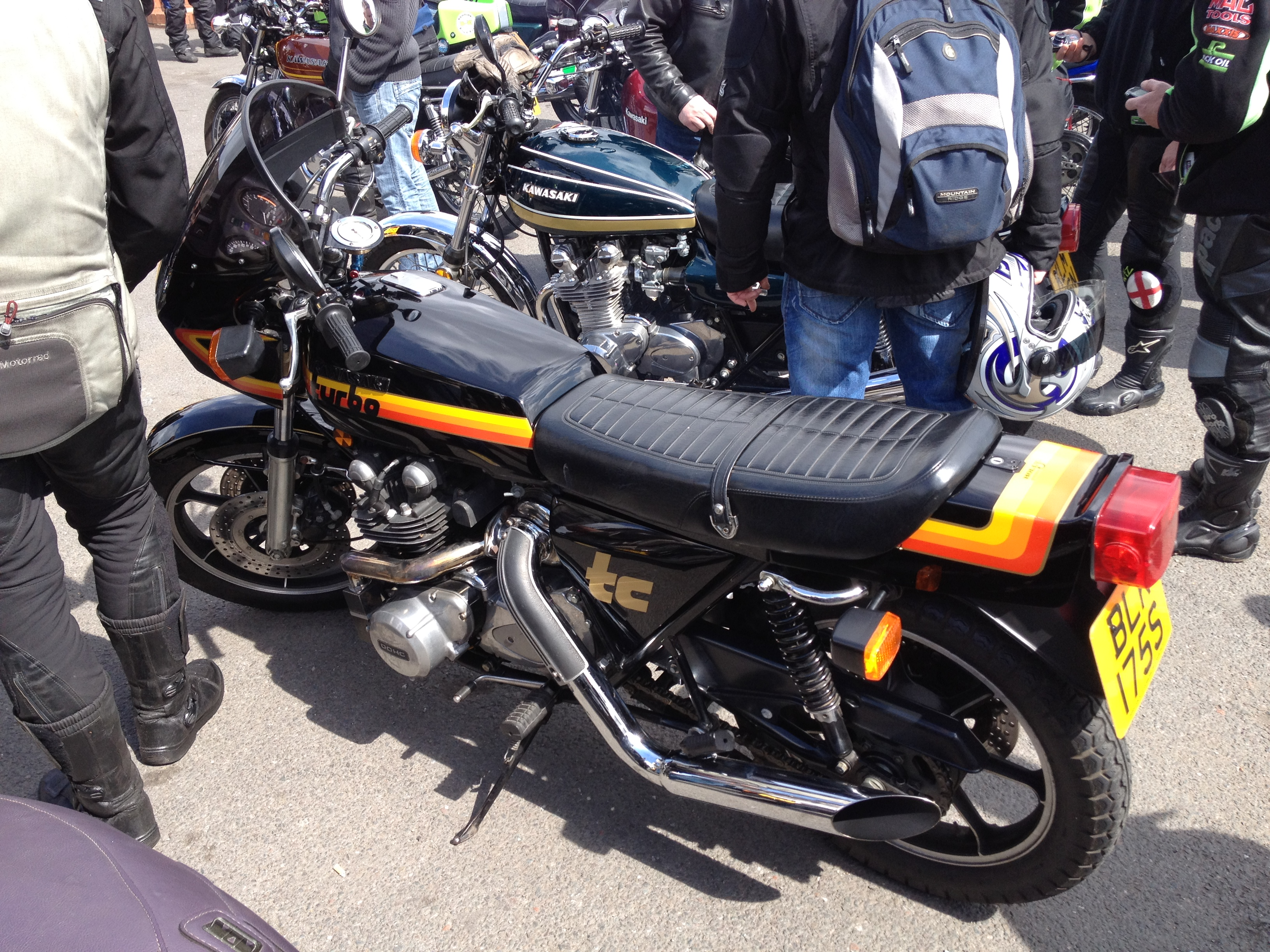
Turbo-charged Kawasaki Z1-RTC motorcycle created by Wayne Moulton to market unsold Z1-R models.

== Triumph T140 TSX ==
In the 1960s, Moulton was part owner with Tom Melehes of Triumph West Motorcycle Shop for 13 years before joining the US motorcycle operation of Japanese manufacturer Kawasaki, blaming his move upon the then-intransigent nature of the British operation as to motorcycle design.

On the back of his success with Kawasaki, Moulton was invited by the British Triumph factory's Brenda Price to head up Triumph Motorcycle America (TMA), then struggling to market the high-priced but old-fashioned standard 750 cc Triumph Bonneville T140 roadster model. Moulton accepted the post, his change of heart being due to the struggling Triumph, then run by a workers' co-operative at Meriden, now being very flexible in their approach to design suggestions for the US market.

First, Moulton convinced Triumph to market in the US their European-styled T140EX Bonneville Executive touring model. With its Brearley-Smith bikini fairing and lean styling, the Executive echoed of Moulton's Z1-R series sport-touring design signatures.

To stimulate Triumph business, Moulton also introduced the British Bike Roadride event in 1981 and coined their 1981-2 advertising slogan: It's A Feeling You Never Forget. Moulton's British Bike Roadride was well-attended even when TMA was in its final days.

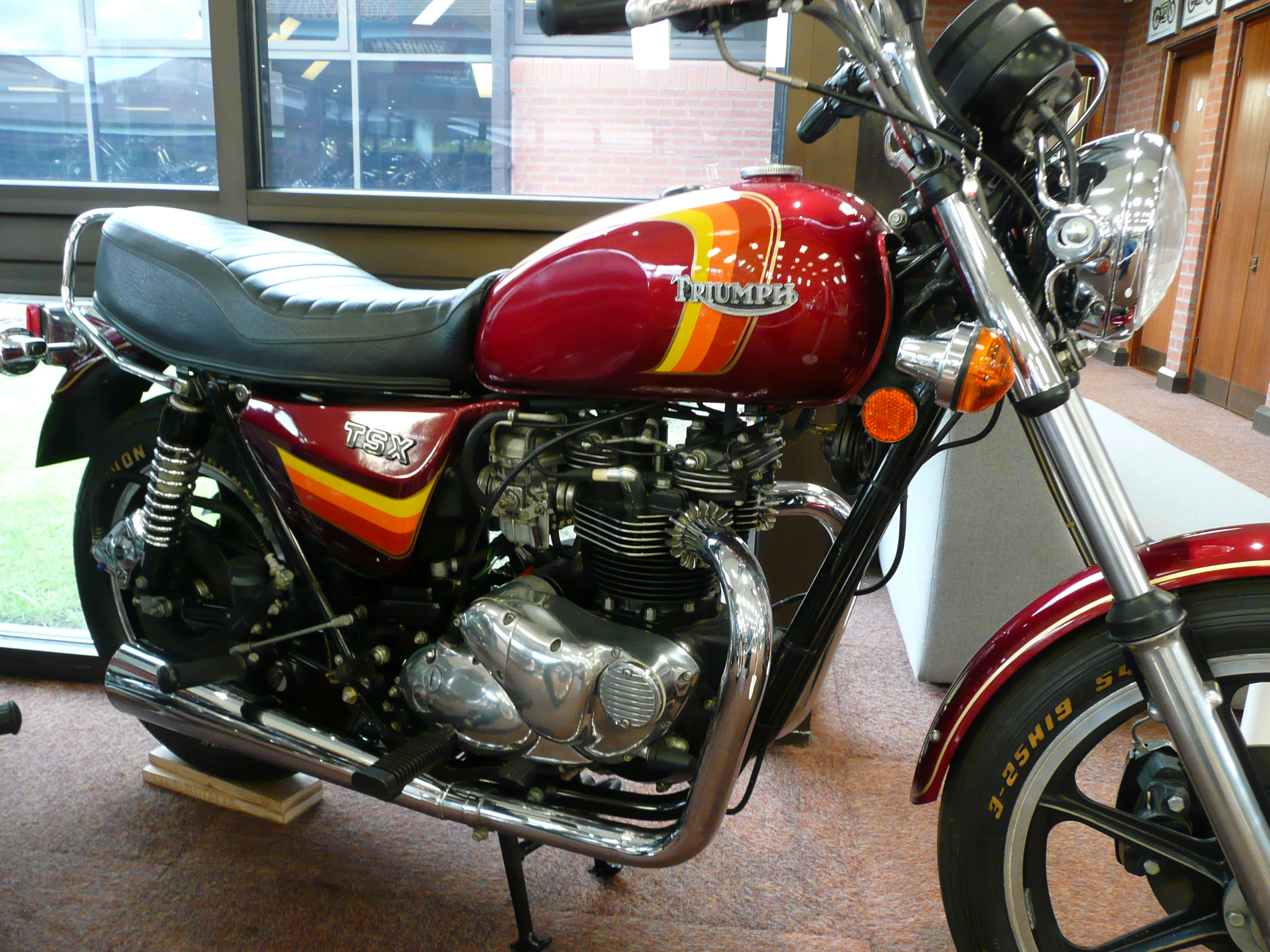
Wayne Moulton's favorite design, the 1982 Triumph TSX was copied exactly into production.

Harking back to his LTD series, he designed the similarly styled Triumph T140 TSX advertising it, without irony, with the slogan A Yamakawahonzuki It Ain't! The multi-coloured decals on the TSX tank and side panels, a first for a Bonneville, echoed Moulton's LTD models at Kawasaki and contemporary Yamaha tank designs. The TSX was designed by Moulton to have Triumph's new 8-valve engine but this was late in development so the 4-valve T140ES engine was used instead. The 8-valve engine was later marketed as the Triumph T140W TSS. Moulton insisted the production version of the TSX replicate his design exactly and this Triumph did. Being the Triumph Bonneville's biggest market, America had always been a strong influence upon the Meriden factory’s design office but this was the sole instance of an original American design actually being produced by the factory for this or any of their other popular twin-cylinder models.

Moulton considered the Triumph T140 TSX to be his favorite design later stating, "If I was to build a bike in my garage to play with, that's the way I'd build it."

Just before Triumph Motorcycle America's British parent company closed on 23 August 1983, Moulton moved to the Vetter Fairing Company, later serving as commissioner in charge of motorcycle racing for the American Motorcycle Association.

== Personal life ==
Moulton was born on June 19, 1932, in Heber City, Utah, to Nephi and Ione Andrus Moulton. He was also very active in professional trap-shooting clubs in Texas and California, and a member of the Church of Jesus Christ of Latter-day Saints. Moulton died August 21, 1995, in Chino, California, at age 63, survived by his wife, Rebecca Cox Moulton and children Roger, Dale, Kevin, Leland, Wendy and Jessica.
