= Triumph T140 TSX =

British motorcycle

Triumph TSX
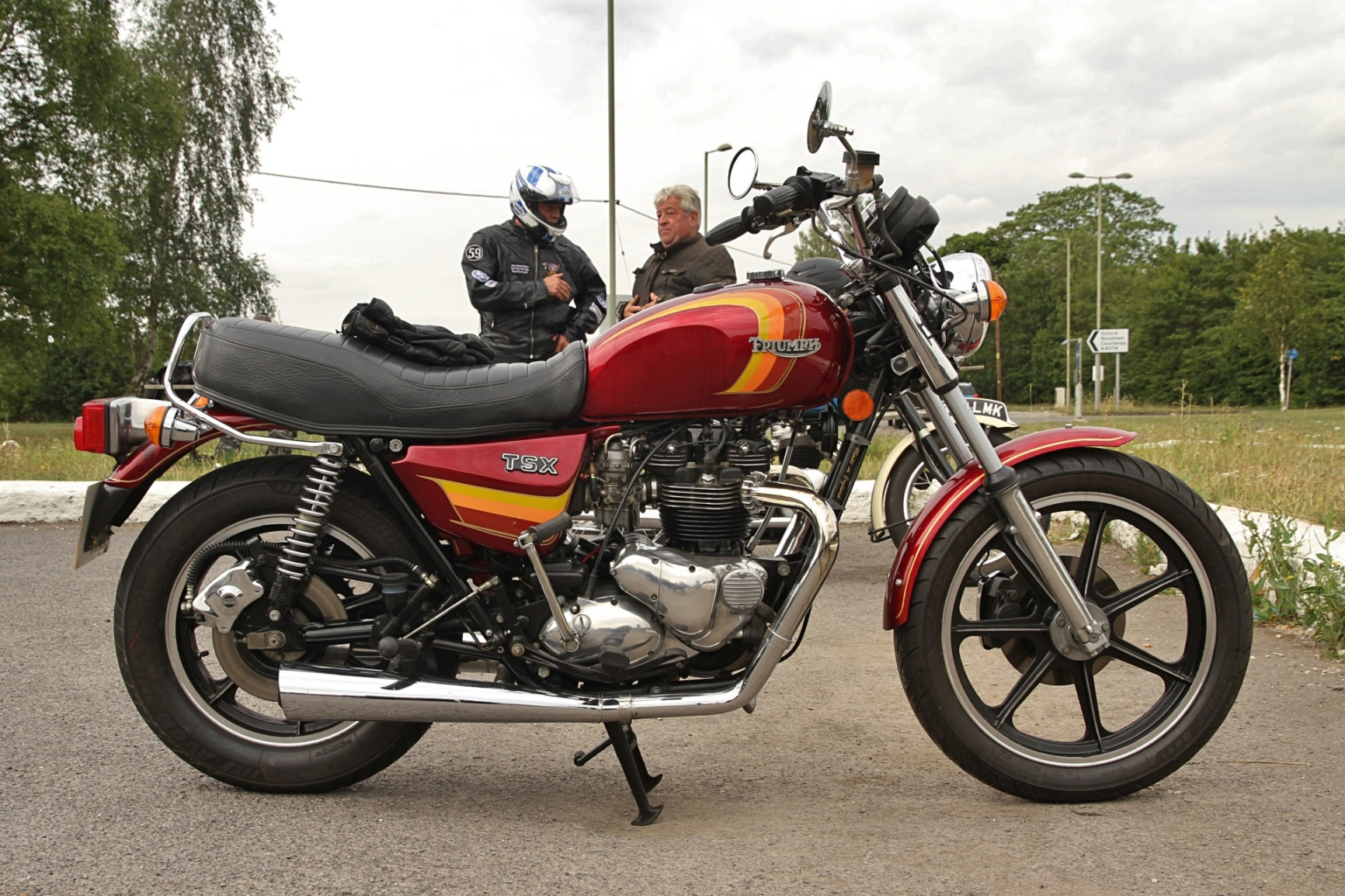
- Manufacturer: Triumph Engineering
- Production: 1982–1983
- Engine: 748 cc (45.6 cu in) air cooled four stroke, parallel twin, two valves per cylinder
- Power: 48.6 hp (36.2 kW) @ 6,500 rpm
- Transmission: 5-speed to chain final drive
- Weight: 200 kg (440 lb) (dry)
- Fuel capacity: 10.5 litres (2.3 imp gal; 2.8 US gal)

The Triumph TSX was a British motorcycle credited by the factory as being designed in 1981–1982 by Wayne Moulton, president of Triumph Motorcycles America(TMA), the factory's American arm. This is the only instance of Triumph's signature twin cylinder models being designed by an American.

== Origins ==
Brenda Price, Moulton's predecessor, had earlier persuaded Brian Jones, Meriden's engineering director, to come up with a low rider-styled Triumph Bonneville for the USA market, her having observed their US dealers' success at independently marketing such models. Jim Barclay of the factory designed a prototype low rider, the Phoenix, exhibited on the factory stand at the 1980 London Earls Court motorcycle show. This model with its rectangular headlamp and unusual instrument console was not produced. Triumph had already experienced poor sales stateside with their 1979 T140D Bonneville Special model which Moulton identified to the factory as having failed in its execution to capture the American imagination. Upon this basis, Moulton set to work designing a Triumph Bonneville that would appeal to his countrymen albeit having only a limited budget to do so of only £3000GBP.

== Specification ==
Essentially a Triumph Bonneville with "West Coast" American styling, the TSX was distinguished by many details. The outstanding feature was its lowered chassis and 16-inch-diameter (410 mm) rear wheel (instead of the usual 18 inch rim) with the engine offset in the frame, a unique swingarm and a suitably abbreviated chromed chainguard all to accommodate this.

The TSX engine was a standard American specification T140ES (electric start Bonneville) 748 cc (45.6 cu in) with two 32-mm Bing carburettors (made under licence by Amal) and Lucas electronic ignition. Although the German importer offered electric start as an option for their TSX, in all other markets, it was the kickstart that was the optional extra. Whilst retaining the polished outer covers, the rest of the TSX engine differed cosmetically being black painted with the cooling fin edges bright polished. The engine's chromed exhaust pipes were of a larger bore than the standard Bonneville with a balance pipe between the short megaphone silencers hidden under the frame.

The TSX frame differed from the standard Bonneville frame in having the mounting points for the Paioli rear shock absorbers set at a lower angle for the lower seat height emulating a 'low rider' look and a bracket to enable the exterior mounting of the Brembo rear brake master cylinder. The TSX seat unique to the model had a pronounced step so that the rider sat in rather than upon it. The passenger grabrail was also unique to the TSX being raised to take account of the higher step of the passenger seating and rubber-mounted the rear turn indicators. The TSX side panels were new too and of a more abbreviated form than those of other Triumph models. Both the front and rear mudguards were shorter than the standard Bonneville, the former being from the failed T140D Bonneville Special albeit now with a painted finish. The rear mudguard had a black plastic extension for the large vehicle registration plate mandatory in the United Kingdom.

The TSX fuel tank was a unique design made in Italy for the model having only one angled Paioli left hand petrol tap situated ahead to accommodate the larger Bing carburettors and off-set engine. This tank also had Moulton's specified centralised filler hole with an optional locking cap (mandatory for America) and a balance pipe situated on the front of the tank's underside. For the first time on a Bonneville model, decals were used to decorate the tank and side panels, these being of the gold-lined red/orange/yellow stripe type. The underlying TSX paint scheme was initially Burgundy with a Midnight Black version later offered alongside it from August 1982. Midnight Blue was proposed as a further alternative for the unrealised 1983/4 version of the TSX.

A slightly lower rise and wider USA style handlebar was fitted and chromed Lucas turn indicators returned in place of the black plastic ULO items that had replaced them on other Triumph models from 1981. A chromed Lucas H4 headlamp was mounted on a thick chromed wire surround.

A Brembo rear brake master cylinder was fitted in place of the usual Automotive Products (AP) Lockheed item which remained for the front, as well as supplying both front and rear calipers. Dual front discs were an option.

Although the 1982–1983 brochure showed Goodyear 'Eagle' tyres fitted, an Avon 'Roadrunner' rear and 'Speedmaster' front tyre went on production models, the tyres' raised lettering being picked out in white.

Whilst there were components from Germany such as the Magura choke lever and Bumm mirrors and Italian Veglia instruments, Brembo rear brake master cylinder and Paioli rear shock absorbers and petrol tap, the only American parts on the TSX, a model targeting the American market, were the Morris alloy wheels.

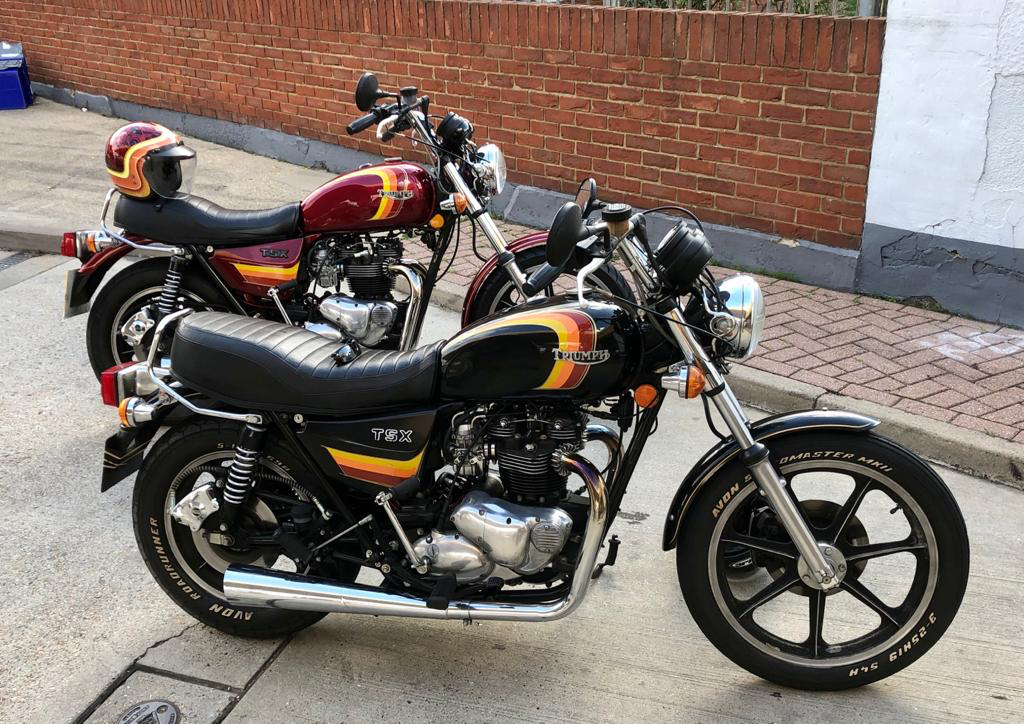
1983 red UK and black USA market Triumph TSX motorcycles

== Production ==
Assembly of the TSX component parts was to begin in March 1982 with the model being unveiled the following month at the 1982 International Motorcycle Show at the National Exhibition Centre with Moulton in attendance and production starting in June. Moulton forecast sales of 1000 TSX provided the first ones arrived stateside no later than June 1982 ready for the 1983 spring selling season. Referencing Japanese rivals in the factory custom low rider market, Moulton advertised the TSX stateside with the line, A Yamakawahonzuki It Ain't. This was Triumph Motorcycles America's last press advertisement. Despite being well-received stateside, Triumph could only afford to export 140 TSX to the target American market.

== Reception ==
Contemporary road tests of the TSX were positive about engine performance, light weight and looks with criticism of the price, harshness of the suspension and quality of the Veglia instrumentation. British magazine Motorcycle Sport liked the TSX stating, ' It is an attractive, well-finished bike which handles well, performs adequately and sounds superb '. An American dealer was quoted as saying, ' Our customers loved (the TSX) and we could have sold loads, but we only got one before the whole thing finished. '.

== Epilogue ==
The TSX, unchanged but with an extra Midnight Blue colour option, was to have been included in the factory's unrealised 1984 range It was called the TSX4 to distinguish it from its proposed new stablemate the similarly styled TSX8. The TSX8 was instead fitted with the eight valve engine from the Triumph T140W TSS. Side panel badges added a '4' or '8' to reflect the new designations. Wayne Moulton originally designed the TSX with the 8-valve TSS engine in mind but this engine had not been finalised in time for production.

Production of all Triumph models ceased with the closure of the Meriden works on August 26, 1983.
