= Fernando Radaelli =

Brazilian footballer

Personal information
- Full name: Fernando Chemin Radaelli
- Date of birth: 9 June 1977 (age 49)
- Place of birth: Dourados, Brazil
- Height: 1.80 m (5 ft 11 in)
- Position: Right wing back

Youth career
- Corinthians
- Ponte Preta
- São José
- Coritiba

Senior career*
Years	Team	Apps	(Gls)
1998–2002	Coritiba		
2002–2003	Inter de Limeira		
2003–2004	União Barbarense		
2004–2005	CSA		
2005–2006	ECO		
2006–2007	Portuguesa		
2008	NK Međimurje		
- * Club domestic league appearances and goals

Fernando Chemin Radaelli (born 9 June 1982 in Dourados) is a Brazilian footballer who last played for NK Međimurje in Croatia.
