= Radaelli =

Radaelli is an Italian surname. Notable people with the surname include:

- Fernando Chemin Radaelli (born 1982), Brazilian footballer
- Giuseppe Radaelli (1833–1882), Milanese fencer and soldier
- Mario Radaelli (1912 – ?), Italian hurdler
- Mauro Radaelli (1967), Italian racing cyclist
- Paolo Radaelli (born 1961), Italian physicist and academic
