= Marzocchi =

Italian manufacturer of suspension components

Marzocchi Suspension S.r.l
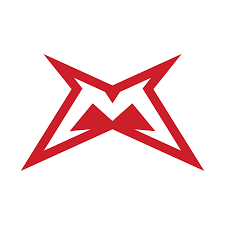
- Type: Subsidiary (S.r.l.)
- Industry: Motorcycle
- Founded: 1949; 77 years ago
- Founder: Stefano Marzocchi; Guglielmo Marzocchi
- Headquarters: Zola Predosa, Bologna, Italy
- Area served: Worldwide
- Key people: Florenzo Vanzetto (CEO)
- Products: Motorcycle suspensions
- Owner: Fox Factory
- Number of employees: 147 (2026)
- Website: Marzocchi Motor Official Website

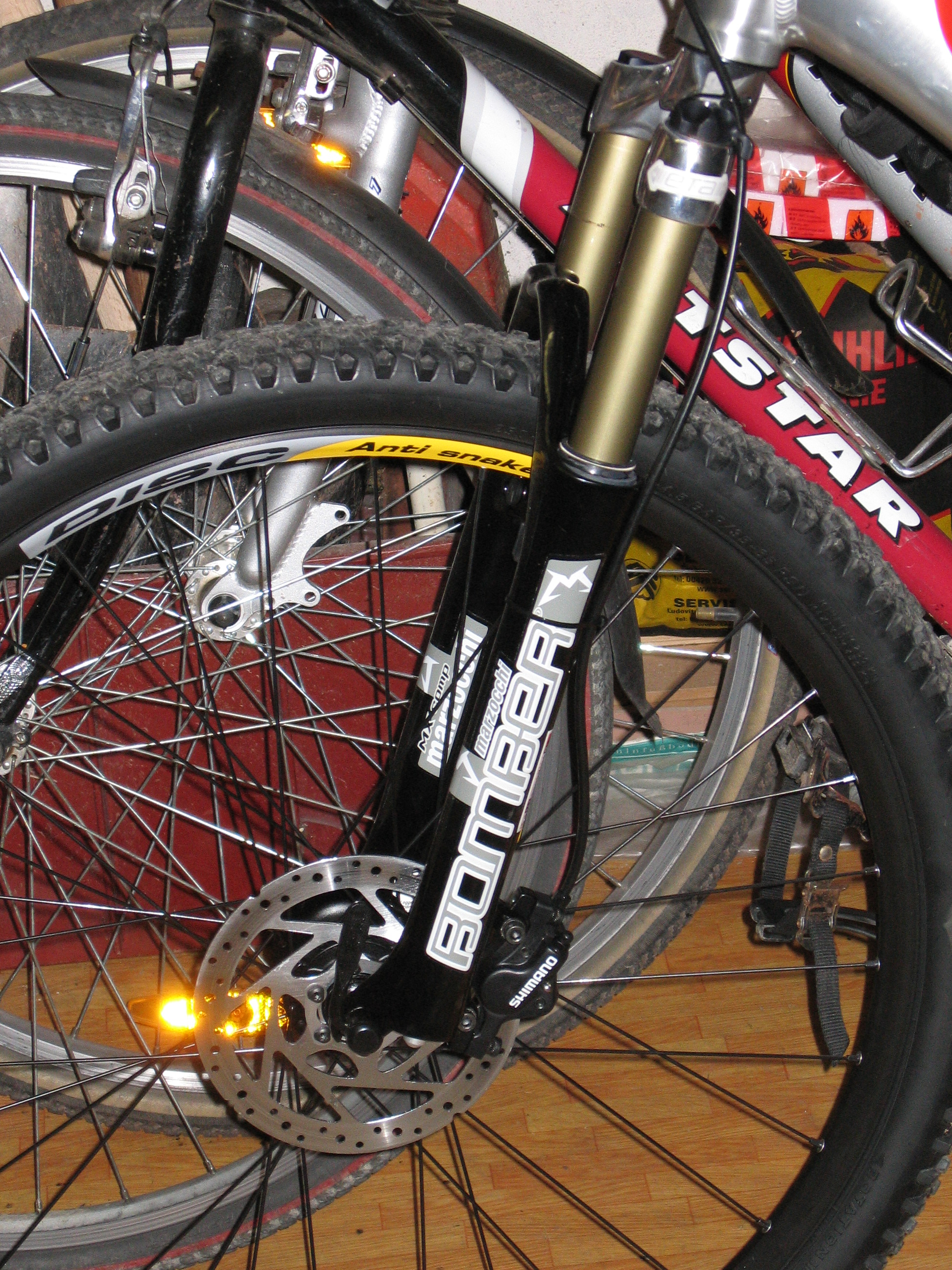
Marzocchi Bomber MX Comp mountain bike fork.

Marzocchi is an Italian manufacturer founded in 1949 by brothers Stefano and Guglielmo Marzocchi. The company no longer produces hydraulic industrial pumps but only suspension components for motorcycles and bicycles. Marzocchi Pompe is still in the hands of the Marzocchi family and produces gear pumps and motors in Bologna.

In the 4th quarter of 2015 the motorcycle suspension assets and the historic Zola Predosa plant were acquired by the Italian company VRM Group which continues to produce suspensions in Italy.

In October 2015 Fox Factory acquired the mountain bike suspension assets from VRM Group.

== History ==
The two brothers Stefano and Guglielmo Marzocchi (former Ducati employees) founded Marzocchi in 1949, starting the production of suspension for large-engined motorcycles in the cellar of their home in Via Zannoni, in Bologna.

By 1953, production had reached 200 pieces a day, the workforce had grown to 25, and the basement in Via Zannoni had become insufficient. The company then began planning for expansion. In 1957 the company was transferred to a more suitable "shed" in Casalecchio di Reno. In the mid-1950s, when motorcycle production suffered a sharp decline, the Marzocchi brothers thought of diversifying production, taking up a gear pump project already started within Ducati during the Second World War.

In 1961, the Marzocchi brothers became convinced that it was necessary to diversify production. The growth of the two production sectors therefore led to the establishment of two distinct companies: Marzocchi Pompe S.r.l. and Marzocchi S.p.A. The first dealt with the design and production of hydraulic pumps, the second with motorcycle suspension.

After 1965, the second generation of Marzocchi entered the scene: Adriano, son of Stefano, and Paolo, son of Guglielmo. For Marzocchi Sospensioni, the products were aimed at the high-end of the market: motocross and large-engined bikes. The company's decision to focus on sports with the aim of product development proved successful. Marzocchi champions have dominated motorcycle circuits throughout Europe.

In the 1980s the collaboration with manufacturers of large-engined road motorcycles such as BMW Motorrad, Moto Guzzi, Ducati expanded and Marzocchi established itself as a leader in Europe in the production of suspensions.

In the 1990s, the market diversified further. In the United States, the sport of mountain biking began to spread at a competitive level, and Marzocchi began producing bicycle forks that combined high technology with high performance.

In 2008 the company was acquired by American automotive parts manufacturer Tenneco. Until 2007, Marzocchi manufactured the mountain bike suspension forks in Italy.

Since December 2015 the Marzocchi brand was taken over by the Italian company VRM Group together with the historic Zola Predosa plant with the birth of the subsidiary Marzocchi Motor and the reinstatement of 70 employees for production. Florenzo Vanzetto became the CEO of the company. American company Fox Factory acquired only the assets of Marzocchi's mountain bike product lines.

In recent years Marzocchi Motor has become a supplier of forks for numerous motorcycle manufacturers, growing from a turnover of 8 million euros in 2016 to a turnover of 32 million euros in 2021.

In January 2022 an agreement was signed with Zhejiang Mazhuoke Machinery Manufacturing (part of the Qianjiang Motorcycle group) for the construction of a second production plant in the Chinese province of Zhejiang, south of Shanghai, to provide suspension for the domestic market and Chinese customers.

== Motorcycle suspension ==
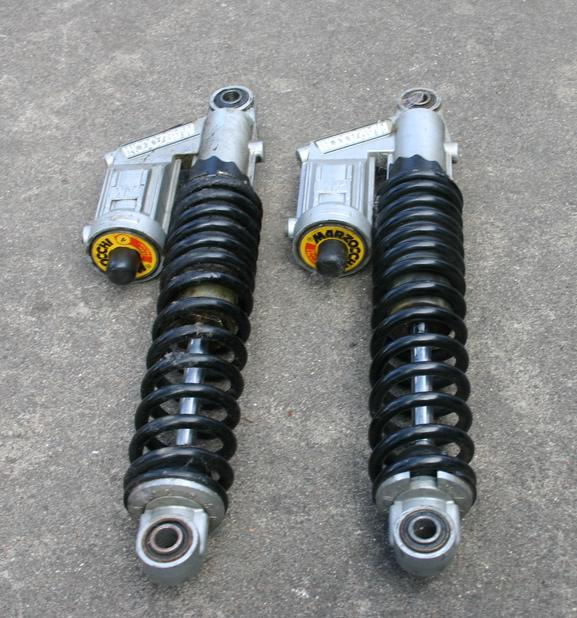
Marzocchi Strada oil-air motorcycle rear suspension units.

Up until the 1980s, Marzocchi was an original equipment manufacturer (OEM) for a number of Italian motorcycle marques, including Moto Morini and Ducati. Its oil shock absorbers were also OEM equipment for Triumph Motorcycles during the latter stages of production at the Meriden plant. Their later 'Strada' model introduced a degree of air suspension to motorcycling and, like the oil shocks, were available as aftermarket fittings for a large number of models. Strada units were OEM for Triumph's T140LE Royal Wedding and TSS models. A big advantage of the Marzocchi shock was its ability to be rebuilt, seal kits and service manuals being readily available. Meriden also experimented with using Marzocchi front forks which were also used on some Italian models. Meriden however closed down before any such forks reached production models.

Marzocchi shocks, albeit of more modern design, are still OEM for a number of manufacturers.

== Bicycle suspension ==
Until 2007, fork production was based in Italy (apart from the entry level OEM parts, which are produced by the Taiwanese SR Suntour in Taiwan). Since 2008, all forks have been made in Taiwan. In recent years, the brand has been used for lower-tier, rebranded Fox Suspension products.

Notable fork models:

- Marzocchi Monster Triple (1999–2005)
- Marzocchi Super Monster Triple (2003–2005)
- Marzocchi Shiver (2001–2005)
- Marzocchi Z1 (1996)
- Marzocchi RAC (2001)
- Marzocchi 888 (2005-2014)
- Marzocchi 66RC (2005-2013)
- Marzocchi Z1 (2022-present)
- Marzocchi Z2 (2022-present)
- Marzocchi Super Z (2022-present)
- Marzocchi Bomber 58 (2022-present)

Notable shock models:

- Marzocchi Roco coil/air (years unknown)
- Marzocchi Moto C2R2 (2014 -?)
- Marzocchi Bomber CR (2021-present)
- Marzocchi Bomber Air (2021-present)

== See also ==
- Shock absorber
- Motorcycle suspension
- List of bicycle parts
- List of Italian companies
