= Magura GmbH =

German cycling company

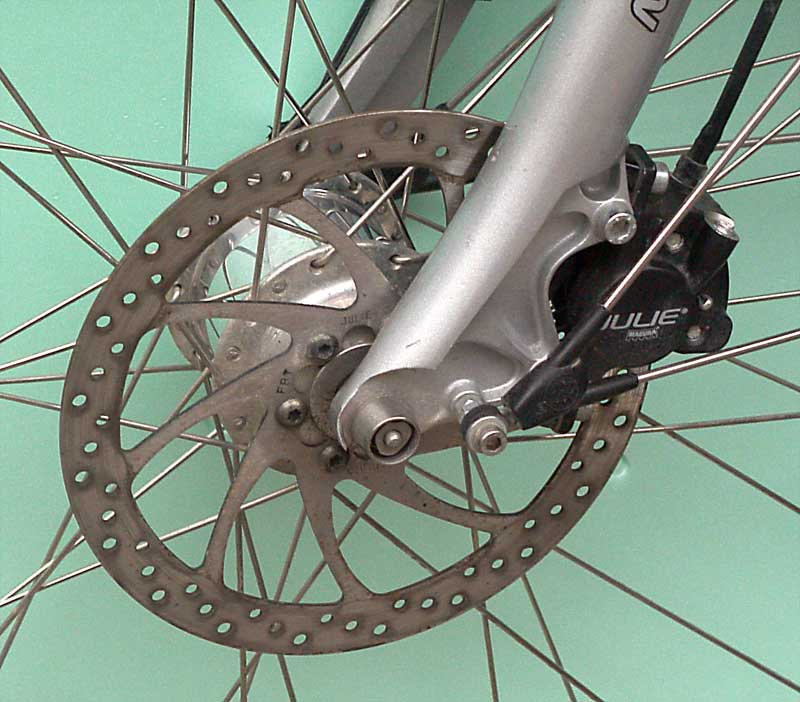
Magura disc brake.

Gustav Magenwirth GmbH & Co. KG, known as Magura, is a German company based in Bad Urach established in 1893 that produces and distributes engineered cycling products and service including cycle suspensions and brakes, sunglasses, helmets, packs, bags, and clothing.
