= London Motorcycle Museum =

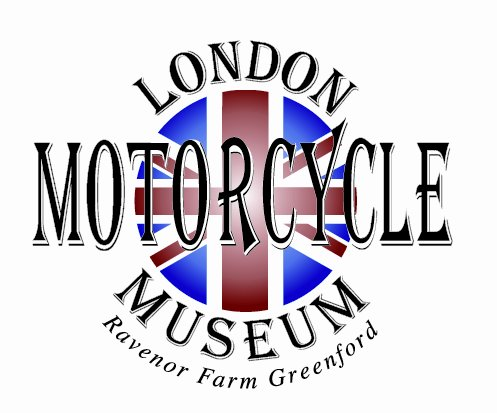

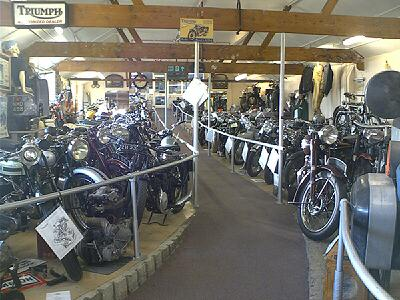

- Location within Greater London
- Established: May 1999; 27 years ago
- Dissolved: October 2019
- Location: Greenford, Ealing; England
- Coordinates: 51°31′51″N 0°21′16″W
- Type: Transport museum
- Visitors: 250,000
- Public transit access: Greenford
- Website: www.london-motorcycle-museum.org

London Motorcycle Museum displayed a range of over 150 classic and British motorcycles. It closed in October 2019, partly due to inability to meet the running costs.

A charitable trust, it opened in May 1999 at Oldfield Lane South, Greenford, Ealing. It displayed a range of over 150 classic and British motorcycles. Notable exhibits included the last Triumph Bonneville T140 out of the Meriden gates in 1983.

== History ==
Bill Crosby, the museum's founder, started collecting good examples of British motorcycles in 1960 when he took over the Reg Allen motorcycle shop in Hanwell. The bikes were displayed at Syon Park in Brentford until 1979 and then at a number of temporary locations until the site in Greenford was found. Formerly Coston's Farm, it had been used as an Ealing Council depot (Ravenor Depot) since the 1930s. Run by the charitable trust volunteers, the museum promoted educational visits, and was affiliated to the British Motorcycle Charitable Trust.

== Intended expansion ==
In 2008, the museum was raising money for an extension to display another sixty motorcycles. The main building was planned as "The Home of Triumph" with special areas for other makes, military and police motorcycles.

== Exhibits ==
The motorcycles on display represented examples of all the well-known makes, such as BSA, Triumph and Norton as well as less well known makers including Coventry-Eagle and Rudge. A full inventory of exhibits could be seen listed on the museum's official web site, including a number of unique prototypes, such as the development Triumph Trident and motorcycles that have been featured in the media.

Exhibits ranged from one of the earliest motorcycles, a 1902 Ormonde 2 1/4 h.p. to a 1993 Royal Enfield Bullet 500 cc and included:

- 1907 298 cc Brown Precision
- 1921 Rudge TT 3 hp
- 1925 596 cc Scott Flying Squirrel
- 1925 980 cc Coventry Eagle Flying 8
- 1937 499 cc Rudge Special
- 1949 998 cc Vincent Rapide Series 'C'
- 1959 Norton Dominator
- 1966 BSA Lightning works production racer

== Media appearances ==
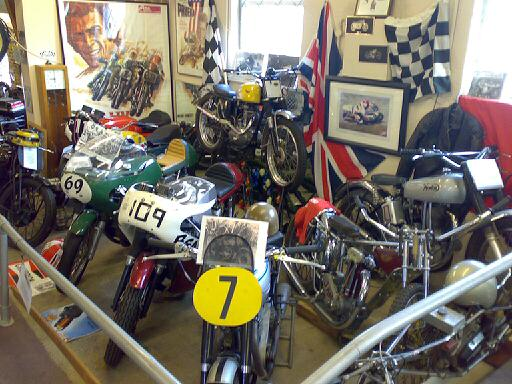
The Museum's collection of racing motorcycles

Motorcycles from the London museum have featured in EastEnders, Dad's Army, A-Z of Royalty (USA-produced feature for Satellite TV) and Men & Motors 'Full Throttle Famous'. The museum is also regularly featured in Classic Bike Guide, Classic Bike, Moto Legende (France's main classic motorcycle magazine) and Motoiclismo (Italy's main motorcycle magazine). The museum was also featured in US TV series, American Chopper in the episode where the Teutul family of Orange County Choppers visited the United Kingdom being shown to be directed there by the actor and well-known motorcycling enthusiast, Ewan McGregor.
