= Triumph Triple =

Range of combustion engines for motorcycles from Triumph

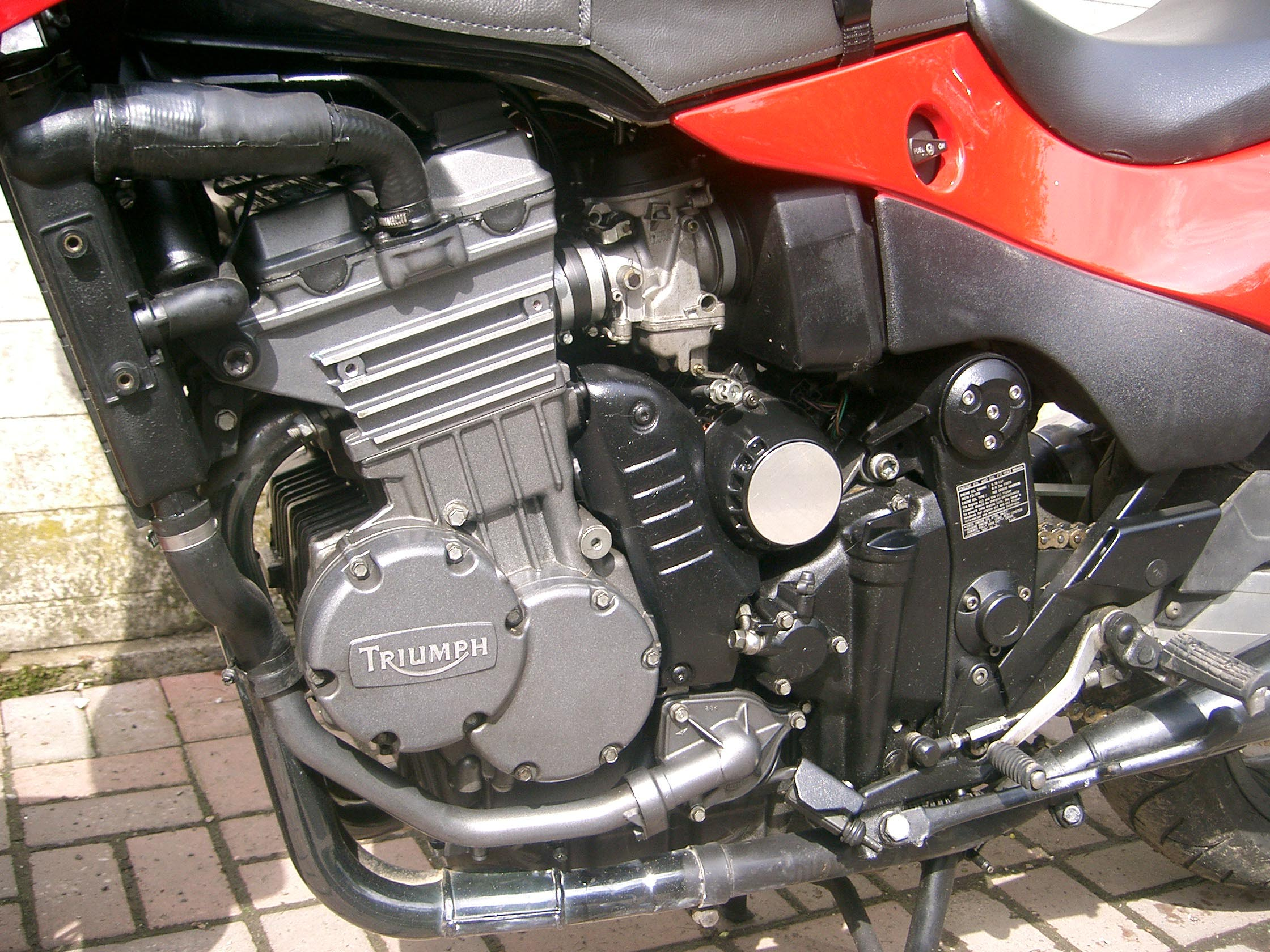
Triumph 900cc engine in Daytona Sprint Special (LH)

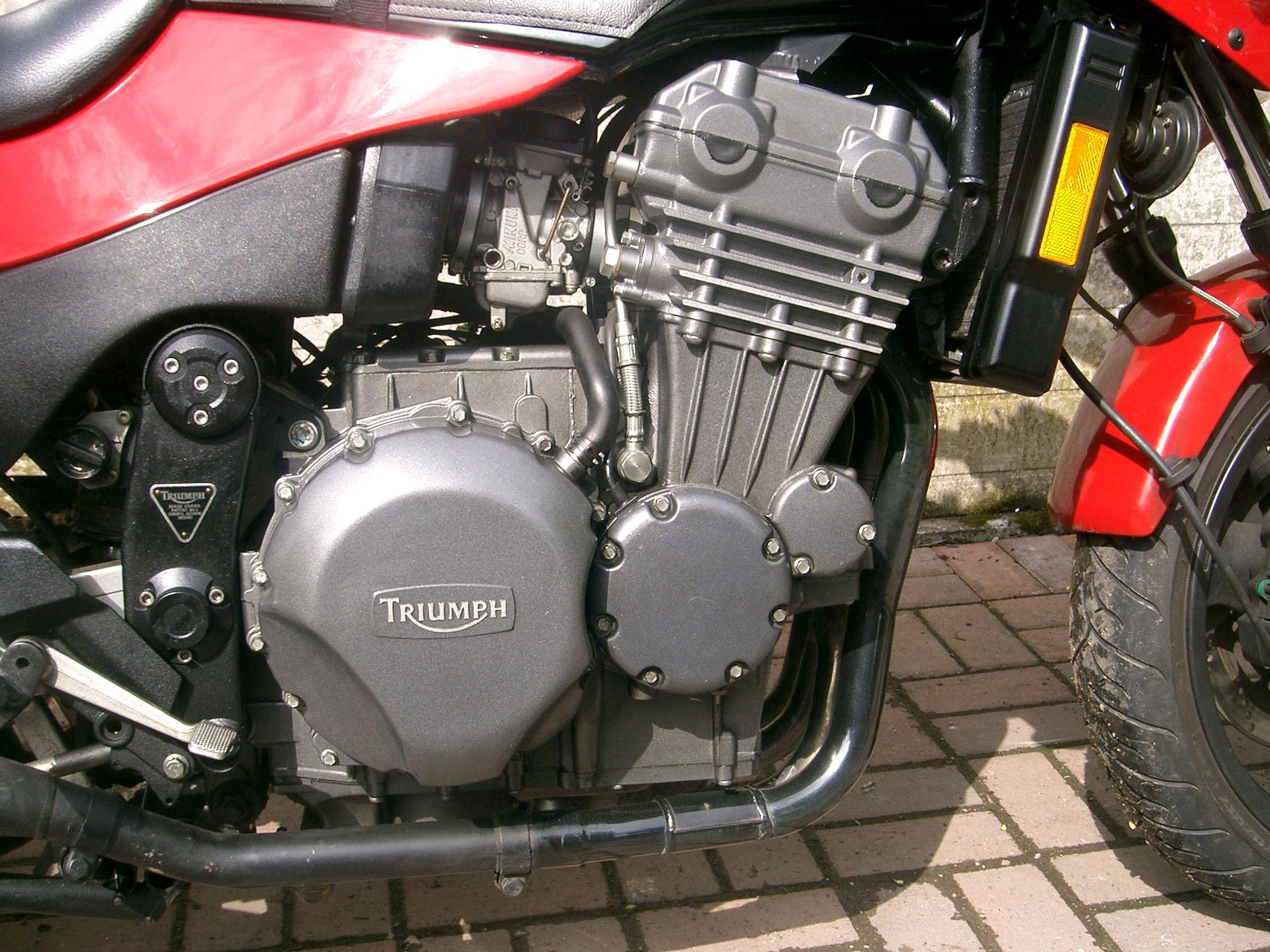
Triumph 900cc engine in Daytona Sprint Special (RH)

The Triumph Triples are a family of modern DOHC inline three-cylinder motorcycle engines made from 1990 onwards by the Triumph Motorcycle Company at their Hinckley, Leicestershire factory. The inspiration for the later triples was the pushrod Triumph Trident, produced from 1968 to 1974 at the Triumph factory at Meriden Works.

The Triumph Triple motorcycle engine has been used in the Trident, Thunderbird, Adventurer, Legend, Tiger, Speed Triple, Sprint ST & RS, Sprint Executive, Trophy, Street Triple, and Daytona models. Bike magazine ranked the Hinckley Triumph Triple as the 10th best motorcycle engine of all time.

== First generation ==
The first generation motor from the reborn Triumph company in 1989 was available as an inline 3-cylinder carburated 4-stroke of either 748 cc (45.6 cu in) called "750", or 885 cc called "900". The primary difference between the two engines was the stroke. The shorter stroke, higher revving 750 used a bore/stroke of 76.0 x 55.0 mm while the 900 used a longer stroke of 65.0 mm. The 750 engine with its eager revving performance was initially believed to be the finer machine, but the longer-legged 900 proved more popular. As a result, the smaller 750 became a budget model and was eventually phased out. Both the 750 and 900 were sold as roadsters called "Tridents". The Sprint 900, a sport tourer with a cockpit fairing, joined the Trident range.

=== 1990s variants ===
The first variation on the 900 triple theme appeared in 1992 with the Tiger 900. This made use of softer cam profiles to produce a less powerful engine but with an even broader spread of torque. Further changes appeared a few years later with the Daytona Super III. This time Triumph collaborated with the tuning gurus at Cosworth to produce the first high performance variant of the triple. Using higher compression pistons and a redesigned cylinder head claimed power was increased from 97 bhp (72 kW) to 115 bhp (86 kW).

In 1995 another variation of the 900 triple engine was introduced in the Thunderbird 900, a model intended for Triumph's first foray back into the US market. It had softer cam profiles and new carburettors, so power dropped again in favour of docility. The engine also received a cosmetic overhaul, by adding polished alloy covers and fake cooling fins on the barrels. In 1997 a sportier machine was produced, the Thunderbird Sport, using the Thunderbird engine with 6 speed gearbox and unrestricted air intake to give more power, 82 bhp (61 kW) as opposed to 69 bhp (51 kW), twin front discs and other details changes to produce an engine in a remarkably similar state of tune to the original Tiger.

== Fuel injection redesign ==
The triple received its first major update in 1997 with a ground up redesign to produce the fuel injected 955 cc (58.3 cu in) T595 Daytona engine, and the 885 cc (54.0 cu in) T509 Speed Triple engine, the latter using the original bore and stroke of the first generation engine. The claimed power outputs for these engines were 128 and 108 bhp (95 and 81 kW) respectively. Over the next few years the 885 engine grew to 955 cc and was used in the newly launched Sprint ST and the later Sprint RS. In this updated form it was still claimed to produce 108 bhp (81 kW), the more powerful 128 bhp (95 kW) being kept for the Daytona. The injected 885 cc triple lived on for another couple of years in an updated Tiger. Triumph made minor updates until 2001, when it performed a major update, first appearing in the Tiger 955i and soon spreading across the rest of the range. Power and torque was increased across the range and this updated model was meant to remedy the faults apparent with the earlier 955 engine. The most lively performer to use this updated triple was the Daytona 955i, in this form claiming 147 bhp (110 kW), the most powerful triple to emerge from Triumph. The 900 triple in its original form lingered on until 2002 in the form of the Trophy 900, being outlived by its four-cylinder relative, the Trophy 1200.

== 1050 cc redesign ==
In 2005 the next generation of the triple emerged in the form of the Sprint ST 1050, swiftly followed by the Speed Triple 1050. The last of the 955 engined bikes – the Tiger – was updated, receiving the cases of the 1050 engine and other small changes although staying at 955 cc capacity until replaced by an all new Tiger 1050 in 2006. 2006 also saw the last year for the Daytona 955i, ending the production of big bore sporting triples. Coincidentally, this year the Sprint 1050 engine received a higher state of tune by lifting the max torque to occur at 7500rpm, closer to the now discontinued Daytona's 8200rpm point.

== 2.3 litre Rocket III engine ==
In mid-2004, Triumph introduced an entirely new triple for use in a new heavyweight cruiser motorcycle, the Rocket III. The engine is 2294 cc, the largest purpose-built mass-produced motorcycle engine in existence. It is liquid-cooled and mounted inline with the frame. As a first for Triumph it was paired with a shaft final drive. It produces 140 hp (104 kW) at 6000 rpm and 147 lb⋅ft (199 N⋅m) of torque. In 2006, the Rocket III was joined by the Rocket III Classic, a more conservatively styled cruiser.

In 2019 a completely redesigned Rocket 3 with a new 2.5 litre (2458cc) engine was introduced.

== Middleweight 675 cc engine ==
In 2006, Triumph abandoned its earlier flirtations with four-cylinder middleweight bikes, and unveiled a 675 cc triple engine to power the all new Daytona 675 sport bike. The engine is liquid-cooled, fuel-injected, transversely-mounted and produces 123 bhp (92 kW) at 12,500 rpm and 53 lb⋅ft (72 N⋅m) of torque at 11,750 rpm. The Daytona 675 has competed very successfully with the Japanese 600 cc inline fours that had dominated the market.

In 2007, a de-tuned version of this engine, with a less severe cam and a slightly lower redline, was used in Street Triple 675 roadster.

== Middleweight 765 cc engine ==
In 2017, Triumph introduced a 765 cc engine, designed for Moto2 (2019 onwards) and the new Street Triple line (not yet Daytona).

== Middleweight 660 cc engine ==
In October 2020, Triumph introduced a 660 cc variant of the 675 cc triple for the new 2021 Triumph Trident budget bike.

== 1160 cc redesign ==
In January 2021, Triumph introduced an all-new 1160 cc engine (inspired by the 765 platform and Moto2), designed for the Speed Triple 1200 RS. Bore was increased to 90mm and stroke was decreased to 60.8mm with peak power at the crank increased to 178 hp and 92 ft-lbs. The redline increased to 11,150 rpm, compression ratio was increased to 13.2 with engine weight reduced by 7 kg and powertrain inertia decreased by 12%.
