= Triumph Sprint =

Triumph Sprint is a model designation used for various motorcycles of British motorcycle manufacturer Triumph Motorcycles.

They were the successor to the "Trident" series, and use further developed variants of the Trident's characteristic three-cylinder inline engine.

These include:

- Triumph Sprint 900
- Triumph Sprint ST
- Triumph Sprint RS
- Triumph Sprint GT
