= Triumph Tiger 900 =

Triumph Tiger 900 may refer to two different motorcycles:

- a model manufactured 1993−1998, see Triumph Tiger 900 (T400),
- a model manufactured from 2020 onwards, see Triumph Tiger 900 (2020).
