= Triumph Speed Triple =

Standard motorcycle

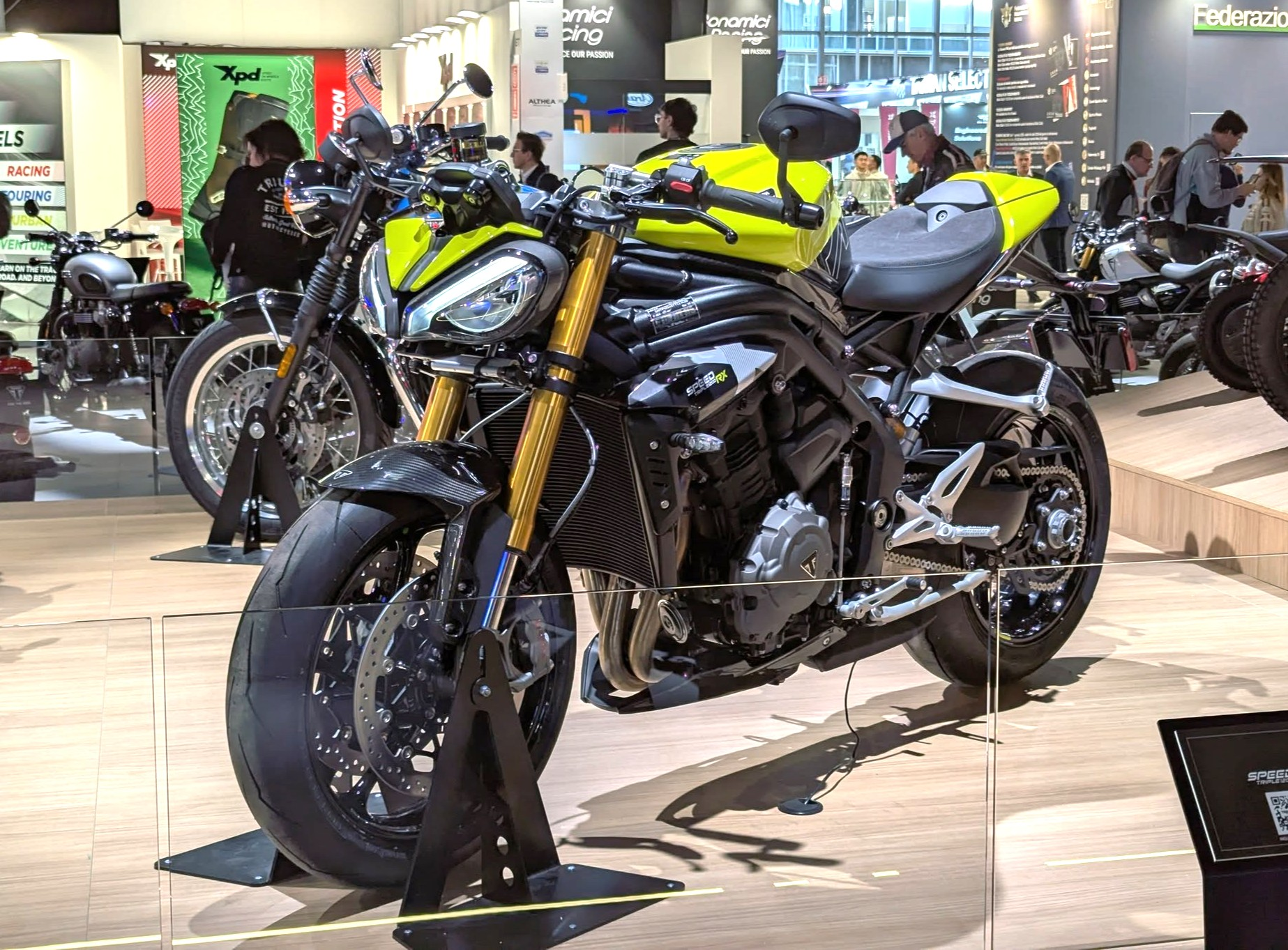
- 2025 Triumph Speed Triple 1200 RX
- Manufacturer: Triumph
- Production: 1994–present
- Class: Streetfighter
- Engine: 1,050 cc (64 cu in) inline triple
- Transmission: sequential manual transmission, chain-drive
- Frame type: Aluminium twin-spar
- Brakes: Front: two 320 mm discs with radial-mounted four-piston Brembo callipers Rear: one 255 mm disc with twin-piston Nissin calliper
- Rake, trail: 22.9°, 91.44 mm (3.600 in)
- Wheelbase: 1,450 mm (56.9 in)
- Seat height: 830 mm (32.5 in)
- Fuel capacity: 15.5 L (3.4 imp gal; 4.1 US gal)

The Triumph Speed Triple is a series of motorcycles produced by Triumph Motorcycles. The 1994 Hinckley Triumph was one of the first motorcycles produced in the streetfighter style (a modern sport bike or race replica motorcycle without an aerodynamic plastic fairing). The style originated with bikers who, having crashed their race replicas, put the bikes back on the road without fairing, and has since become popularised.

== Origins ==
=== Early bikes ===
The initial model was first released to the public in 1994, and was called the Speed Triple as an acknowledgement to the 1938 Speed Twin. It was based on the Triumph Triple series of modular engines, which also powered the Triumph Trident, Daytona sport bike, and the Thunderbird retro bike. This engine came in two displacements as a triple: 750 cc for some European markets, and 885 cc for all other markets. The Speed Triple was originally only equipped with the 885 cc engine, but just before significant changes to the bike were made in 1997, some 750 cc machines were produced using leftover Euro specification engines.

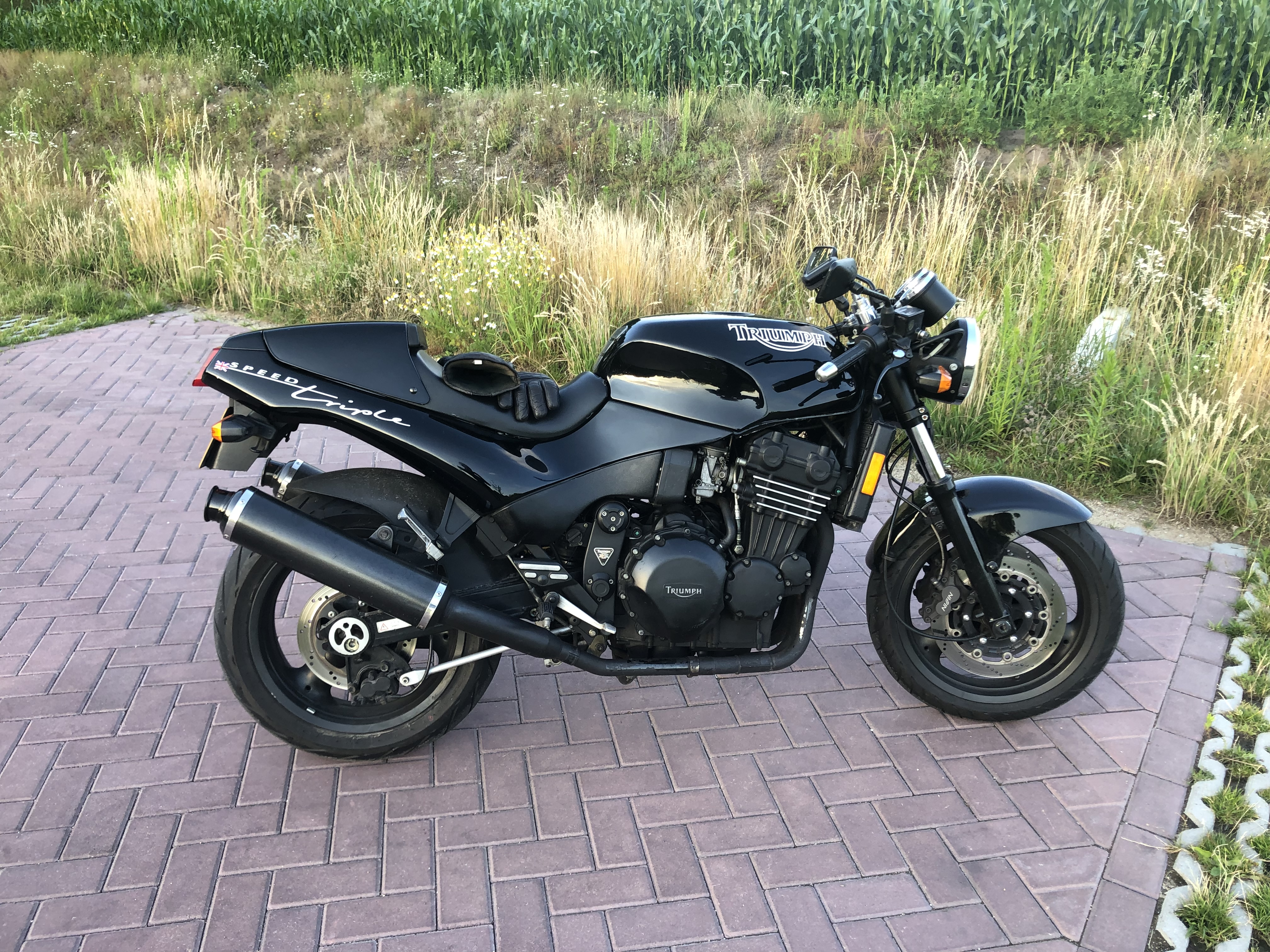
1994 Triumph Speed Triple T300

Early Speed Triples were all carburetted, and were designated T300 series bikes. 1994–1995 models came with the standard 885 cc water-cooled engine and a rugged five-speed transmission. Subsequent Speed Triples had the same engine with six speed transmissions, except for the brief run of 750 cc bikes. As with all the modular Triumphs, the T309 series Speed Triple had a very large single steel tube backbone frame, and used the engine as a stressed member. The forks were 43mm multi-adjustable Kayaba units and the same Japanese firm's shock could be set for preload and rebound damping. Kayaba had had a special relationship with the Hinckley Triumph since its creation. At the rear was a single monoshock with a progressive linkage, and at the front were standard hydraulic forks fitted with dual disc brakes.

=== Legacy ===
The final T309 Speed Triple was built in 1996. The newly introduced T595 Daytona was supplied with fuel injection and the 955 cc engine. The 1997 T509 received the frame, brakes, and design of the new Daytona 595, but came with an 885 cc injected engine for 1997 and 1998. The remainder of the range, including the Thunderbird, Legend, the Adventurer, the Thunderbird Sport, the Tiger, the Sprint and Sprint Sport, and the 900 trophy, retained the carbureted 885 cc engine.

== Generations ==
=== T509 ===
After the T309 Speed Triples, Triumph released the first of its new generation of fuel-injected sport bikes: the T509 Speed Triple, which was a complete redesign from its predecessor. While the all-new engine displaced 885 cc, it allegedly produced 108 hp (81 kW) and was fitted with an engine management system by SAGEM. The T509 had new aluminium perimeter chassis, a single-sided swingarm, and upgraded suspension components. The bike featured a Showa three-way adjustable rear shock and 45mm three-way adjustable Showa forks similar to those on the CBR900RR. Nissin 4 pot callipers were standard up front, and a single piston rear.

John Mockett and Rod Scivyer designed the new bike. The T509 had a polished frame and low mount clip-ons when it was introduced in 1997; it was switched to a regular handbar in 1998 to improve rider comfort and low speed handling.

When the T509 Speed Triple had an 885 cc fuel injected engine, the Daytona received an upgraded 955 cc engine that produced 130 hp (97 kW) at the crank. In 1999, the new Speed Triple was officially upgraded to 955 cc status and received the bigger engine. The engine was very similar to the unit found in the Sprint ST, but the motorcycle did not feature Nikasil lined cylinders. Different pistons and rods were used, and it was fitted with different camshafts than the Daytona. It did not exert as much power as the Daytona, but it had a substantially broader torque curve than its T509 predecessor.

Cosmetically, the T509 and the 1999 Speed Triples were nearly identical, and they shared many of the same components including the dual headlamps and single sided swing arm. Minor differences include the removal of the T509 decal on the rear quarter panel and the addition of a header cross-over pipe.

=== 955i ===
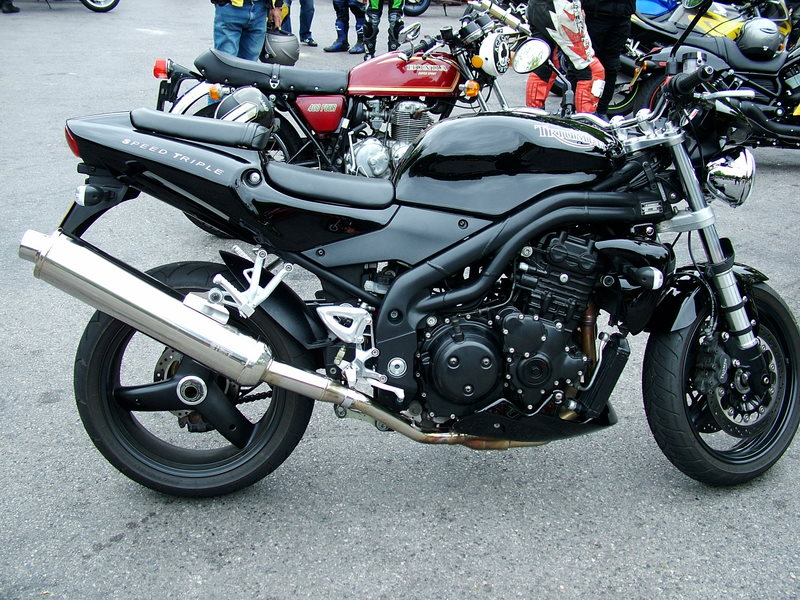
Triumph 955 Speed Triple

In 2000 and 2001, the Speed Triple did not change much beyond appearance; the engine control unit was updated to the Sagem MC2000. The 1997–99 bikes had a ground block known to fail, so the 2000 and 2001 bikes received an improved wiring harness. Both the Speed Triple and the Daytona were referred to as 955i bikes, which ended some confusion from the earlier T500 series designations. Other notable differences were silver wheels instead of black ones, and the Speed Triple logo on the rear quarter panel was in print rather than cursive.

In 2002, Gareth Davies redesigned the bodywork. The 432 lb (196 kg) was reduced by a change to the engine casings of the 955i engine that decreased weight by roughly 17 pounds. A new cylinder design slightly increased its power. The MC2000 control unit remained, but was adapted for an O2 sensor.

In late 2004, a small number of Special Edition Speed Triples (Speed Triple SE) were produced with only cosmetic differences.

From 1997 to 2004, the Nissin brakes were problematic. Although the 955i was initially praised as one of the best stopping bikes, many owners complained of brake sponginess. The calliper pistons were not adequately coated, which introduced dirt, debris, and corrosion. The pistons caught on the caliper seals and were pulled back into the calliper bore, which caused an excess amount of piston travel required to apply braking force giving a spongy feel.

=== 1050 2005 until 2016 ===
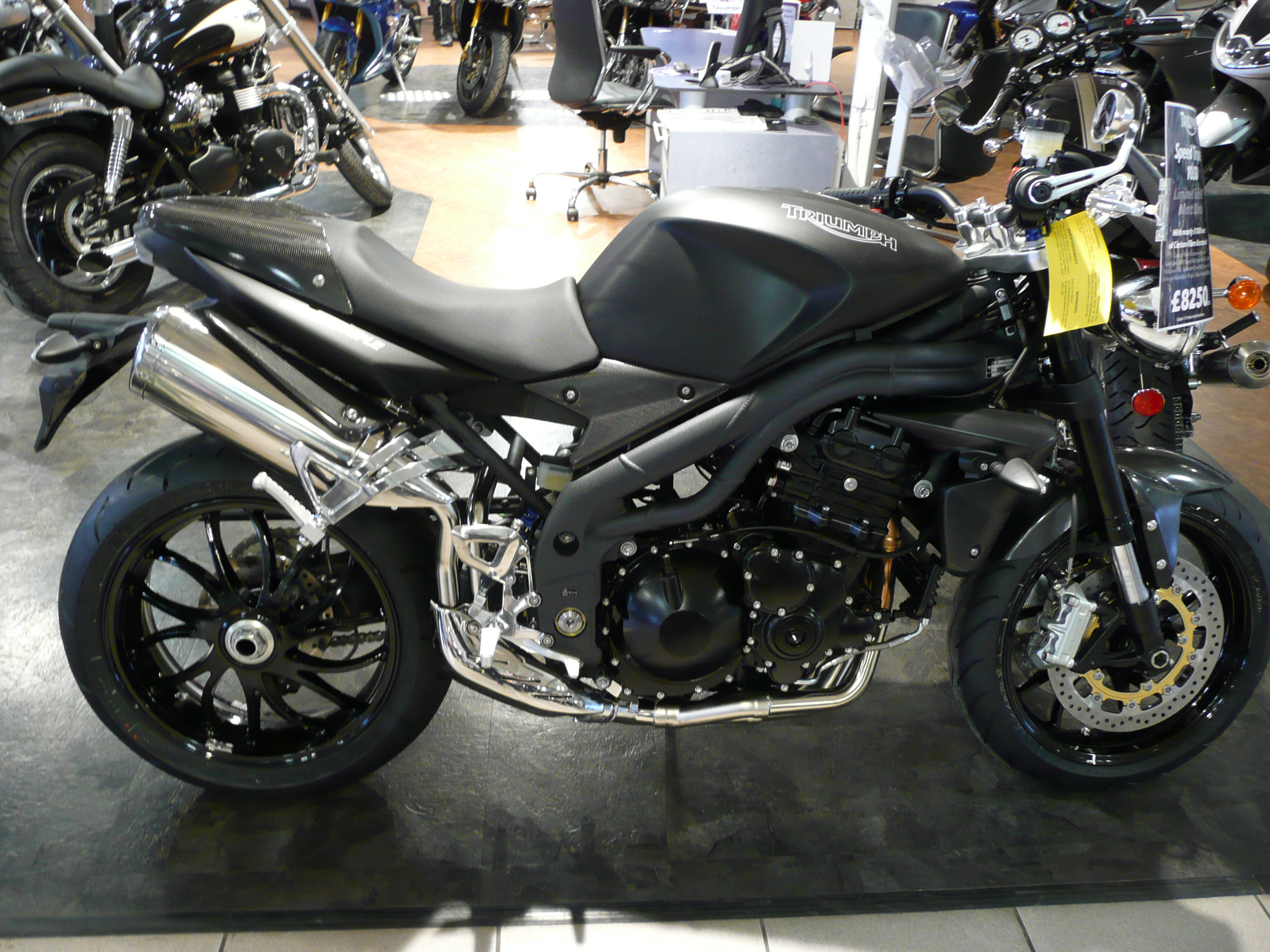
2009 Triumph Speed Triple 1050

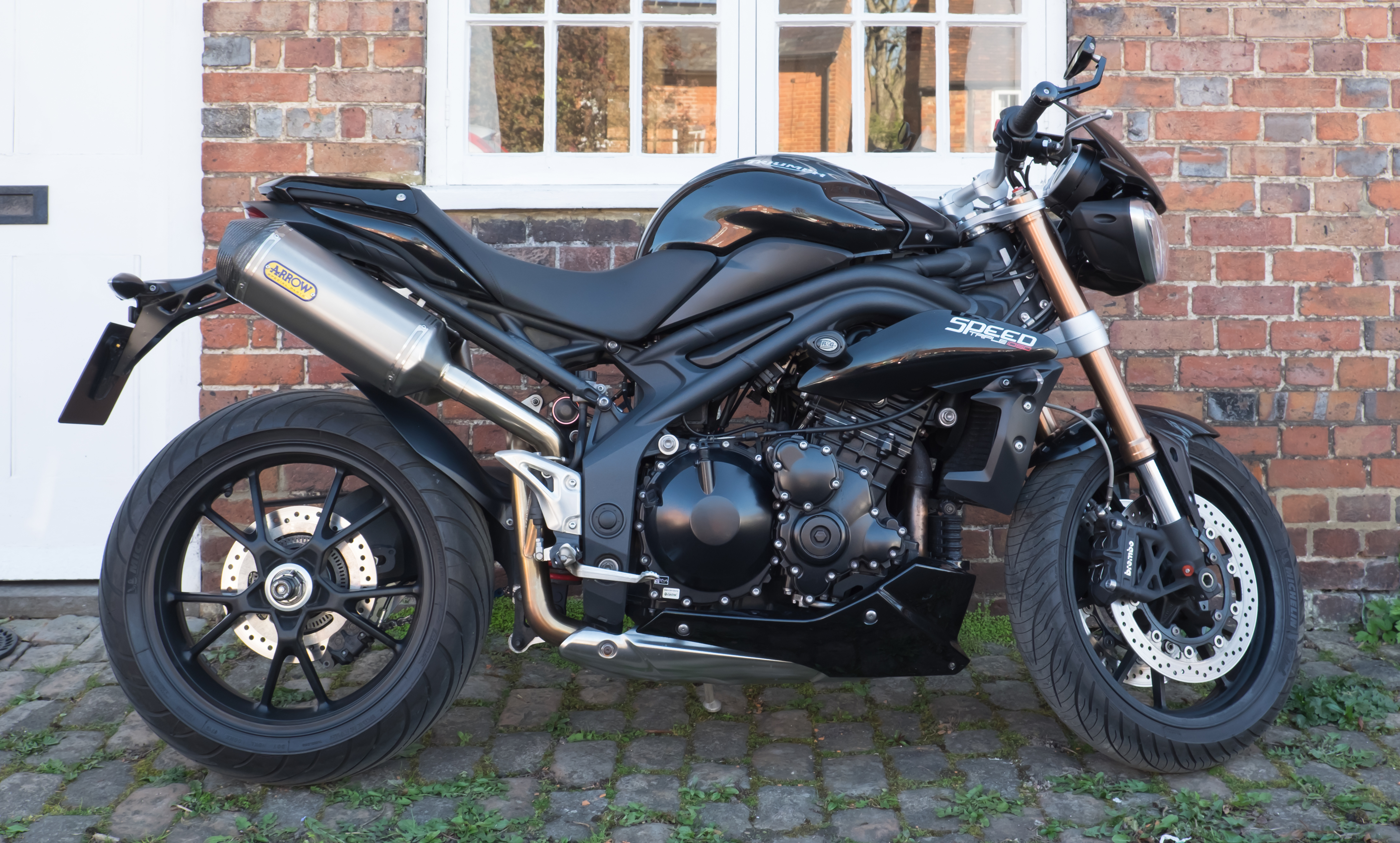
2011 Triumph Speed Triple 1050

In 2005, Triumph released its fourth-generation Speed Triple. The engine was still the same one used since 1997, but its capacity was increased to 1,050 cc by lengthening the stroke. It was also fitted with a fuel injection and engine management system made by the Keihin Corporation. Other engine modifications delivered a claimed 129 hp (96 kW) and a broader, flatter torque curve.

The 1050 was designed by Rodolfo Frascoli.

Other improvements included inverted forks, radial disc brake callipers, and a redesigned electronic gauge cluster which included a trip computer.

In late 2007, a few changes appeared in the Speed Triple, consisting of an updated engine management system and a revised exhaust containing a catalytic converter in a different location. The revised electronic control unit had more memory, and provided a solution for some starting and low-speed fueling issues. A metal tank replaced the plastic unit. For the 2008 model year, several changes were made to the bodywork, and Italian-made Brembo front brakes were supplied as standard.

The new Speed Triple shared its engine with the new Sprint ST and later the 2007 Triumph Tiger 1050.

Triumph celebrated the Speed Triple's fifteenth anniversary in 2010 with a limited-edition model that featured black paint with red trim and a number of optional accessories that were added as standard equipment. The bike was also the first production Triumph to feature the signature of company owner John Bloor. According to Triumph, more than 35,000 Speed Triples have been sold since the model was introduced in 1993.

=== 1050 2016 Until 2021 ===
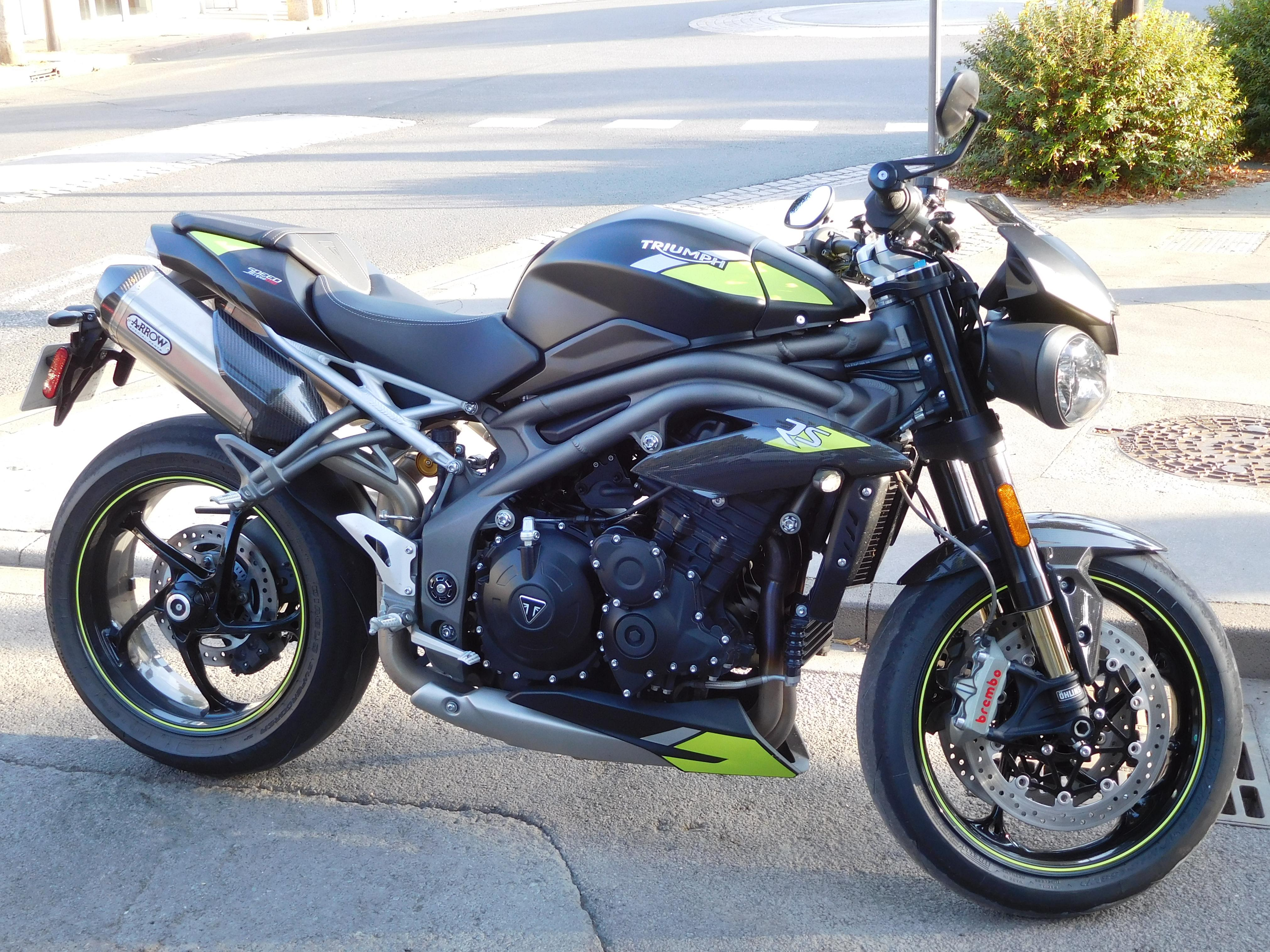
Triumph Speed Triple 1050 RS

In 2016, Triumph updated several aspects of the bike, including 104 changes to the engine. Ride-by-wire was added for the first time with five ride modes with traction control and an anti-lock braking system that can be turned on or off. The new Speed Triple has a wet weight of 212 kg (467 lb) and a claimed dry weight of 192 kg (423 lb). Triumph states the new Speed Triple develops 140 hp (100 kW) at 9,500 rpm, and 82.6 lb⋅ft (112.0 N⋅m) torque at 7,850 rpm.

In 2018 full color 5" TFT dashboard was introduced and power raised to 147 hp (110 kW) at 10,500 rpm.

=== 2021: 1200 RS ===
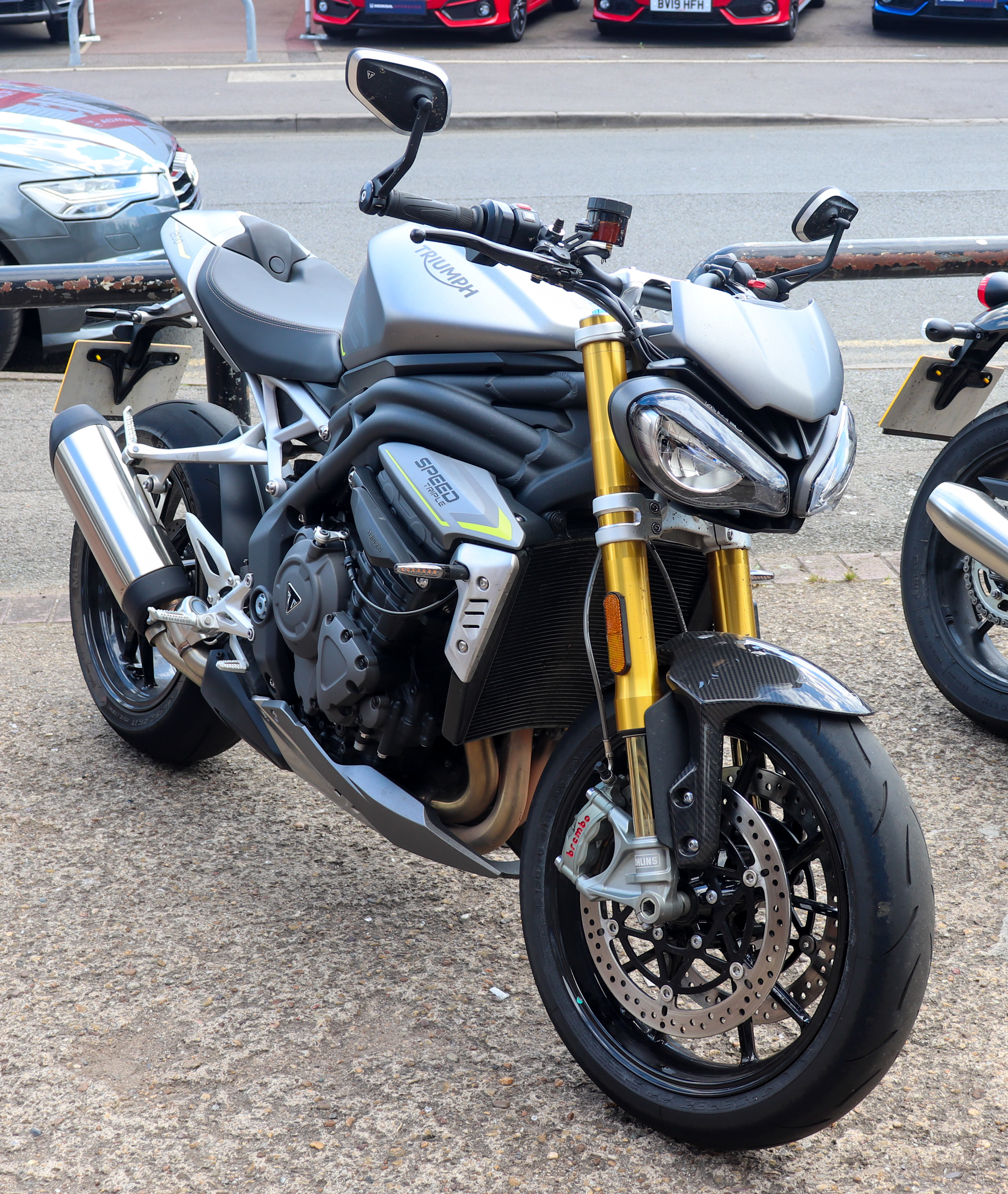
2021 Triumph Speed Triple 1200 RS

In 2021, Triumph redesigned the Speed Triple with a new 1160cc inline three engine, and designated it the 1200 RS. Output for the new engine was rated at 177hp (180PS) and 125Nm torque, lowering the wet weight to 198kg.

=== 2022: 1200 RR ===
For 2022, Triumph introduced the Speed Triple 1200 RR. Taking design cues from café racers, the 1200 RR mounts a redesigned front end, with a new single round headlight unit and bikini half-fairing. Intended as a road-oriented large-displacement sport bike, the 1200 RR has lowered, clip-on style handlebars and raised and rearward-set foot pegs (compared to its RS sibling), bringing the riding position closer to a traditional sportbike. In addition, the Öhlins suspension has been made electronically adjustable and semi-automatic, compared to the manually adjustable setup of the RS, with a new wet weight of 438 lb (199kg).
