= Triumph Sprint 900 =

British motorcycle

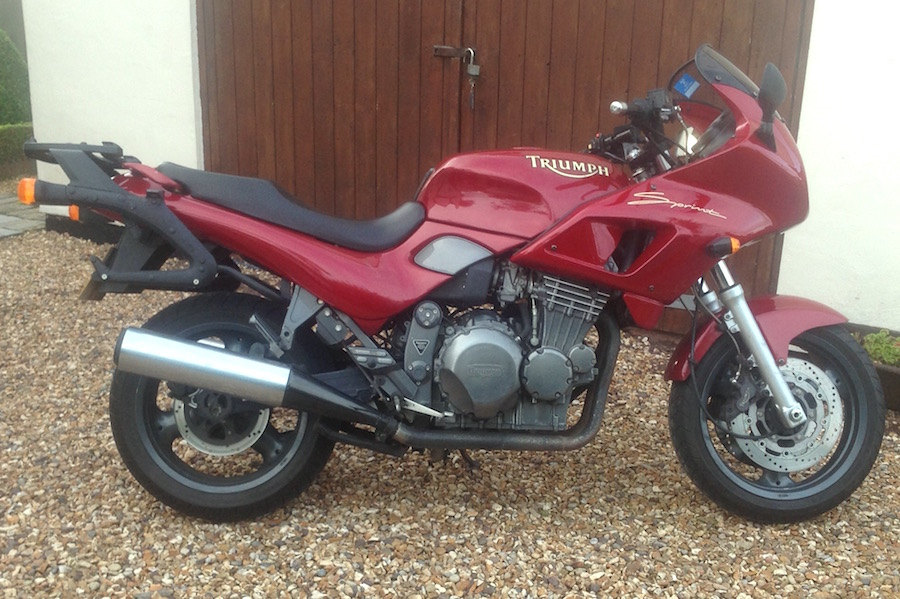
- Manufacturer: Triumph
- Production: 1991-1998
- Successor: Triumph Sprint ST
- Class: Sport touring motorcycle
- Engine: 885 cc (54.0 cu in) 4-stroke, inline-3, 4 valve per cylinder DOHC, liquid-cooled
- Bore / stroke: 76 mm × 65 mm (3.0 in × 2.6 in)
- Top speed: 140 mph (230 km/h)
- Power: 92 hp (69 kW) (claimed)
- Torque: 59 lb⋅ft (80 N⋅m) (claimed)
- Transmission: 6-speed
- Frame type: Steel spine frame
- Suspension: Front: 45 mm (1.8 in) forks with dual rate springs and adjustable preload, compression and rebound damping Rear: Monoshock with adjustable preload, rebound and compression damping
- Brakes: Front: Double disc. 4-piston callipers. 320 mm (13 in); Rear: Single disc. 2-piston callipers. 220 mm (8.7 in)
- Seat height: 780 mm (31 in)
- Weight: 215 kg (473.9 lb) (dry)
- Fuel capacity: 25 L; 5.5 imp gal (6.6 US gal)
- Related: Triumph Trident

The Triumph Sprint 900 is a sport touring motorcycle manufactured by Triumph from 1991 to 1998 at their factory in Hinckley, Leicestershire. Styled by Rod Skiver, the Sprint was powered by an 885 cc (54.0 cu in) liquid-cooled, inline-three four stroke engine. The engine was a similar triple to that in the Triumph Trident 900 and many of the cycle parts were interchangeable with the Trident.

Originally called the "Trident Sprint", it became the "Sprint 900" in 1995.The bike was succeeded by the Triumph Sprint RS, and also by the Triumph Sprint ST.

== Reception ==
One review declared that the Sprint was, "basically a Trident 900 with a cockpit fairing, but that didn't prevent it being a solid workhorse tourer".
