= Triumph Tiger 800 =

Model of motorcycle

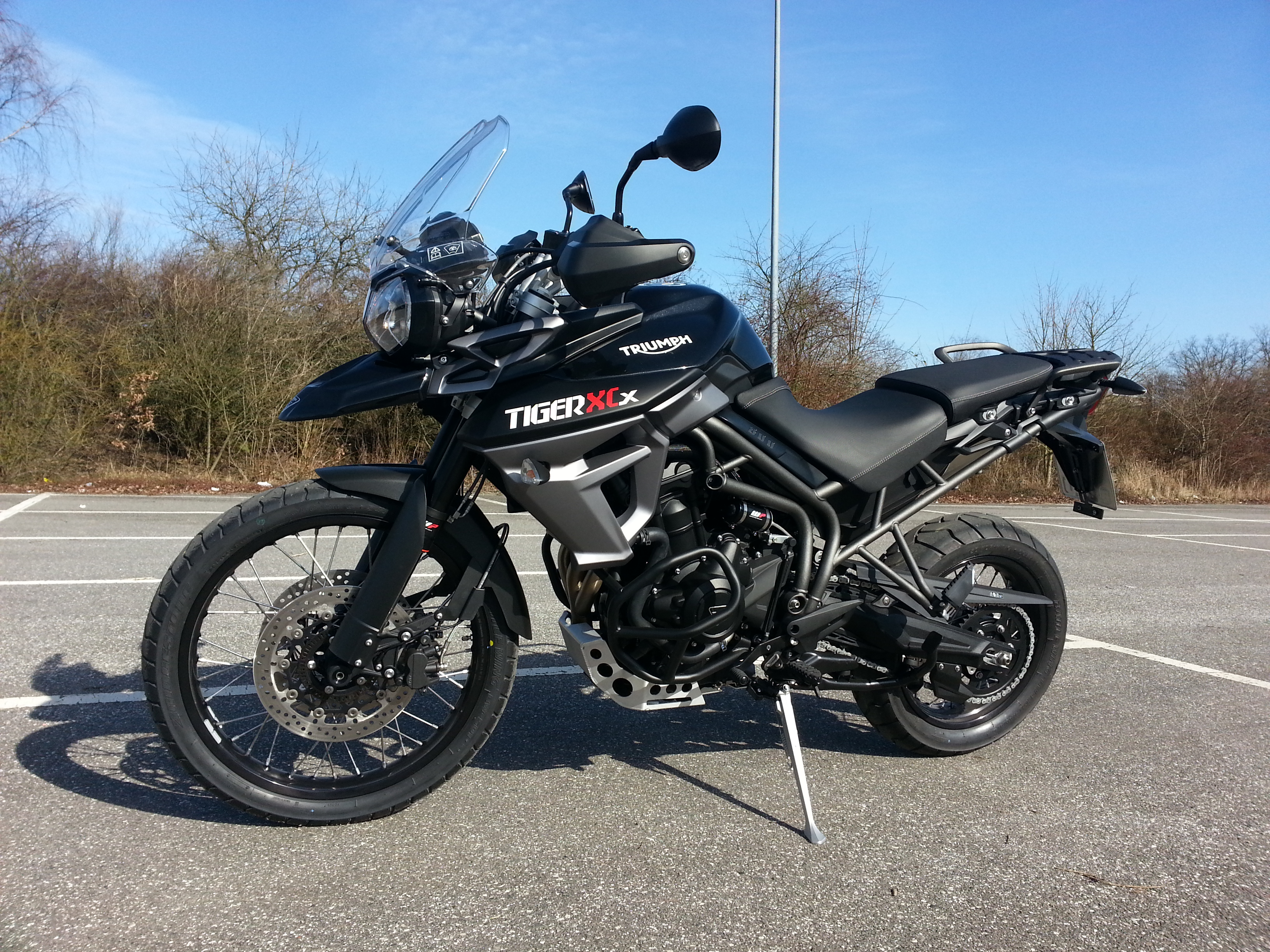
- Manufacturer: Triumph Motorcycles
- Production: 2010-2020
- Assembly: Hinckley, UK. Also Bangkok
- Successor: Triumph Tiger 900 II
- Class: Adventure motorcycle
- Engine: 799 cc (48.8 cu in), inline-3, 12-valve, DOHC
- Bore / stroke: 74.0 mm × 61.9 mm (2.91 in × 2.44 in)
- Top speed: 210 km/h (130 mph)
- Ignition type: Electronic
- Transmission: 6-speed, chain drive
- Frame type: Steel trellis
- Suspension: Front: Upside down forks Rear: Aluminium swingarm & mono-shock
- Brakes: Front: twin 308 mm floating discs, Nissin 2-piston sliding calipers, Rear: single 255 mm disc, Nissin single piston sliding caliper (Switchable ABS model available)
- Tyres: Front 800: 100/90ZR19; Front 800 XC: 90/90ZR21; Rear both: 150/70 ZR17
- Rake, trail: 800: 23.7°/86.2 mm 800 XC: 23.1°/91.1 mm
- Wheelbase: 800: 1,555 mm (61.2 in); 800 XC: 1,568 mm (61.7 in)
- Dimensions: L: 2,215 mm (87.2 in); W: 800: 795 mm (31.3 in); 800 XC: 865 mm (34.1 in); H: 800: 1,350 mm (53 in); 800 XC: 1,390 mm (55 in)
- Seat height: 800: 810–830 mm (32–33 in); 800 XC: 845–865 mm (33.3–34.1 in)
- Weight: 800: 203 kg (448 lb) (dry); 800: 210 kg (460 lb); 800 XC: 215 kg (474 lb) (wet)
- Fuel capacity: 19 L (4.2 imp gal; 5.0 US gal)
- Oil capacity: 3.5 L (3.7 US qt)
- Fuel consumption: 5.4 L/100 km (52 mpg_{‑imp}; 44 mpg_{‑US})

The Triumph Tiger 800 is a dual-sport motorcycle launched in 2010 by British manufacturer Triumph Motorcycles. The Tiger 800 XR is a more road-oriented bike, while the Tiger 800 XC is designed as a more off-road vehicle.

The product line was discontinued after 2019, and was replaced in 2020 by the Triumph Tiger 900.

== Model differences ==
There are a number of key differences between the two models. The XR has cast alloy wheels, with a 19-inch at the front, while the XC has spoked wheels with alloy rims and a larger 21-inch front. They have the same size of 17" at the rear.

The Tiger 800 XC has longer-travel suspension at the front and rear, with 45 mm forks, compared with 43 mm on the Tiger 800 XR. The Tiger 800 XR has a motorcycle saddle adjustable from 810 to 830 millimetres (32 to 33 in), while the Tiger 800 XC saddle is taller at 845 to 865 millimetres (33.3 to 34.1 in). The XC has more aggressive off-road looks, including a small beak-like high-level mudguard at the front, similar to the BMW F800GS, a bike the Tiger is designed to compete against. Overall the XC is longer, wider, taller and heavier than the XR. The Tiger 800 XC was named "Best Dual Sport" for 2011 by Cycle World.

Both models share most components, including the engine, 19-litre (4.2 imp gal; 5.0 US gal) fuel tank, instrument panel, steel trellis frame, and brakes, which have optional ABS.

== First generation (2010-2014) ==
The first generation came in two models, 800 and 800XC. Both bikes share the same frame and 799 cubic centimetres (48.8 cu in) inline-three engine, which is derived from the smaller Triumph Daytona 675. In both cases an official Triumph accessory low seat lowers seat heights by 20 mm. The 2011 model year featured a silver frame, but from 2012 to 2018 the Tiger had a black frame with the exception of SE (Special Edition) models that had a red frame and accessories.

== Second generation (2015-2016) ==
For the 2015 model year, the Tiger 800 used a second generation 800 cc engine with drive-by-wire throttle which Triumph claimed improved fuel economy by 17%. Traction control was also added. Optional versions of the Tiger 800 included various combinations of cruise control, auto-cancel indicators, an advanced trip computer, multiple driving modes. Hardware in some versions included engine-protection bars, an aluminium sump guard, a centre stand, and WP suspension, which included adjustable front forks.

== Third generation (2017-2019) ==
In 2018 Triumph launched a new generation of Tiger 800, claiming to have 200 undisclosed modifications from the previous generation. There are six models on two variants:

- Road-oriented: XR (base model), XRx, XRx LOW and XRt with cast aluminium alloy wheels and 19" front tire and Showa suspension
- Dual sport: XC (base model), XCx and XCA with spoke wheels and 21" front tire and WP suspension with longer travel

All version have switchable ABS, twin 305 mm front brake discs and single 255 mm disc, LCD screens with digital instruments. The top version add features like led lights, more ride modes, Brembo front brakes, color TFT screen, and heated grips and seat. The weight of the base XR version is 199 kg dry, while the top range XCA version is 208 kg.

The product line was discontinued after 2019, and was replaced in 2020 by the Triumph Tiger 900.

== See also ==
- List of Triumph motorcycles
