= Triumph Trident =

British motorcycle produced 1991–1998

Trident
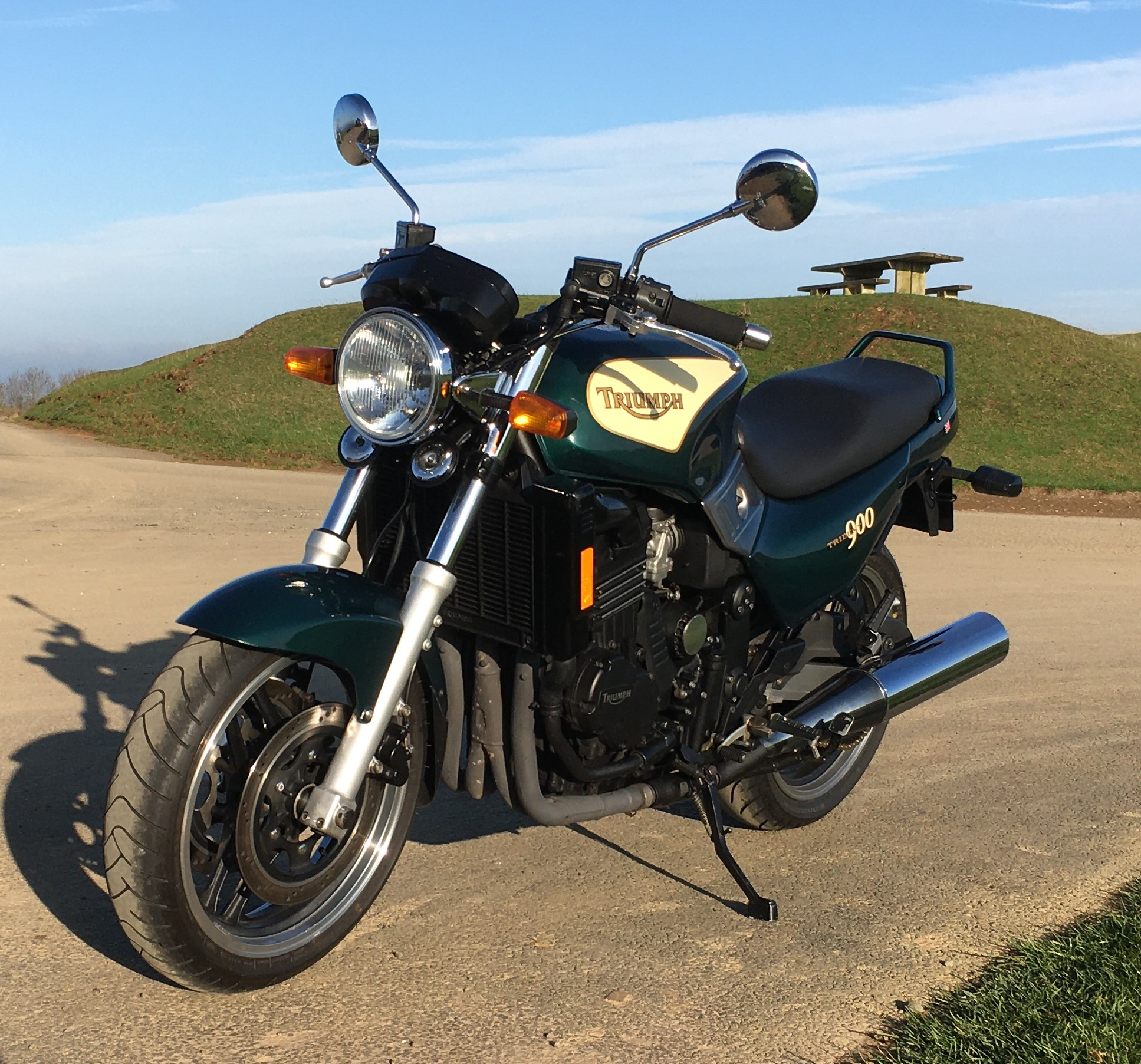
- Manufacturer: Triumph Motorcycles Ltd
- Production: 1991–1998
- Assembly: Hinckley
- Class: Standard motorcycle
- Engine: 885 cc (54.0 cu in) (750: 749 cc (45.7 cu in)) four-stroke triple
- Bore / stroke: 76 x 65 mm (750: 76 x 55 mm)
- Compression ratio: 10.6:1 (750: 11:1)
- Power: 100 PS (74 kW) at 9,000 rpm (750: 90 PS (66 kW) at 10,500 rpm)
- Torque: 79.9 N⋅m (58.9 lbf⋅ft) at 6,500 rpm (750: 66.6 N⋅m (49.1 lbf⋅ft) at 8,500 rpm
- Ignition type: Electronic
- Transmission: Six-speed
- Frame type: Tubular high-tensile steel
- Suspension: 43 mm telescopic forks, gas-pressurised rear monoshock
- Tires: 120/70R17 front, 160/60R18 rear
- Wheelbase: 59 in (1,490 mm)
- Seat height: 31 in (800 mm)
- Weight: 467 lb (212 kg) (dry); 527 lb (239 kg) (wet)
- Fuel capacity: 25 L (5.5 imp gal; 6.6 US gal) (includes 5 L (1.1 imp gal; 1.3 US gal) reserve)
- Related: Triumph Sprint 900

The Triumph Trident is a three-cylinder motorcycle of either 750 cc or 900 cc capacity. These bikes were produced from 1991 to 1998 at Hinckley, Leicestershire, England, by Triumph Motorcycles Ltd, the successor business to the defunct Triumph Engineering at Meriden Works, Warwickshire, England.

== Overview ==
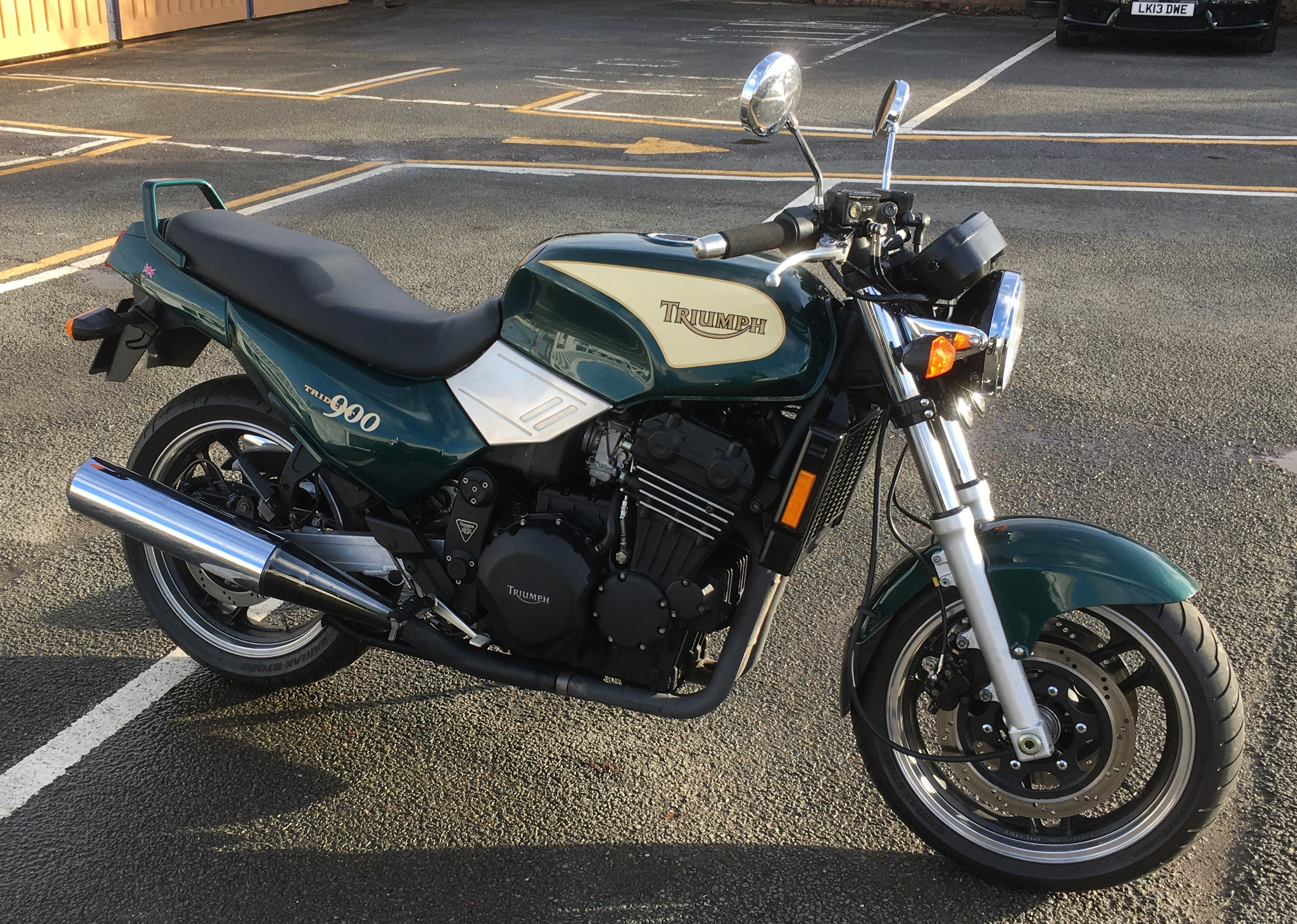
Triumph Trident 900 right side view

A range of new 750 cc and 900 cc triple-cylinder bikes (and 1,000 cc and 1,200 cc four-cylinder bikes) were launched at the September 1990 Cologne Motorcycle Show. The motorcycles used famous model names from the glory days of Meriden Triumph and were first made available to the public between March (Trophy 1200 being the first) and September 1991.

The Trident uses a modular liquid-cooled double overhead camshaft (DOHC) engine design in a steel frame (shared with the four-cylinder bikes) with a large-diameter backbone design. The modular design ensured that a variety of models could be offered whilst keeping production costs under control—an idea originally proposed, in air-cooled form, in the early 1970s by Bert Hopwood but not implemented by the (then) BSA-Triumph company.

=== Frame and cycle parts ===
The high-tensile steel tubular frame has a large diameter spine based on that of the Triumph Bonneville T140, though engine oil is not held in the frame. Japanese companies supplied cycle parts including Nissin (hydraulic disc brakes) and Showa or Kayaba for the front telescopic fork suspension.

== Development ==
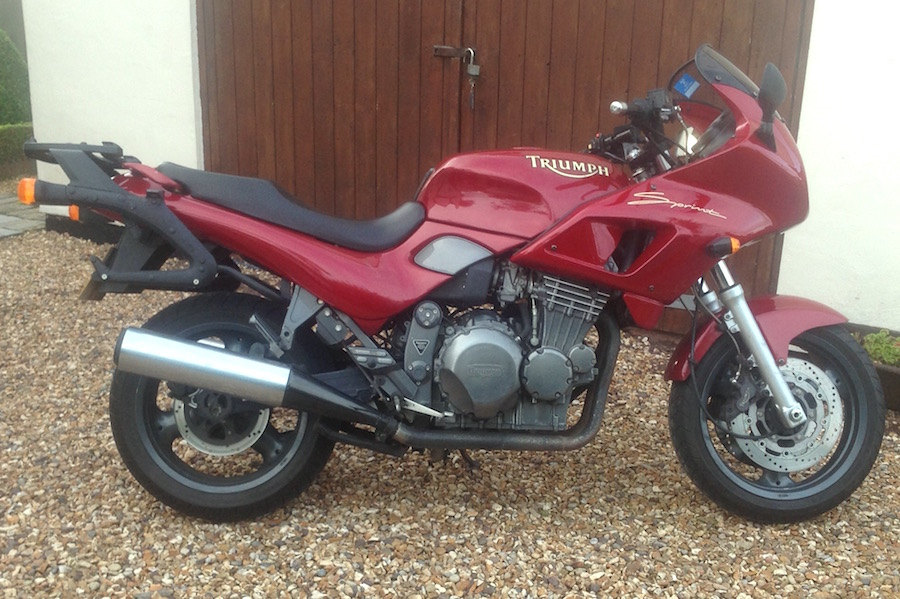
Sprint 900

The modular range of engines lent itself to the creation of further models, including the Sprint (a sports tourer), Daytona (a fully faired sport bike), and Daytona Sprint (a café racer).

In 1993 a twin-headlight cockpit fairing was added to create the Trident Sprint, by 1994 the Trident name had been exchanged for 'Sprint S' and at the end of 1996 this model became the 'Sprint Sports'. The final development of the Trident range was the 'Sprint Executive' of 1998 which featured a hard luggage system. The Sprint was in due course succeeded by the Sprint ST.

== Reception ==
Motor Cycle News declared in a 2010 review that the reborn Triumph Trident 900 "was one of the best of their early machines. The three-cylinder motor was distinctive, flexible and robust, the handling, though tall, better than the average roadster, and it was comfortable".

== See also ==
- Meriden Trident - the original motorcycle to use the name "Triumph Trident"
- List of Triumph motorcycles
