= Triumph Tiger 955i =

British motorcycle

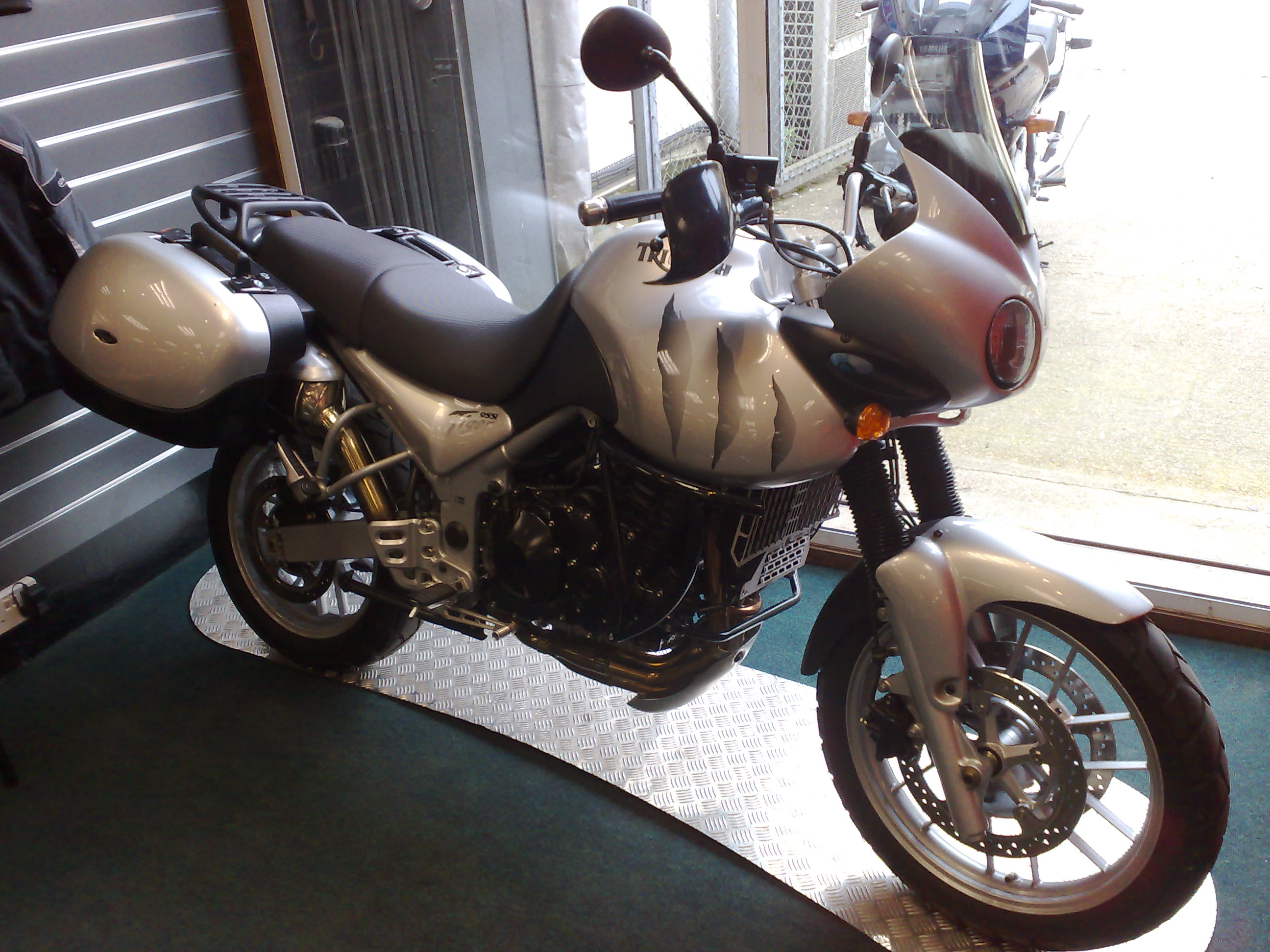
- Manufacturer: Triumph
- Also called: Triumph Tiger
- Production: 2001–2006
- Predecessor: Tiger T709
- Successor: Tiger 1050
- Class: Dual-sport
- Engine: 955 cc, 4-stroke inline 3-cylinder, fuel injection Bore/Stroke: 79.0 mm × 65.0 mm (3.11 in × 2.56 in)
- Power: 106.00 hp (79 kW) @ 9500 rpm
- Torque: 92.00 N⋅m (67.86 lb⋅ft) @ 4400 rpm
- Transmission: chain, 6-speed gearbox
- Brakes: Dual disc front brakes, diameter 310 mm (12 in); Single disc rear, diameter 285 mm (11.2 in)
- Tires: 110/80-R19 front, 150/70-R17 rear
- Wheelbase: 1,550 mm (61 in)
- Seat height: 875 mm (34.4 in)
- Weight: 215.0 kg (474.0 lb) (dry)
- Fuel capacity: 24 litres (5.3 imp gal; 6.3 US gal)

The Triumph Tiger 955i (T709EN) is a dual-sport motorcycle that was produced by Triumph Motorcycles between 2001 and 2006.

It was developed from the similar 885 cc Tiger T709 (1999–2000) which was also a fuel injected inline-triple. It was further developed into the Triumph Tiger 1050 of 2007.

The Tiger and other contemporary Triumph models were notable for pioneering plastic as a material for the fuel tank.

Tiger Models Overview

Year	Model Type	General
1993–1998	T400	885 cc
1999–2000	T709	885 cc, Fuel injected
2001–2006	T709EN (955i)	955 cc, Fuel injected
since 2007	1050	1,050 cc, Fuel injected

== See also ==
- List of Triumph motorcycles
- Tiger 900
