= Triumph Sprint ST =

British motorcycle

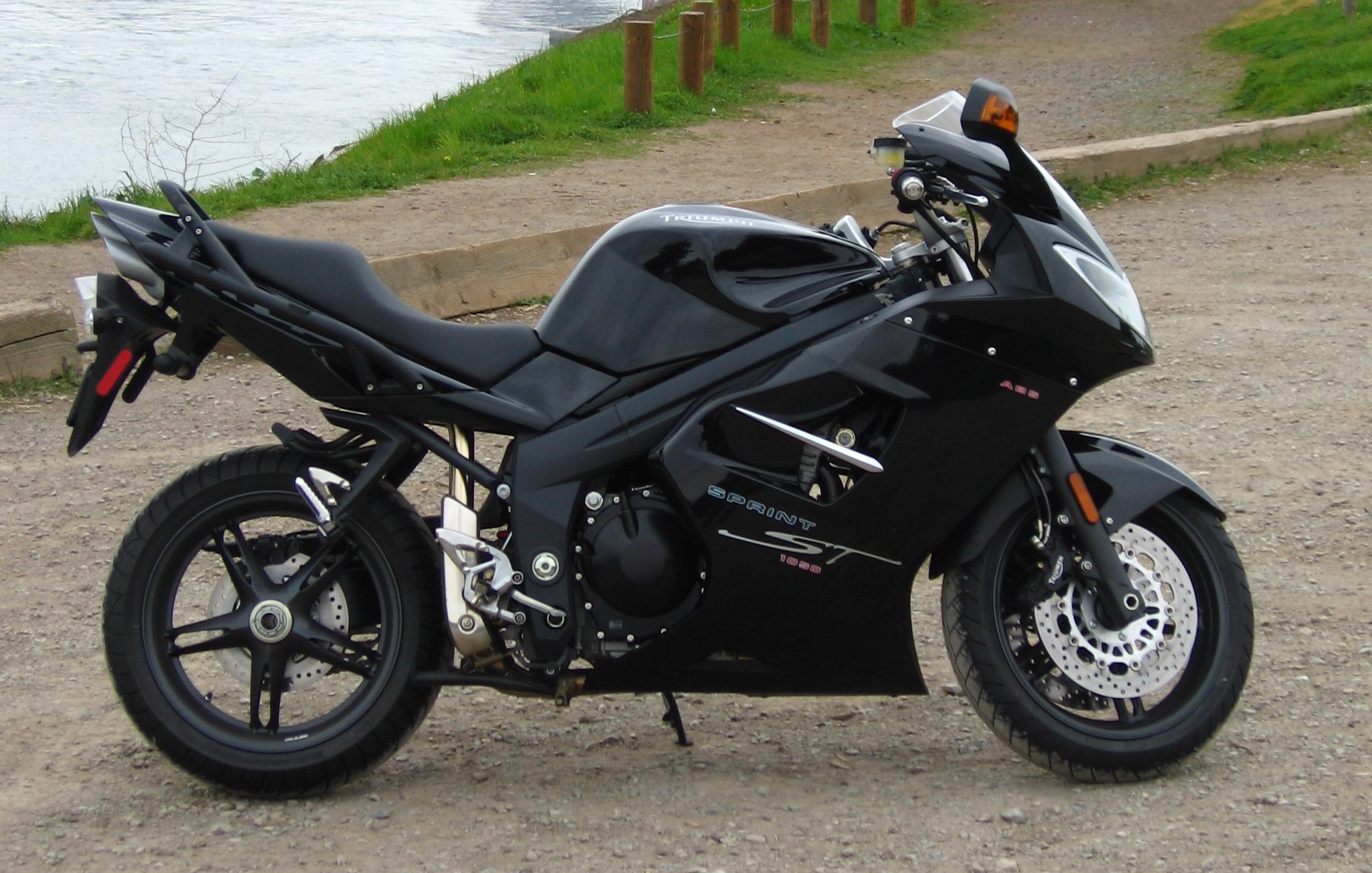
- Manufacturer: Triumph
- Production: 1998-2014; 1998-present (UK)
- Predecessor: Sprint 900
- Class: Sport touring bike
- Engine: Triple; 955 cc (58.3 cu in) 1998 - 2004; 1,050 cc (64 cu in) 2005 -
- Bore / stroke: 79.0 mm × 71.4 mm (3.11 in × 2.81 in)
- Top speed: 160 mph (260 km/h)
- Power: (1999) 81 kW (108 hp) (claimed) (1999) 66.6 kW (89.3 hp) (rear wheel) (2011) 95 kW (128 hp) (claimed) (2011) 87.8 kW (117.7 hp) (rear wheel)
- Torque: 103 N⋅m (76 lbf⋅ft) @ 7,500 rpm
- Transmission: 6-speed
- Frame type: Aluminium beam perimeter
- Suspension: Front: Showa 43 mm cartridge forks with dual rate springs and adjustable preload 127 mm travel Rear: Showa monoshock with adjustable preload and rebound damping, 119 mm travel
- Brakes: Front Brakes: Twin 320 mm floating discs, Nissin 4 piston callipers (ABS model available); Rear Brakes: Single 255 mm disc, Nissin 2 piston sliding calliper (ABS model available)
- Rake, trail: 24 degree
- Wheelbase: ST: 1,457 mm (57.4 in); GT: 1,537 mm (60.5 in)
- Dimensions: L: ST: 2,114 mm (83.2 in); GT: 2,260 mm (89 in); W: 750 mm (30 in)
- Seat height: 805 mm (31.7 in)
- Weight: 210 kg (460 lb); ABS model: 213 kg (470 lb) (dry) (1999) 230 kg (507 lb)(wet) (2011) 270.1 kg (595.5 lb) (wet)
- Fuel capacity: 20 L (4.4 imp gal; 5.3 US gal)

The Triumph Sprint ST is a sport touring motorcycle manufactured in the United Kingdom by Triumph between 1999 and 2010. Sporting a 1050cc 4-stroke three-cylinder engine, an alloy-beam frame and a single-sided swingarm, the Sprint ST competed effectively in the market against the Honda VFR800. In 2010 the Sprint ST was succeeded by the Triumph Sprint GT.

== Design and development ==
=== 955 cc (T695) ===
The Sprint ST was first introduced in 1999 as a complete redesign of the earlier Sprint 900 (1993–1998) styled by Rod Scivyer. It used the 955 cc straight-three engine similar to those found in the contemporaneous Speed Triple and Daytona models, only slightly detuned for smoother power delivery. Claimed power was 97 bhp (72 kW), later increased to 105 bhp (78 kW).

The model's appearance remained mostly unchanged from its introduction in 1999. An engine revamp with the assistance of Lotus in 2002 increased output to 118 bhp (88 kW) at 9100rpm and 100 N⋅m (74 lbf⋅ft) of torque at 5100rpm from a lighter engine—the bike is 207 kg (456 lb) dry.

=== 1,050 cc ===
In 2005, Triumph introduced a redesigned Sprint ST based around the same inline triple, increased in stroke to yield a displacement of 1,050 cc (64 cu in) and with a new fuel injection system. Power output increased to (123 hp / 90 kW @ 9250 rpm), with torque of (104 Nm / 77 ft-lb @ 5000 rpm). The 1050 ST redesigned chassis had a shorter wheelbase, the instrument cluster was modernised with miles-per-gallon and miles-to-empty displays, triple exhaust pipes were tucked under the seat, the headlights were completely redesigned and LED tail-lights added. Also, a range of options including pannier mounts and anti-lock brakes (ABS 2006 onwards) became available.

In 2007 some changes were made to the standard trim of the Sprint ST, including colour-matched panniers, handlebar risers and an improved windscreen. In 2008 the original composite fuel tank was replaced by a steel item of the same size and shape to enable the use of magnetic tank bags. Other 2008 changes included a new headlamp design and new footrests with more durable rubber. The Sprint ST continued in production until 2010, when it was replaced by the Sprint GT.

== Triumph Sprint GT ==
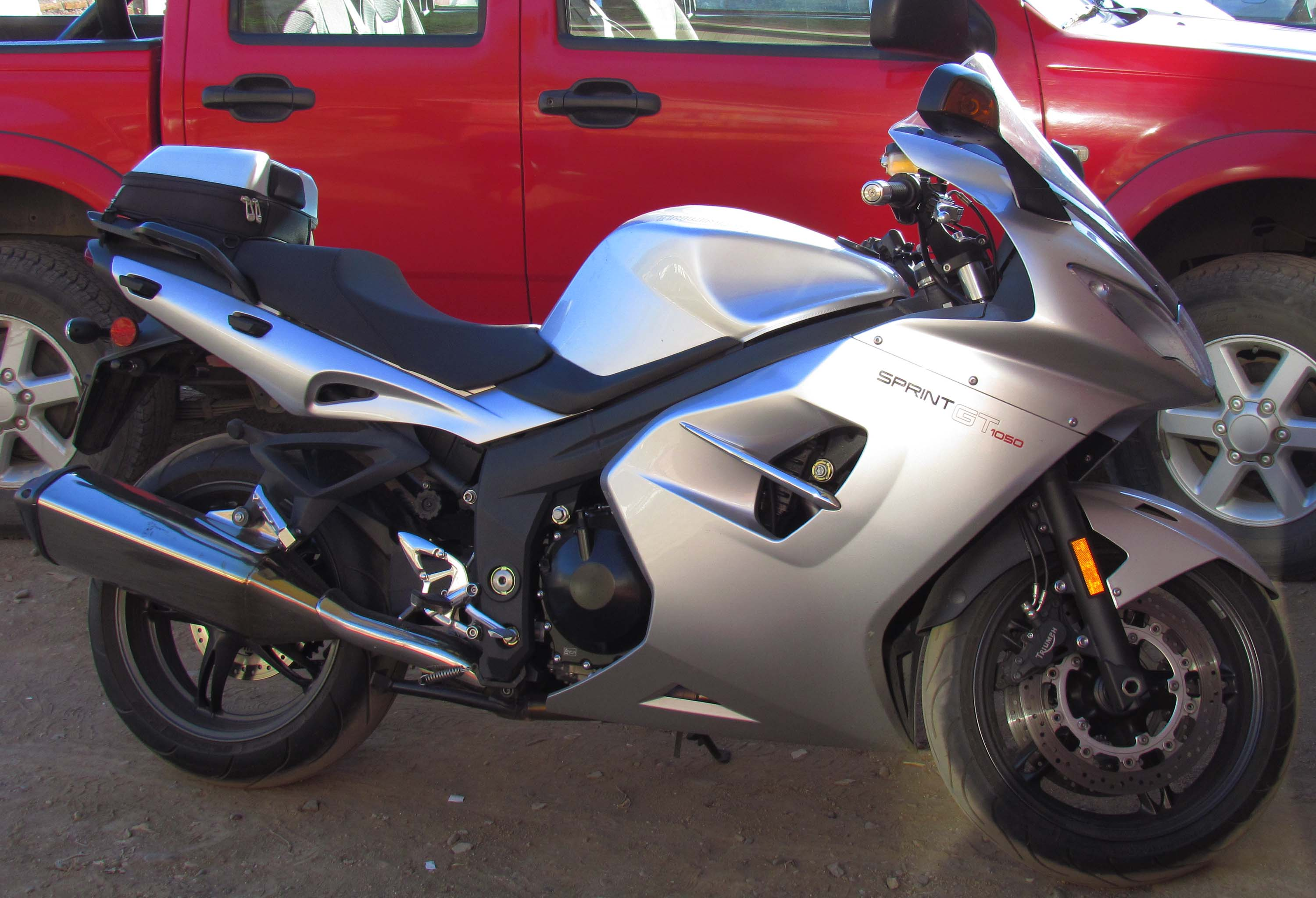
Triumph Sprint GT 1050

In 2010, the Triumph Sprint GT (Grand Tourer) was launched with a change of emphasis. Compared to the class-leading ST (Sports Tourer), the GT was more focused on two-up touring, with a longer wheelbase, more weight and a better pillion provision.

The engine was a revised version of the 1050 triple with more power (128 hp / 96 kW @ 9200 rpm) and torque (108 Nm / 80 ft-lb @ 6300 rpm) though the peak torque was produced at significantly higher revs than before. The power changes were as a result of use of an uprated ECU, the elimination of the 1050 ST's signature triple under-seat exhaust in favour of a side-mounted 3-into-1 exhaust, and a revised throttle body intake. The highest gear was made 7% taller than the ST to allowing for more relaxed highway cruising, giving an engine speed at a steady 110 km/h (68 MPH) of just over 4,000 rpm. The GT chassis was nearly 6 inches longer than the ST, with an overall length of 2260mm (89.0 inches) compared to the ST with 2114mm (83.2 inches); and the GT's wheelbase is 1537mm (60.5 inches) compared to the ST's 1457mm (57.4 inches).

The GT's front and rear suspension were Showa units. The front forks had stiffer springs to cope with the extra weight, while the rear suspension featured spring preload and rebound damping adjustability. These modifications added 7 kg (15 lb) to the weight of the bike, which now had a hefty kerb weight of 265 kg (584 lb). The GT received new headlamps based on reflectors rather than the ST's projector units, and had the anti-lock brakes (ABS) that had been optional on the ST 1050. The longer chassis allowed pillion footpegs to be repositioned to be more accommodating for a passenger. Removing the ST's under-seat silencers to a conventional position allowed the reshaped pillion seat to be lower. Uprated hard panniers were a standard fitting, with a 55-litre top box available as a factory option. These panniers were more robust and much larger than the ST's: (31 litres each vs. 22 litres).

The GT has changed little since its introduction in 2010, although a new SE Special Edition included as standard previously optional accessories such as a gel "Comfort Seat". After 2014 the GT was no longer available outside the UK, but as of 2017, the Triumph Sprint GT SE is still in production for the home Market.

== Reception ==
Motor Cycle News called the pre-2005 Sprint a "superb British all 'rounder which pipped Honda’s VFR800 simply by using a straight bat when the VFR tried all kinds of trick but ultimately unnecessary technology". Of the 2005 model, MCN wrote, "The Triumph Sprint ST is the best sports-touring motorcycle of its generation by some margin. It’s smooth, long-legged, comfortable and handsome, with effortless power to shrink distances with delightful ease."
