= Triumph Tiger 900 (2020) =

Middle-weight dual-sport motorcycle

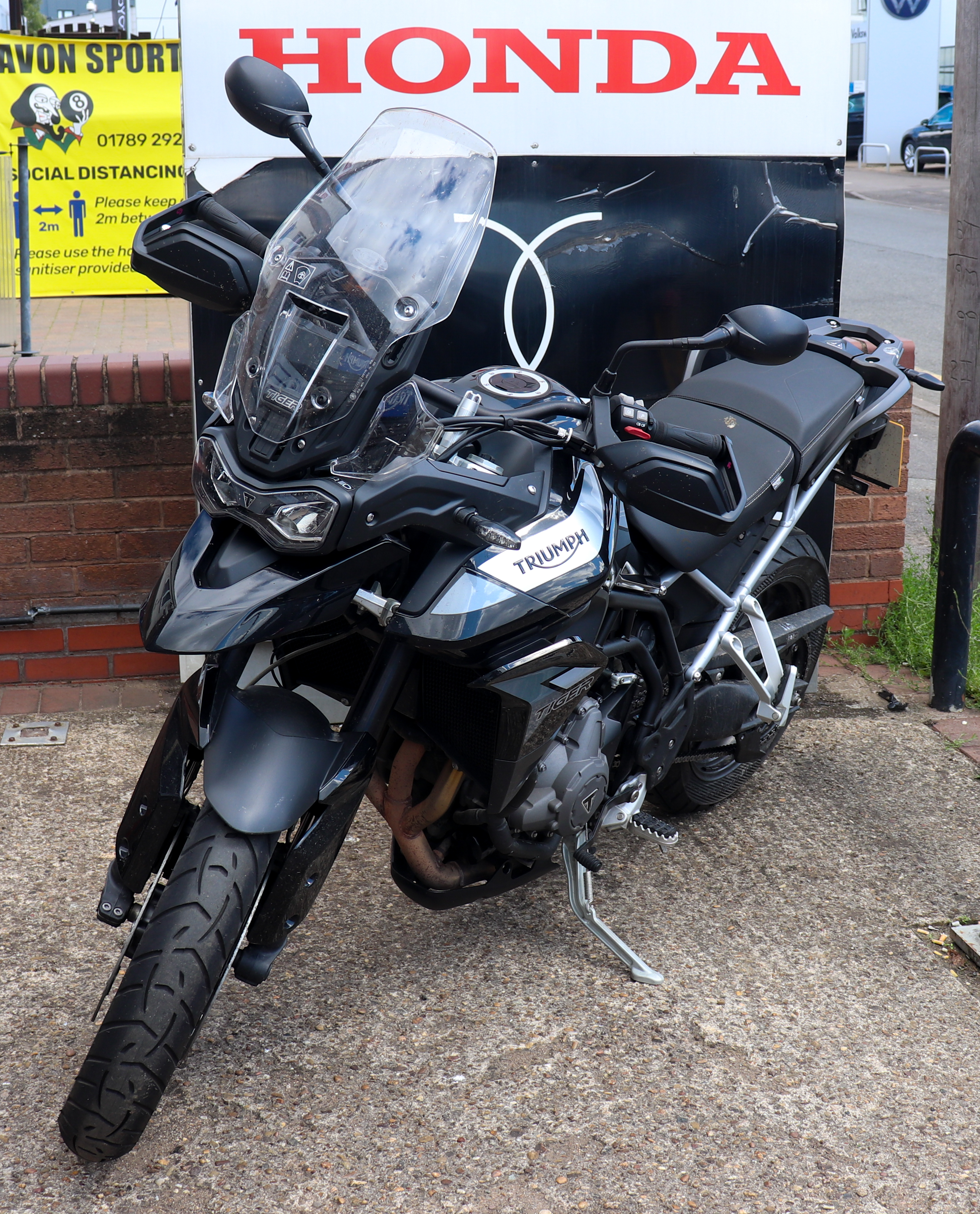
- Manufacturer: Triumph Motorcycles
- Production: 2020
- Assembly: Thailand, Bangkok
- Predecessor: Triumph Tiger 800
- Class: Adventure motorcycle
- Engine: 888 cc (54.2 cu in), inline-3, 12 valve, DOHC
- Bore / stroke: 78 mm × 61.9 mm (3.07 in × 2.44 in)
- Compression ratio: 11.27:1
- Top speed: 202-205 km/h
- Transmission: Wet, multi-plate clutch; 6 speed
- Frame type: Tubular steel frame, bolt on sub frame
- Brakes: Front: Twin 320mm floating discs, Brembo Stylema 4 piston Monobloc calipers Rear: Single 255mm disc. Brembo single piston sliding caliper
- Tyres: Front: 100/90-19; Rear: 150/70R17
- Rake, trail: 24.6˚, 133.3 mm
- Wheelbase: 1556 mm
- Dimensions: W: 930 mm (handlebars); H: 1410-1460 mm (without mirrors)
- Seat height: 820-840mm (GT), 860-880mm (Rally Pro)
- Weight: 192kg (850), 194 kg (900) (dry); 214 kg (850 sport), 219 kg (GT), 222kg (GT Pro, Rally Pro) (wet)
- Fuel capacity: 20L
- Oil capacity: 3.2–4 Liters (including filter change)

The Triumph Tiger 900 is a middle-weight dual-sport motorcycle introduced in 2020 by British manufacturer Triumph Motorcycles. While there was a motorcycle called the Triumph Tiger 900 (T400) manufactured from 1993 to 1998, this model is a completely new design intended as a successor of the Triumph Tiger 800 (which it has a similar appearance to).

The Tiger 900's upgrades included a higher-capacity 900 cubic centimetres (55 cu in) engine, a larger 5.3-gallon fuel tank, and LED lighting. Additionally, major updates were made to the suspension, and new Brembo disc brakes were added. Rider Magazine described its "T-plane" triple crankshaft as "a first in the motorcycling world, near as we can tell". On the GT, GT Pro, Rally, and Rally Pro, there is also a 7 inches (18 cm) and 850 Sport is 5 inches (12.7 cm) TFT display, cornering anti-lock brake system, and cornering traction control system. The manufacturer's price for the 850 sport is $12,290, base model is $12,500, for the GT Pro is $16,200, and for the Rally Pro is $16,700.

There are seven variants: the 850 sport, base model, GT, GT Low, GT Pro, Rally, and Rally Pro.

== Tiger GT ==
The "street-oriented" GT models (the GT, GT Low and GT Pro) were intended to be "way more of a road bike", and were designed for "urban adventures" including long-distance touring; like the base model, they come with cast wheels. The GT Low (short for "Low Ride Height") has a specialized suspension and lower seat height. ZigWheels called it "beautifully balanced", although not "as adept as the Rally on a trail". The GT Pro's front wheel is 19 inches (48 cm).

== Tiger Rally ==
The "dirt-oriented" Rally models (the Rally and Rally Pro) were intended to be "way more of an off-road bike"; they come with tubeless spoke wheels. They were described by ZigWheels as "the all terrain conquering variant of Triumph's middleweight adventure series", and a "massive upgrade" over the Tiger 800 XCx. The Rally's seat is 40 millimetres (1.6 in) higher than the GT. The manufacturer's claimed curb weight for the Rally Pro was 443 pounds (201 kg). The Rally Pro's front wheel is 21 inches (53 cm).

== See also ==
- List of Triumph motorcycles
