= Triumph Tiger 1050 =

British motorcycle

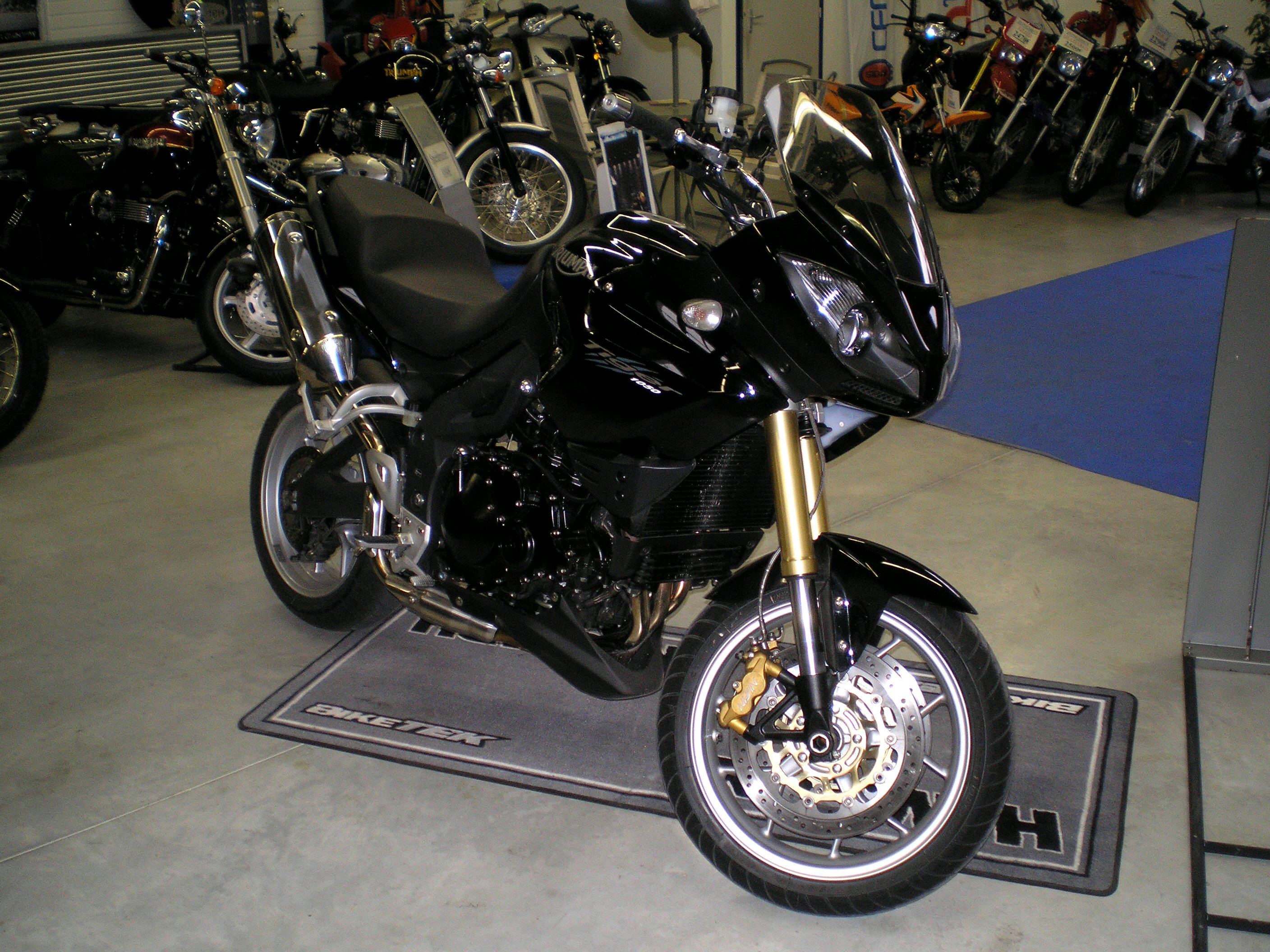
- Manufacturer: Triumph Motorcycles
- Production: 2007–2012
- Predecessor: Tiger 955i
- Engine: 1,050 cc, Liquid-cooled, DOHC, in-line 3-cylinder Multipoint sequential electronic fuel injection
- Bore / stroke: 79 mm × 71.4 mm (3.11 in × 2.81 in)
- Compression ratio: 12.0:1
- Power: 113 bhp (84 kW) @ 9,400 rpm
- Torque: 100 N⋅m (74 lb⋅ft) @ 6,250 rpm
- Transmission: X ring chain, 6 speed gearbox
- Suspension: Front: 43 mm upside down forks with adjustable pre-load, rebound and compression damping Rear: Monoshock with adjustable preload and rebound damping
- Brakes: Front: Twin 320 mm floating discs, 4-piston radial callipers Rear: Single 255 mm disc, 2 piston calliper
- Wheelbase: 1,550 mm (61 in)
- Dimensions: L: 2,110 mm (83 in); W: 840 mm (33 in); H: 1,320 mm (52 in)
- Seat height: 835 mm (32.9 in)
- Weight: 198 kg (437 lb) (ABS 201 kg (443 lb) (dry)
- Fuel capacity: 20 litres (4.4 imp gal; 5.3 US gal)

The Triumph Tiger 1050 is a continuation of the Triumph Tiger motorcycle model line from the Triumph Tiger 955i produced in Hinckley, England by Triumph Motorcycles. The model name is derived from Triumph's long history of sporting motorcycles of both single and twin cylinder design and of previous capacities from 350 cc to 750 cc. This model has a three-cylinder engine derived from the previous dual purpose Tiger. The Tiger 1050 shifts more towards the sport/street-oriented use from previous models. This is most easily seen with the use of cast 17-inch wheels. Radial front brakes (four-piston) and floating front discs are also indicators of the more sport oriented role of the Tiger 1050.

First launched in 2007, it was released to the press the previous November. Also available with ABS.

In 2009, Triumph introduced a special edition version that includes ABS brakes, the two-box pannier kit and handguards.

Tiger Models Overview

Year	Model Type	General
1993–1998	T400	885 cc
1999–2000	T709	885 cc, Fuel Injected
2001–2006	T709EN	955 cc, Fuel injected
since 2007	1050	1,050 cc, Fuel injected

== See also ==
- Tiger 900
- List of Triumph motorcycles
