= Sport touring motorcycle =

Type of motorcycle

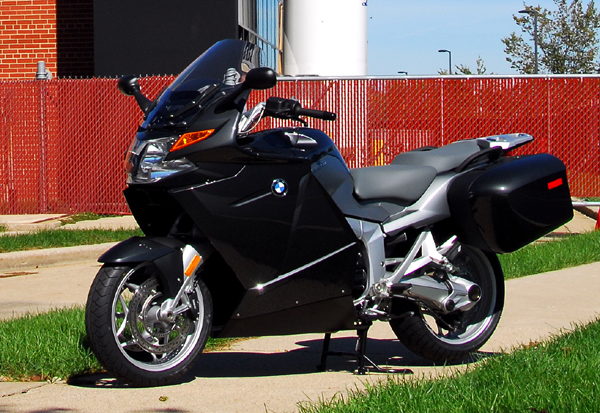
BMW K1200GT sport touring motorcycle

A sport touring motorcycle (sometimes a "sports tourer") is a type of motorcycle that combines the performance of a sport bike with the long-distance capabilities and comfort of a touring motorcycle.

The first sport tourer is said to be the fully faired 1977 BMW R100RS. Journalist Peter Egan defines the sport tourer as a "café racer that doesn't hurt your wrists and a touring bike that doesn't feel like a tank," and identified the R100RS as the first example he owned.

Unlike a sport model, a sport touring model will typically have more wind protection with larger fairings and an adjustable windscreen, a transmission with lower gearing, a shaft drive instead of chain drive, side and/or rear pannier storage systems, a larger alternator for more accessories, heated handlebar grips, remotely adjustable headlights, a larger fuel tank for increased range, and a more upright seating position. Unlike a full touring model, a sport tourer will typically have more ride height ground clearance for better cornering, less stowage, lower weight, a less relaxed seating position, less room for the rear passenger, and higher overall performance.

When designing a sport tourer, some manufacturers make economies by using an existing engine, technology and tooling from their recent sport bikes, rather than creating a dedicated engine design from scratch. Sport tourer engines could be differently-tuned versions of their sport bike siblings, the emphasis becoming mid-range torque rather than peak horsepower. This often includes a different cylinder head and exhaust system. For example, the Triumph Sprint motorcycle shared its engine with the Daytona, Speed Triple, and Tiger models; the Kawasaki 1400GTR/Concours 14 shares the basic engine with the Kawasaki Ninja ZX-14; and Ducati's ST4 sport tourer used the 916's engine; the Aprilia RST1000 Futura used a differently-tuned engine from the Aprilia RSV Mille sport bike. As consumer expectations changed, some sport bikes were redefined (for marketing purposes) as sport touring bikes, for example, the 2000 Kawasaki ZX-6R sportbike became the 2004 ZZR600 with just a change to a fairing bracket.

Rider magazine noted in 2013 that the line between sportbikes and touring motorcycles was becoming blurred "with [touring] horsepower rising higher and higher and lists of standard [sportbike] features growing longer and longer".

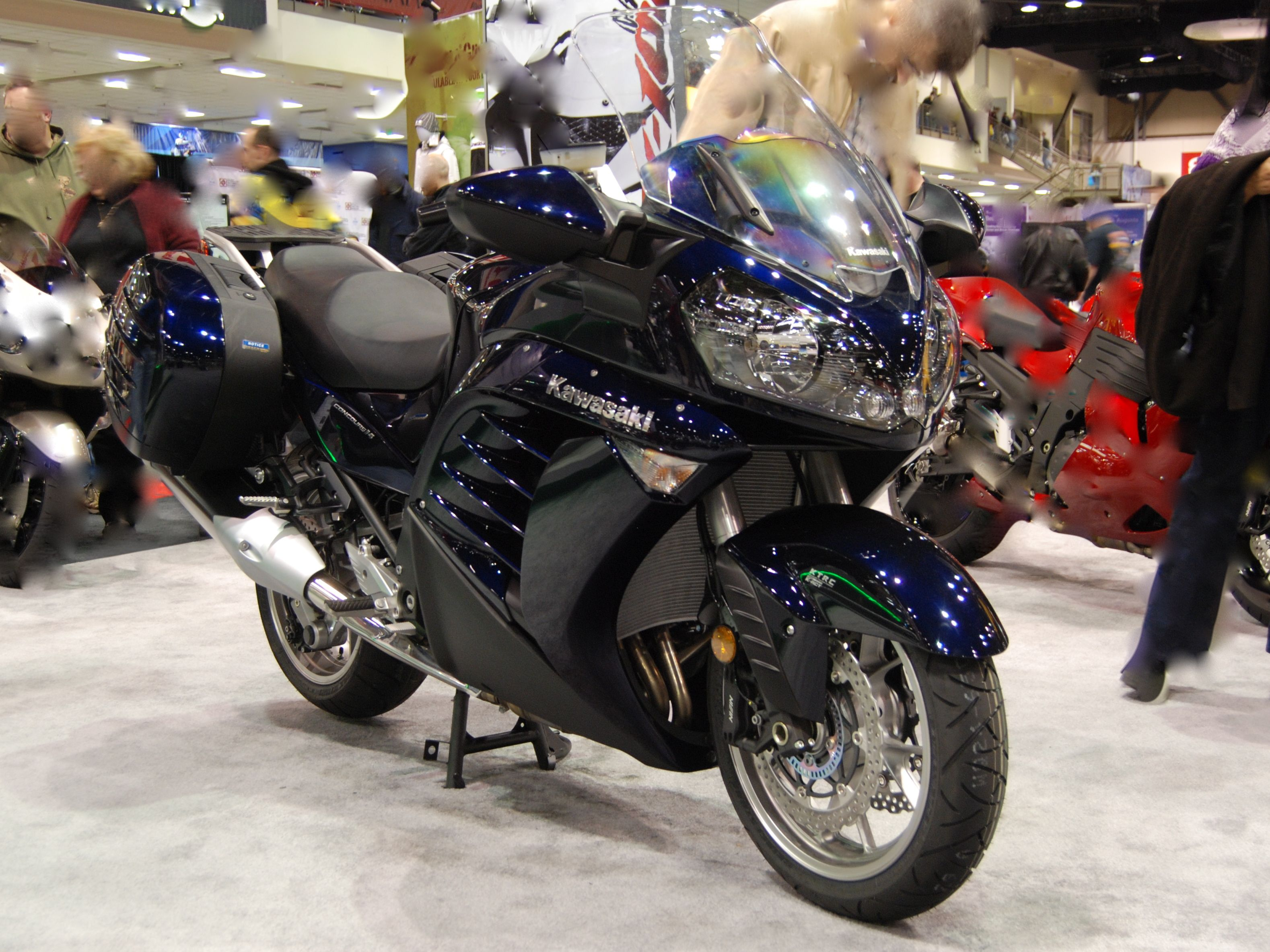
Kawasaki 1400GTR

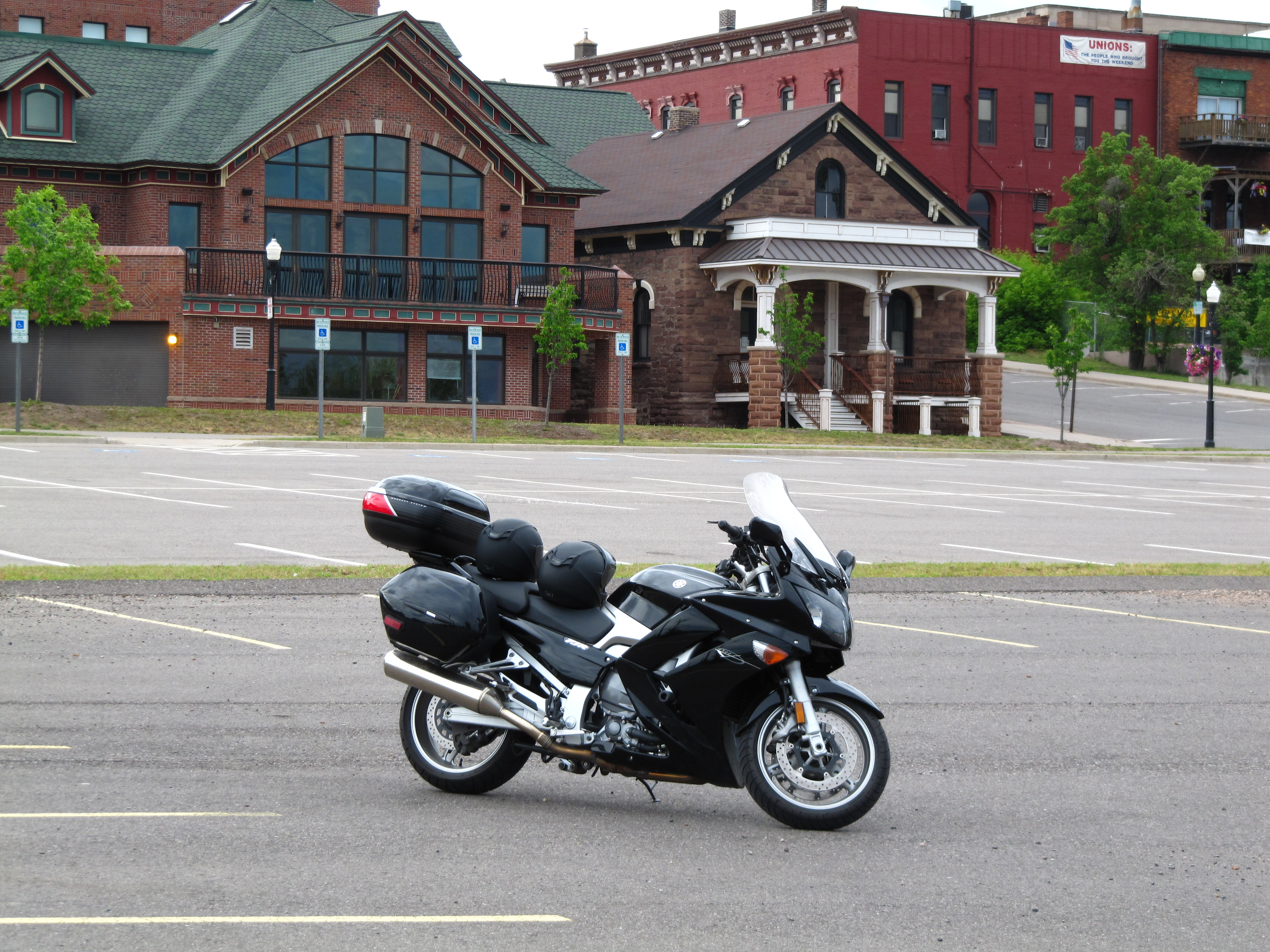
Yamaha FJR1300A

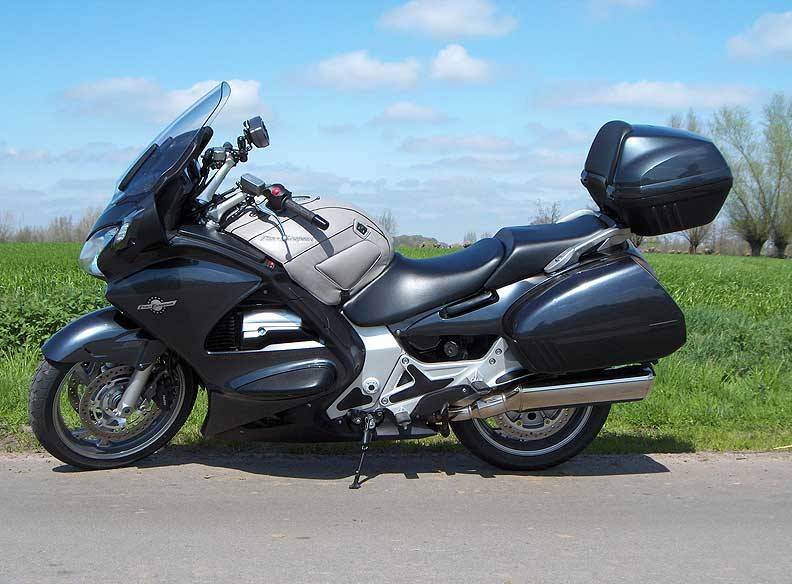
Honda ST1300

== See also ==
- Outline of motorcycles and motorcycling
