= Triumph Tiger 900 (T400) =

Triumph motorcycle manufactured 1993-1998

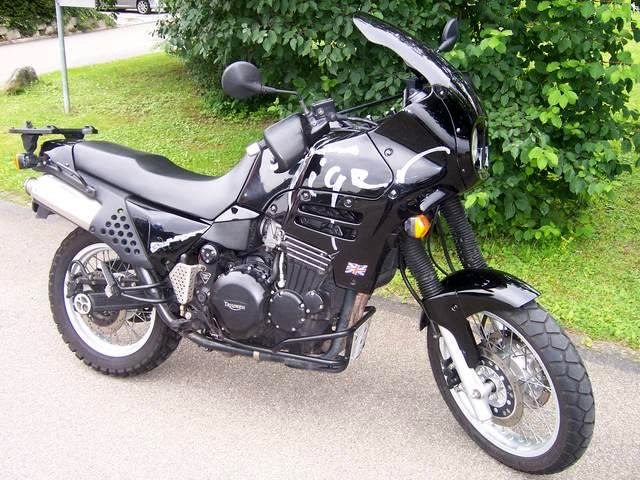
- Manufacturer: Triumph
- Also called: T400, Steamer
- Production: 1993–1998
- Successor: Tiger T709
- Class: Dual-sport
- Engine: 885 cc, 4-stroke inline 3-cylinder, Liquid-cooled, Bore/Stroke: 76 mm × 65 mm (3.0 in × 2.6 in); Compression Ratio: 10,6 : 1
- Power: 61 kW (82 hp) @ 8000 rpm
- Torque: 82 N⋅m (60 lbf⋅ft) @ 6000 rpm
- Transmission: Chain, 6-Speed Gearbox
- Suspension: Front: 43 mm, Rear: Monoshock with adjustable preload and rebound damping
- Brakes: Front: dual 276 mm discs Rear: single 255 mm disc
- Tyres: Front: 110/80 19, Rear: 140/80 17
- Wheelbase: 1,560 mm (61 in)
- Dimensions: L: 2,175 mm (85.6 in); W: 860 mm (34 in); H: 1,345 mm (53.0 in)
- Seat height: 850 mm (33 in)
- Weight: 209 kg (461 lb) (dry)
- Fuel capacity: 25 litres (5.5 imp gal; 6.6 US gal)

The original Tiger 900, manufactured by Triumph Motorcycles Ltd was introduced in 1993 and remained in production with minor improvements until 1998. Known to its fans as the 'Steamer', a nickname identifying it as a Hinckley Tiger, not a Meriden Tiger, and also distinguishing it as a carburettor, not fuel injected engine, this 885 cc dual sport motorcycle sold in comparatively small numbers in its native UK, but with some relative success in the US and continental Europe, particularly Germany.

Other notable characteristics of the 'steamer' include the strong 885 cc three cylinder engine and the seat height, both of which conspire to give a dominant riding position with the ability to see over other traffic.

It was replaced in 1999 by a heavily revised model known as the T709 – using a fuel injected version of the 885 cc engine - which albeit a more road oriented bike, sold well. In 2001 the T709 model was replaced with the model T709EN, 955 cc engine and fuel injected, commonly known as the Triumph Tiger 955i.

== Tiger models overview ==
Year	Model type	General
1993–1998	T400	885 cc
1999–2000	T709	885 cc, fuel injected
2001–2006	T709EN (955i)	955 cc, fuel injected
2007-2020	1050	1,050 cc, fuel injected

== See also ==
- List of Triumph motorcycles
- Triumph Tiger 955i
- Triumph Tiger 900 (2020)
