= Straight-three engine =

Type of engine

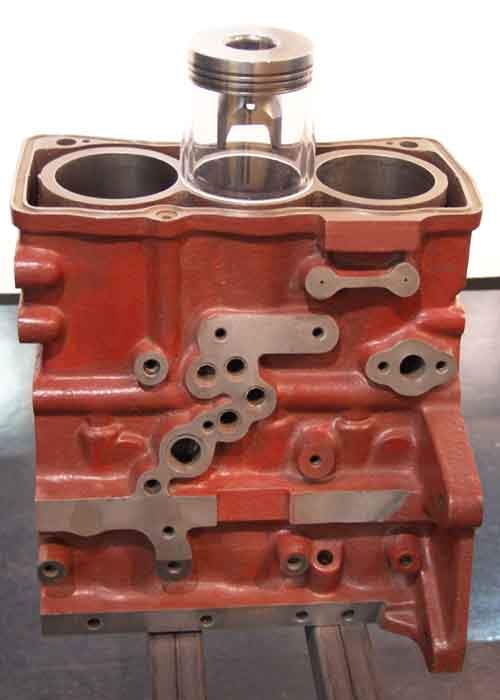
Engine block of an Elsbett straight-three diesel engine

A straight-three engine (also called an inline-triple or inline-three) is a three-cylinder piston engine where cylinders are arranged in a line along a common crankshaft.

Historically less common than straight-four engines, straight-three engines have been used in small and mid-sized vehicles, motorcycles, and agricultural machinery. Their use has increased since the 2020s as part of a broader industry trend toward smaller, turbocharged engines to meet fuel economy and emissions requirements. By the mid-2020s, they accounted for a small but growing share of new vehicles, after being rare prior to 2020.

Compared to straight-four engines, straight-three engines are typically lighter and have fewer moving parts, which can improve efficiency, but have limitations in performance and are prone to vibration, which have largely been overcome by advances in engine and vehicle design.

== Design ==
Four-stroke straight-three engine with firing order 1-3-2

Compared with straight-four engines, which always have a cylinder on its power stroke, straight-three engines have intervals in which no cylinder is on its power stroke. As a result, individual combustion events must be stronger to achieve comparable output.

A 120-degree crankshaft is typically used in straight-three engines, producing evenly spaced firing intervals. This configuration provides perfect primary and secondary balance in the reciprocating-plane, but primary and secondary rotating-plane imbalances are present. This manifests as an end-to-end rocking couple due to asymmetry in piston motion about the center cylinder, resulting in pronounced low-frequency vibrations that can be difficult to isolate. These can be mitigated through measures such as balance shafts and engine mounts designed to limit their transmission to the vehicle structure.

Other crankshaft configurations have also been used. The 1976–1981 Laverda Jota motorcycle used a 180-degree crankshaft, in which the outer pistons move together while the inner piston is offset by 180 degrees, resulting in evenly spaced power strokes followed by a longer interval without one. The 2020 Triumph Tiger 900 uses a "T-plane" crankshaft with throws at 90-degree intervals, with cylinders 1 and 3 separated by 180 degrees.

Straight-three engines can offer improved fuel efficiency due to their smaller size, lower mass, and reduced internal friction from having fewer moving parts. For a given displacement, each cylinder is also larger than in a straight-four engine, allowing larger valves and improved airflow.

== Usage in cars ==
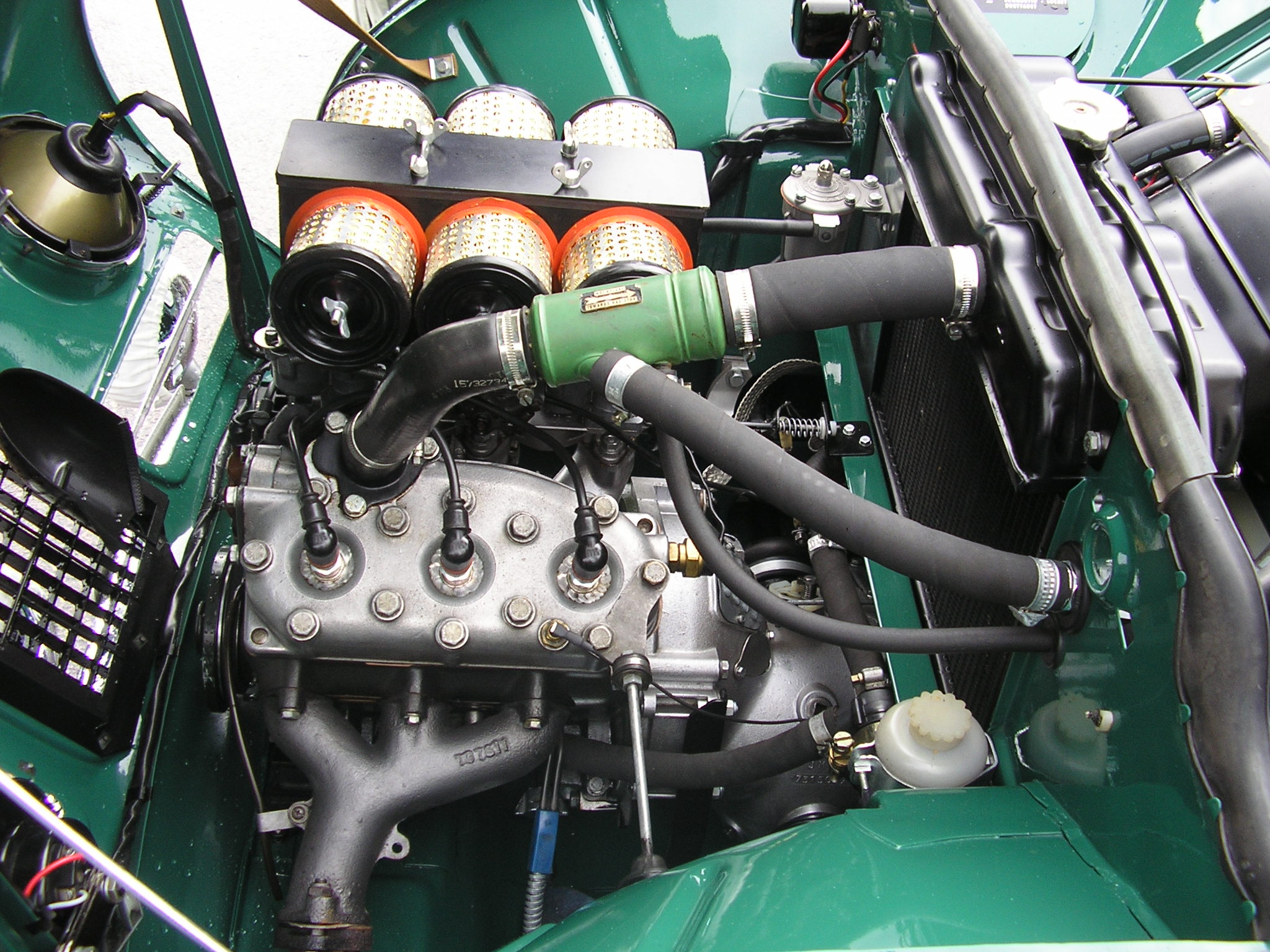
Circa-1960 Saab two-stroke engine

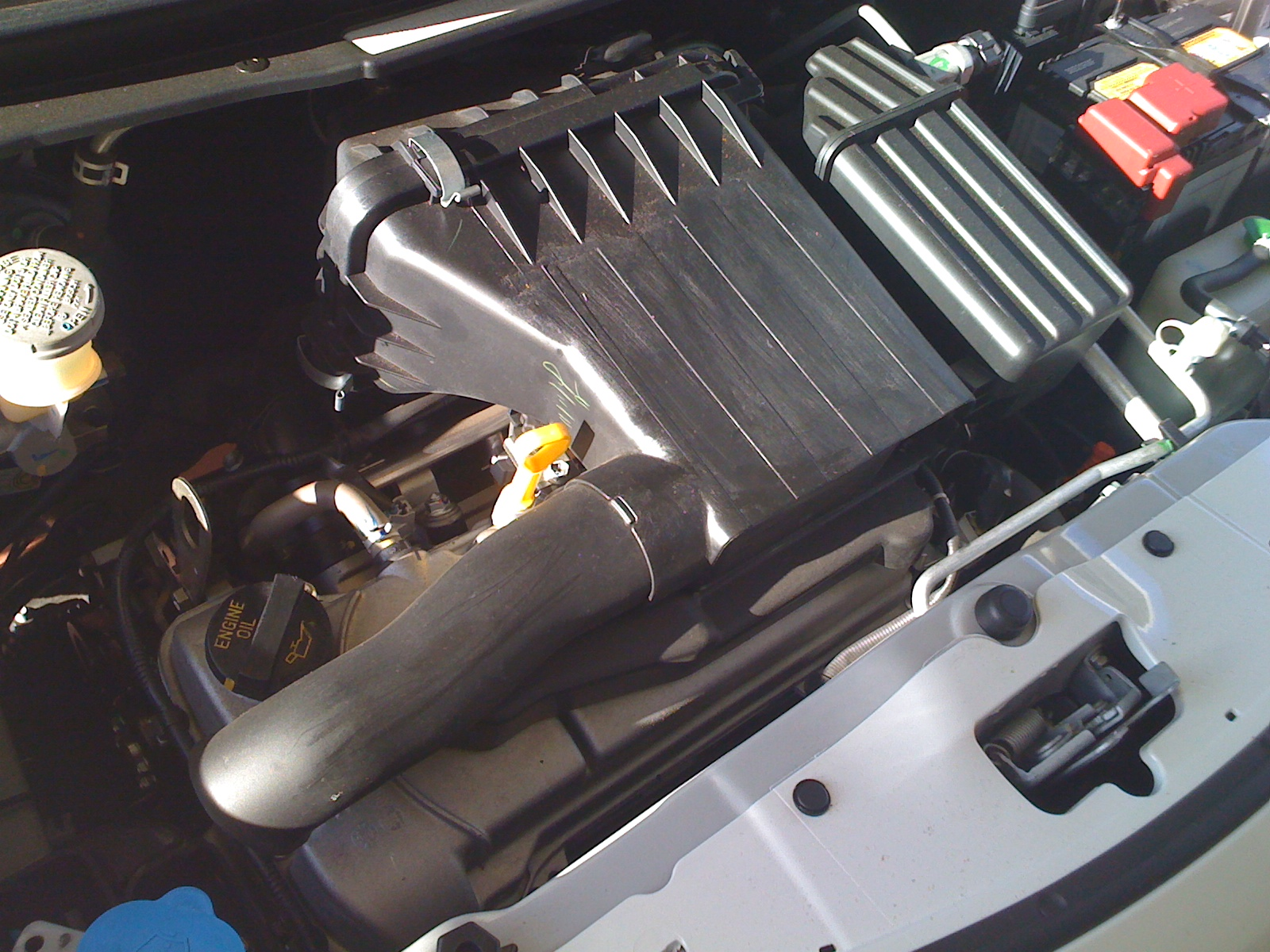
2010 Suzuki K10B engine

One of the first 3 cylinder cars include the 3 cylinder 15hp Rolls Royce produced in 1905 . The first 3-cylinder two-stroke engine was the one used in the German DKW F9 of 1938, which remained in production in Germany (on both sides of the Iron Curtain) for over 30 years. In the West, it powered the DKW Sonderklasse, DKW Junior, Auto Union 1000, and DKW F102 until 1965, while in the GDR, the IFA F9 evolved into the Wartburg, which continued to use this engine until 1988. In the 1950s, the complete DKW powertrain was copied by Saab (for the 93, 95, 96, and 97 models) and Polish FSO (for the Syrena).

The 1967 Suzuki Fronte 360 uses a 256 cc (16 cu in) two-stroke engine. In 1980, Suzuki began production of a 543 cc (33 cu in) four-stroke engine, which was introduced in the Alto and Fronte models.

The Subaru EF engine is a 4-stroke petrol engine which was introduced in 1984 and used in the Justy and the Sumo (the export version of the Sambar).

The straight-three versions of the Ford EcoBoost engine – a turbocharged 1.0-litre petrol engine – was introduced in the 2012 Ford Focus. It uses an unbalanced flywheel to shift the inherent three-cylinder imbalance to the horizontal plane where it is more easily managed by engine mounts, and so remove the need to use balance shafts. In 2016, cylinder deactivation was added, claimed to be a world first for three-cylinder engines.

Historically, straight-three engines have been less popular than straight-four engines in small and mid-sized vehicles. However, their use increased in the 2020s as part of a broader industry trend toward smaller, turbocharged engines to meet fuel economy and emissions requirements. In the United States, three-cylinder engines grew from less than 1% of new vehicles before 2020 to about 5% by the 2025 model year, roughly matching the share of eight-cylinder gasoline engines, while four-cylinder engines remained dominant at 60% of the market in 2025.

Notable straight-three engines
Years	Name	Fuel	Notes	Ref.
1977–1993	Daihatsu C-series	Petrol		
1983–2001	Suzuki G10	Petrol		
1986–1995	VM Motori R series	Diesel	Turbocharged	
1987–present	Mitsubishi 3G8	Petrol		
1988–present	Honda E0 series	Petrol	Some versions turbocharged	
1991–2008	Daewoo S-TEC	Petrol		
1996–2002	GM X10XE	Petrol		
1998–2007	Mercedes-Benz M160	Petrol	Turbocharged	
1998–2005	Volkswagen R3 PD TDI 3L	Diesel	Turbocharged	
1999–2014	Mercedes-Benz OM660	Diesel	Turbocharged	
1999–2005	VM Motori R 315	Diesel	Turbocharged	
2000–2006	Honda ECA1	Petrol	Mated to IMA hybrid system	
2003–present	Honda P series	Petrol	Some versions turbocharged	
2003–present	Mitsubishi 3A9	Petrol		
2004–2011	Hyundai U engine	Diesel	Turbocharged	
2004–present	Volkswagen R3 (EA111)	Petrol		
2004–2009	Mercedes-Benz OM639	Diesel	Turbocharged	
2004–present	Toyota 1KR-FE	Petrol		
2010–present	Nissan HR	Petrol	Some versions supercharged	
2011–2017	Fiat XSDE	Diesel		
2012–present	BMW B37	Diesel	Turbocharged	
2012–present	Ford EcoBoost	Petrol	Some versions turbocharged	
2012–present	Honda S series	Petrol	Some versions turbocharged	
2012–present	Renault TCe	Petrol	Some versions turbocharged	
2013–present	BMW B38	Petrol	Turbocharged	
2013–present	GM small gasoline engine	Petrol	Turbocharged	
2014–present	PSA Group PureTech	Petrol	Some versions turbocharged	
2016–present	Fiat Global Small Engine	Petrol	Some versions turbocharged	
2018–present	GM E-Turbo	Petrol	Turbocharged	
2018–present	Ingenium AJ150	Petrol	Turbocharged	
2020–present	Toyota G16E	Petrol	Turbocharged	
2020–present	Koenigsegg TFG	Petrol	Turbocharged	

== Usage in motorcycles ==
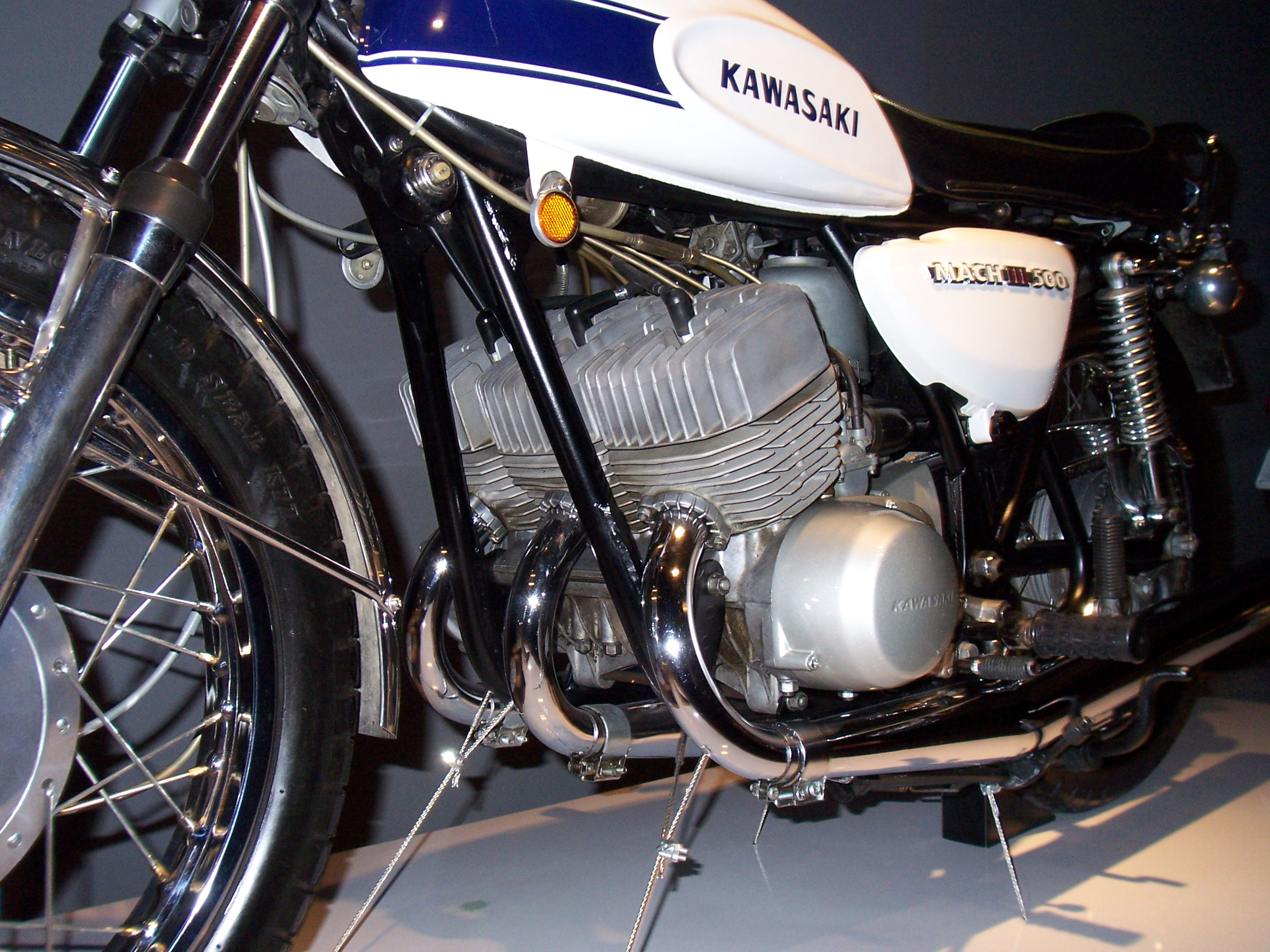
1969–1975 Kawasaki H1 Mach III

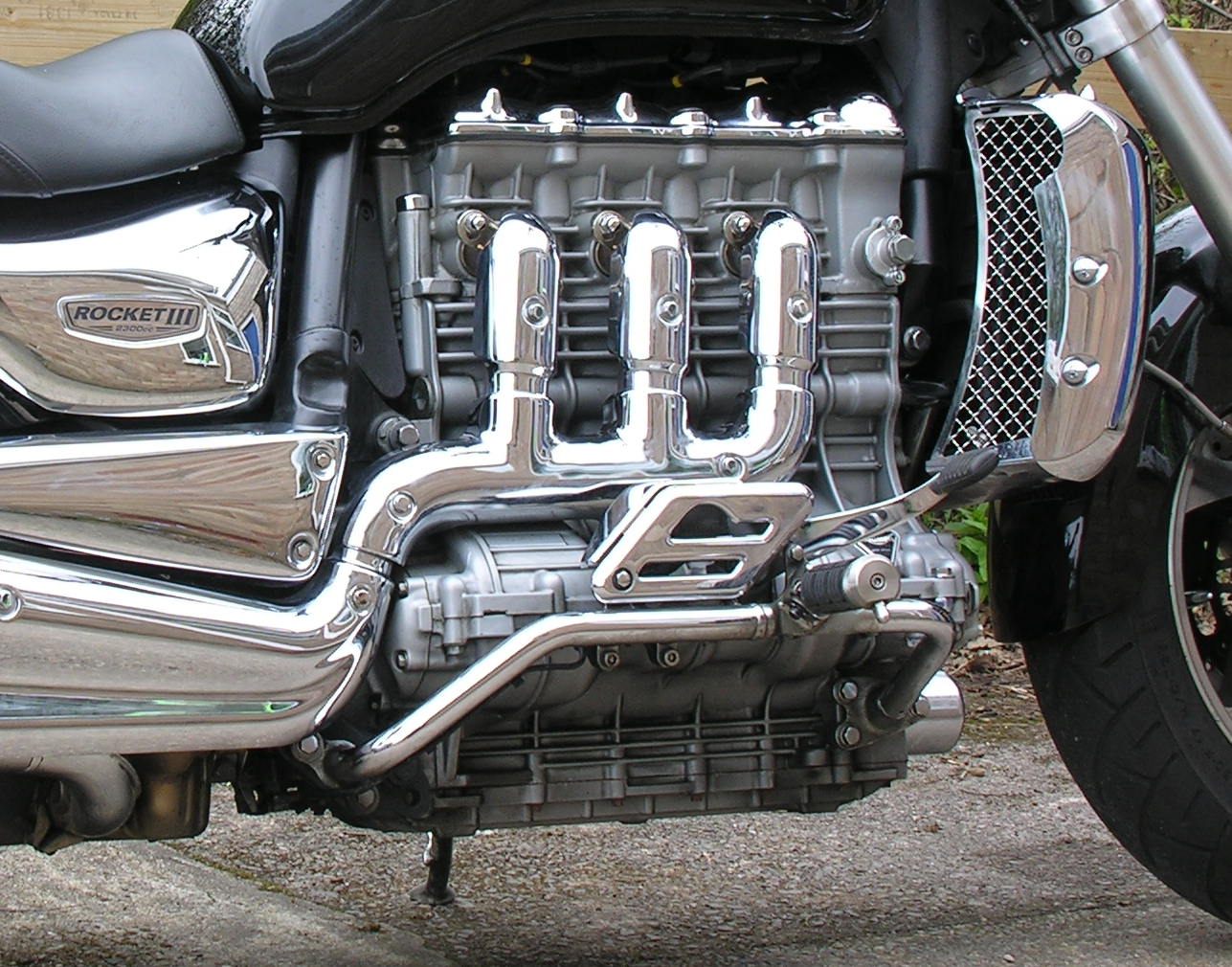
2004–present Triumph Rocket III engine

The advantages of a straight-three engine for motorcycles are that it has a shorter length than an inline-four engine and produces less vibration than a straight-twin engine.

=== Four-stroke ===
Four-stroke straight-three engines have been used in road bikes and racing bikes by several companies.

From 1985–1995, the BMW K75 was produced with a straight-three engine (based on the straight-four engine from the BMW K100).

British company Triumph is particularly renowned for a transversely-mounted straight-three engine. Variants have been used in their Speed Triple, Trident, Sprint, and Tiger series. In addition Triumph makes the Rocket III model, various variants of which have held the record for motorcycle with the largest engine displacement.

In 2019, the Moto2 class in the MotoGP World Championship switched to using Triumph 765 cc (46.7 cu in) triple engines.

=== Two-stroke ===
Two-stroke designs are less common in straight-three engines than four-stroke designs, however several were produced by Japanese manufacturers in the late 1960s through to 1980s.

The Kawasaki triple engine was produced from 1968 to 1980 and was used in various road bikes and racing bikes. Most versions were air-cooled, however several were water-cooled. Similarly, the 1972–1980 Suzuki GT series engines were used for both road bike and racing bikes, and were available in both air-cooled and water-cooled versions.

== Other uses ==
=== Agriculture ===
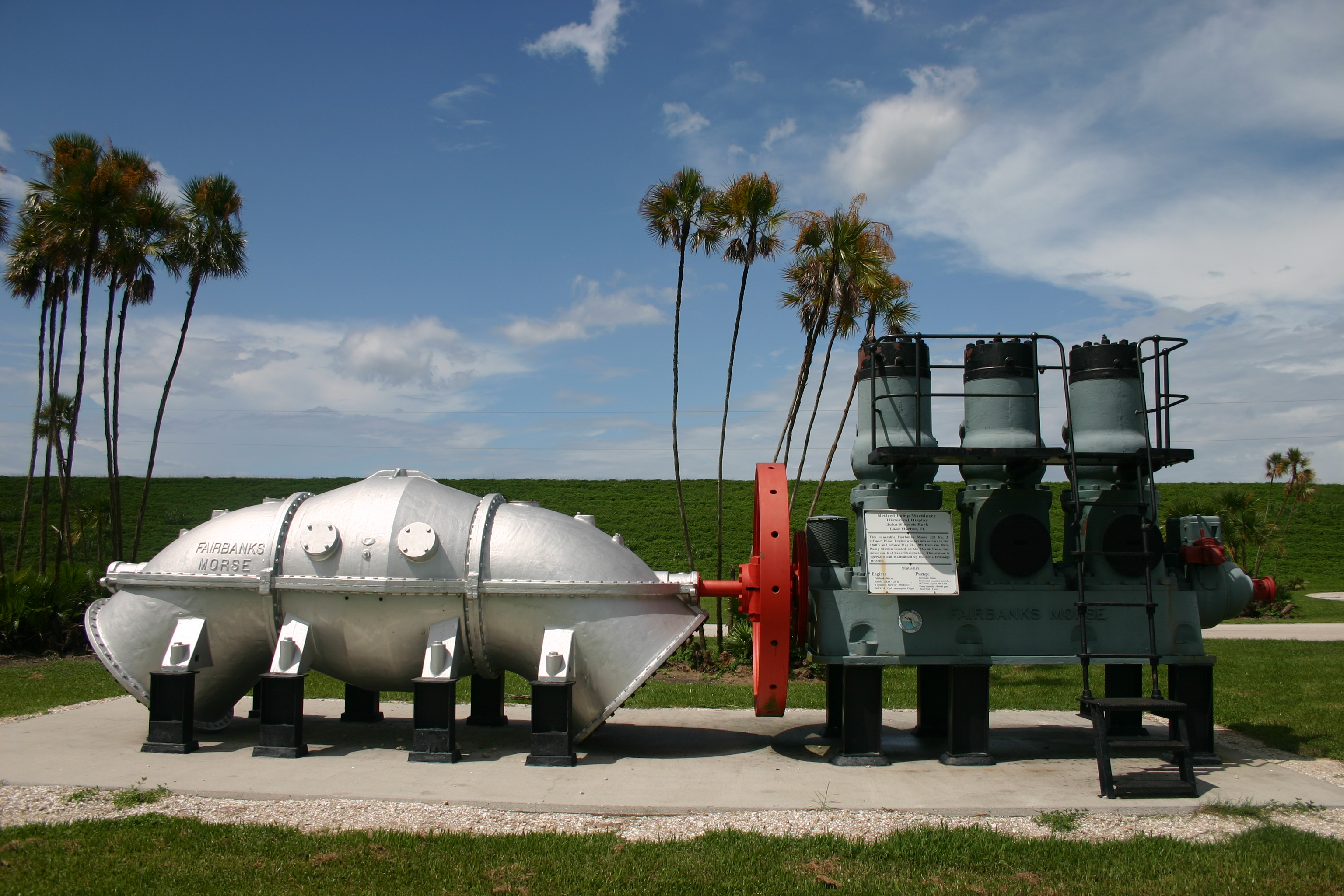
1940s Fairbanks-Morse straight-three diesel engine

An example of an agricultural application is the Fairbanks-Morse 32E14 low-speed diesel engine.

The straight-three layout is common for diesel tractor engines, such as the Perkins AD3.152. This engine was used in the Massey Ferguson 35 and Fordson Dextra tractors, as well as for marine and stationary applications.

=== Aviation ===
The Hewland AE75 is a 750 cc two-stroke aircraft engine that was produced in the mid-1980s. It was an inverted three-cylinder design with liquid-cooling that produced 75 bhp (56 kW).

== See also ==
- Straight engine
- V3 engine
