= Les Harris =

Les Harris may refer to:

- Les Harris (businessman) (1939–2009), UK motorcycle industry businessman
- Les Harris (producer), Canadian television and film producer
- Les Harris (footballer) (born 1955), English footballer

== See also ==
- Leslie Harris (disambiguation)
