= Triumph Bonneville =

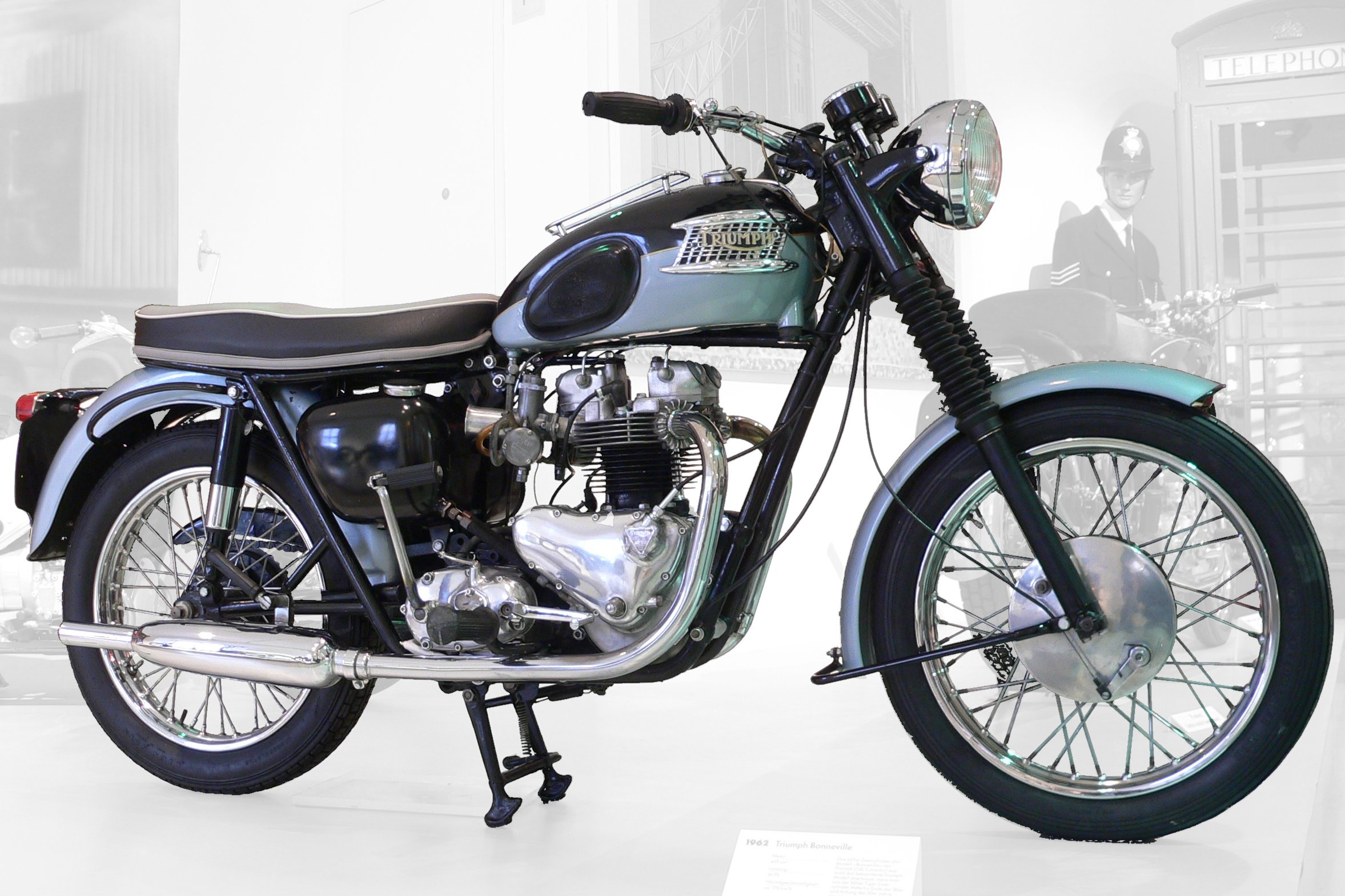
- A Triumph Bonneville T120 with pre-unit engine on display at the Deutsches Zweirad- und NSU-Museum
- Manufacturer: Triumph Engineering; Triumph Motorcycles Ltd
- Also called: 'Bonnie'
- Production: 1959–1983, 1985–1988, 2001–
- Predecessor: TR6 Trophy
- Engine: Four-stroke parallel twin
- Transmission: 4-speed (later 5-speed & 6-speed)

The Triumph Bonneville is a standard motorcycle featuring a parallel-twin four-stroke engine and manufactured in three generations over three separate production runs.

The first two generations, by the defunct Triumph Engineering in Meriden, West Midlands, England, were 1959–1983 and 1985–1988.

The third series, by Triumph Motorcycles in Hinckley, Leicestershire, began in 2001 and continues to the present as a completely new design that strongly resembles the original series.

The name Bonneville derives from the famous Bonneville Salt Flats, Utah, USA, where Triumph and others attempted to break the motorcycle speed records.

== Development history ==
=== T120 Bonneville ===
The original Triumph Bonneville was a 650 cc parallel-twin motorcycle manufactured by Triumph Engineering and later by Norton Villiers Triumph between 1959 and 1974. It was based on the company's Triumph Tiger T110 and was fitted with the Tiger's optional twin 1 3/16 in Amal monobloc carburettors as standard, along with that model's high-performance inlet camshaft. Initially it was produced with a pre-unit construction engine which enabled the bike to achieve 115 mph without further modification, but later in 1963 a unit construction model was introduced which was stiffer and more compact, including additional bracing at the steering head and swing arm. The steering angle was altered and improved forks were fitted a couple of years later, which, together with the increased stiffness enabled overall performance to match that of the Bonneville's rivals. Later T120 Bonnevilles used a new frame which contained the engine oil instead of using a separate tank; this became known as the oil in frame version. The T120 engine, both in standard configuration and especially when tuned for increased performance, was popular in café racers such as Tribsas (BSA frame) and particularly Tritons (Norton featherbed frame).

=== T140 Bonneville ===
The 650 cc T120 Bonneville, was joined in 1973 by the T140 Bonneville, the same basic machine but with a 750 cc engine. Designated T140V, the new Bonneville featured a larger-capacity engine of 724 cc, a five-speed gearbox and a single disc front brake. Shortly after, the engine was further bored out to 744 cc. After a factory lock-in by the Meriden workers for over a year kept Triumph twin cylinder models off the market place, only the larger Bonneville returned afterwards in 1975. By then, the gearchange foot lever had been moved from right to left to comply with new regulations mandated for the American market and a rear disc brake fitted. Several T140 models followed featuring various styling and engineering modifications and refinements including electronic ignition from 1979 and electric starting from 1980 until production ceased with the closure of the Meriden works in 1983.

Although this should have been the end of the Bonneville, as it turned out it was not. Triumph Motorcycles was acquired by businessman John Bloor, who licensed a company called Racing Spares in Devon, run by Les Harris to manufacture the T140 Bonneville. These continuation bikes known as 'Devon' or 'Harris' Bonnevilles did not reach the market until 1985 and were not sold in the U.S. market. Production of these ended in 1988.

== New Bonneville (800, 900 & 1200) ==
Bloor's Triumph Motorcycles Ltd launched a completely new model, the Bonneville 800 (790cc), in September 2001. Originally built exclusively in Hinckley, England, some models are now (2014) produced at the company's Thailand manufacturing facility, which also makes components and accessories for various Triumph motorbikes. The new Bonneville strongly resembles the earlier models in style and basic configuration, but with modern engineering. At the debut the new version was given a 790 cc parallel-twin engine, with the up-spec T100 receiving an 865 cc engine from 2005. From 2007 on, all Bonnevilles received the 865 cc engine. Through 2007, all engines had carburettors; electronic fuel injection (EFI) was then introduced to the 2008 models in Britain and to United States models in the 2009 model year, in both cases to comply with increasingly stringent emissions requirements. Dummy carburettors, which are actually redesigned throttle bodies made to resemble carburettors, have been added to the 2009 models to retain the original vintage styling of previous years. For 2016, Triumph introduced an all new T120 1200cc 270° liquid-cooled, SOHC, version of the Bonneville, then in 2017 a T100 900cc version.

From 2008, all Bonnevilles received a slightly larger and reshaped tank to accommodate the EFI pump, but the tank capacity was not altered. Even though US 2008 models were not injected they still received the larger tank, therefore the space for the pump was not used.

All the bikes in Triumph's current "Modern Classics" line are derived from the new Bonneville, including the SE (with a smaller front wheel to be marketed to riders who may have found the 19' wheel too tall), T100, Thruxton, Scrambler, America, and Speedmaster.

In 2006, Triumph launched the "Sixty-8" line of Bonneville accessories, offering vintage and modern-style items including seats, seat covers, cam covers, sprocket covers, petrol tank covers, tank badges, panniers, and other items to allow Bonneville owners the opportunity to customise their bikes for considerably less cost than traditional customisations. The adoption of the EFI engine in 2008 rendered many of these accessories obsolete, since tank covers, tank badges etc. would not fit the redesigned tank.

The original T120 Bonneville was a speed-orientated motorcycle, but the new Bonnevilles are softer and aimed at the roadster market. In particular, the 865cc Bonneville competes directly with the Harley-Davidson 883, with MotorCycle News declaring that "Triumph Bonneville is unquestionably the better motorcycle. The handling is more than respectable, the brakes markedly better and, of course, it's British."

== Models ==
Many different versions of the original Bonneville were produced; suffix letters were given to denote the exact model. Listed below in chronological order are the main types and their features:

=== T120 Bonneville ===
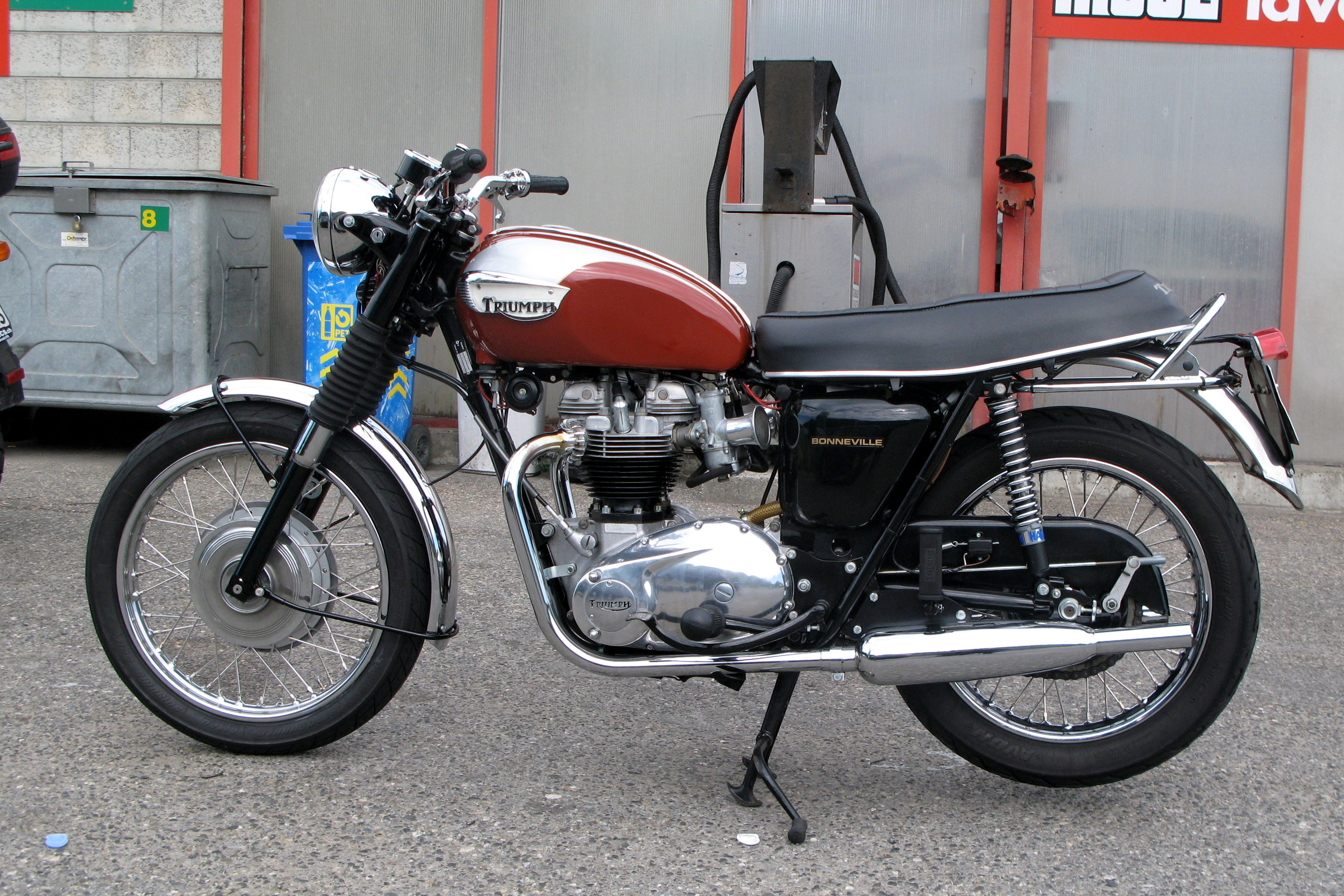
1970 US specification Triumph Bonneville T120R with 650cc Unit construction engine

- T120: Home and general export model.
- T120R: Export model for the United States of America.
- T120C: Export competition model with high-level exhaust pipes.
- T120TT: 1964 export dirt track racing model of the T120C for the U.S. East Coast. 'Thruxton' models were factory homologated road racing models, to special order.
- T120RV: Five-speed gearbox.
- T120V: Five-speed gearbox with front disk brake.

=== T140 Bonneville ===
- T140V: The initial model of the T140. The 'V' indicated a five-speed gearbox. Produced between 1972 and 1978.
- T140RV: Export version of T140V.
- T140J: Limited edition of 1,000 each (plus 400 for Commonwealth export) of the T140V in USA and UK specification, produced to commemorate the 1977 Silver Jubilee of Elizabeth II.

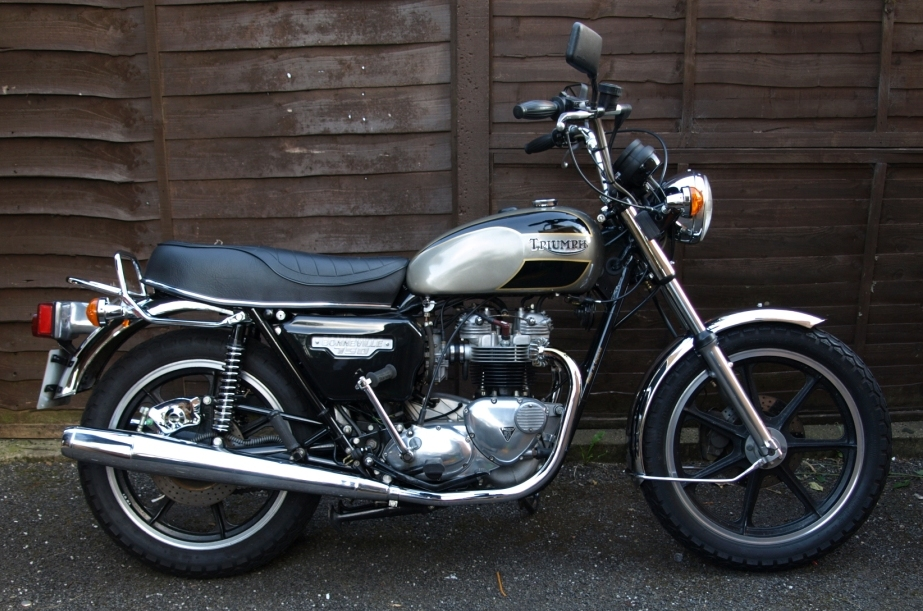
1980 T140E Bonneville

- T140E: The letter 'E' stood for emissions, enabling export to the USA market. This model featured redesigned Amal carburetors soon joined by Lucas electronic ignition to further assist meet emission regulations.
- T140D: Limited edition. T140D offered with Lester, later Morris, cast wheels in black/gold scheme only. The US version had a special siamesed exhaust system unique to this model. The 'D' stood for Daytona Beach, USA, where the model was conceived.
- T140ES: Electric start or 'Electro' Bonneville.
- T140AV: Anti-vibration engine mountings.
- T140LE: Limited Edition. 250 'Royal' Bonnevilles were built to commemorate the 1981 marriage of Lady Diana Spencer and Prince Charles.
- T140W TSS: The Triumph T140W TSS. Introduced 1982. Eight-valve cylinder head and revised crankshaft to reduce vibration. The TSS stood for 'Triumph Super Sports'. The 'W' stood for Weslake whose cylinder head design Triumph adapted.
- T140TSX: A custom-styled T140, the Triumph T140 TSX featured Morris cast wheels, the rear being 16-inch diameter, stepped seat and special finish.
- Harris T140: Built under license 1985 to 1988 by Les Harris after the Meriden factory closed and featuring significantly more Italian and German component parts.

=== New Bonneville ===
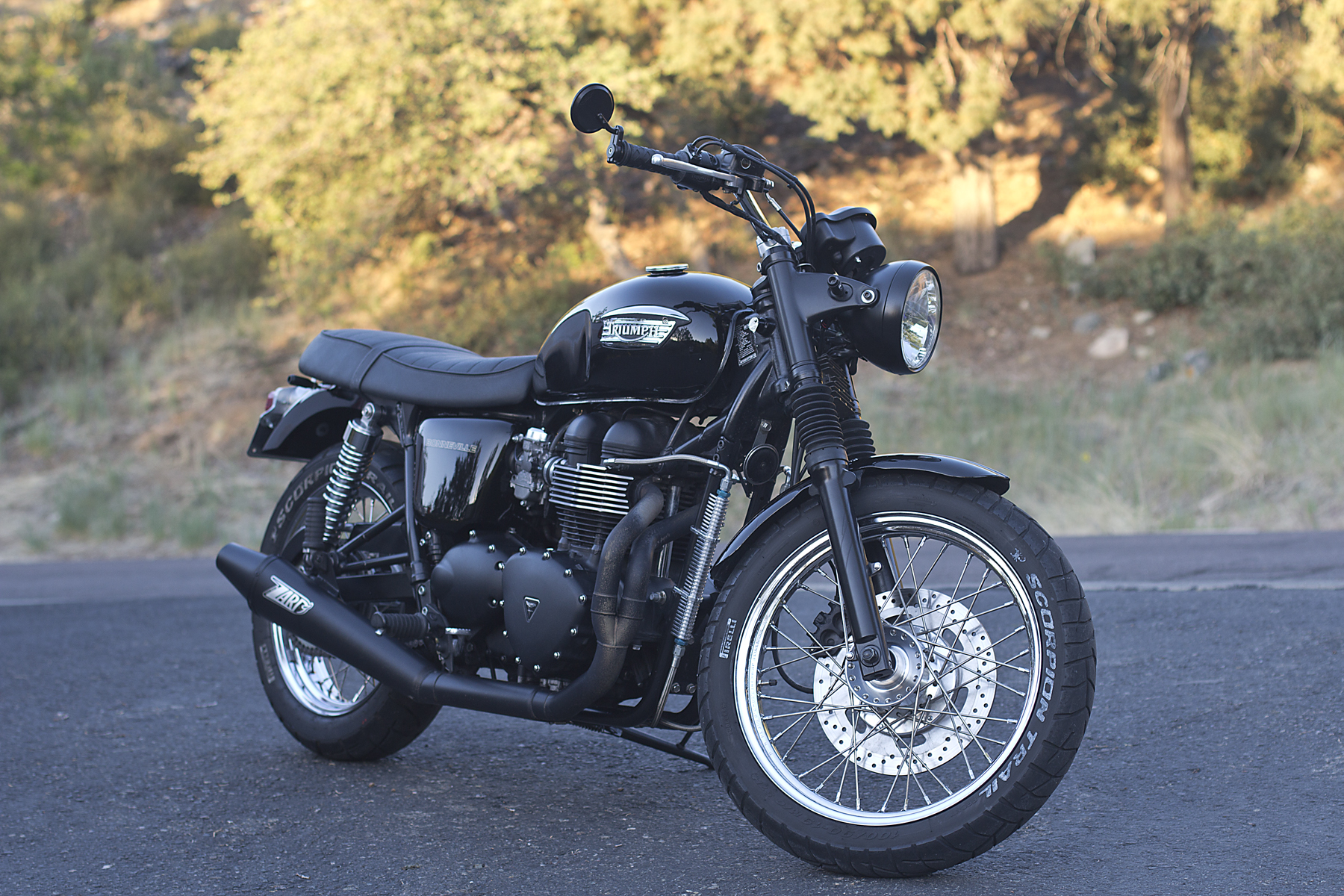
A customized 2007 Triumph Bonneville Black model

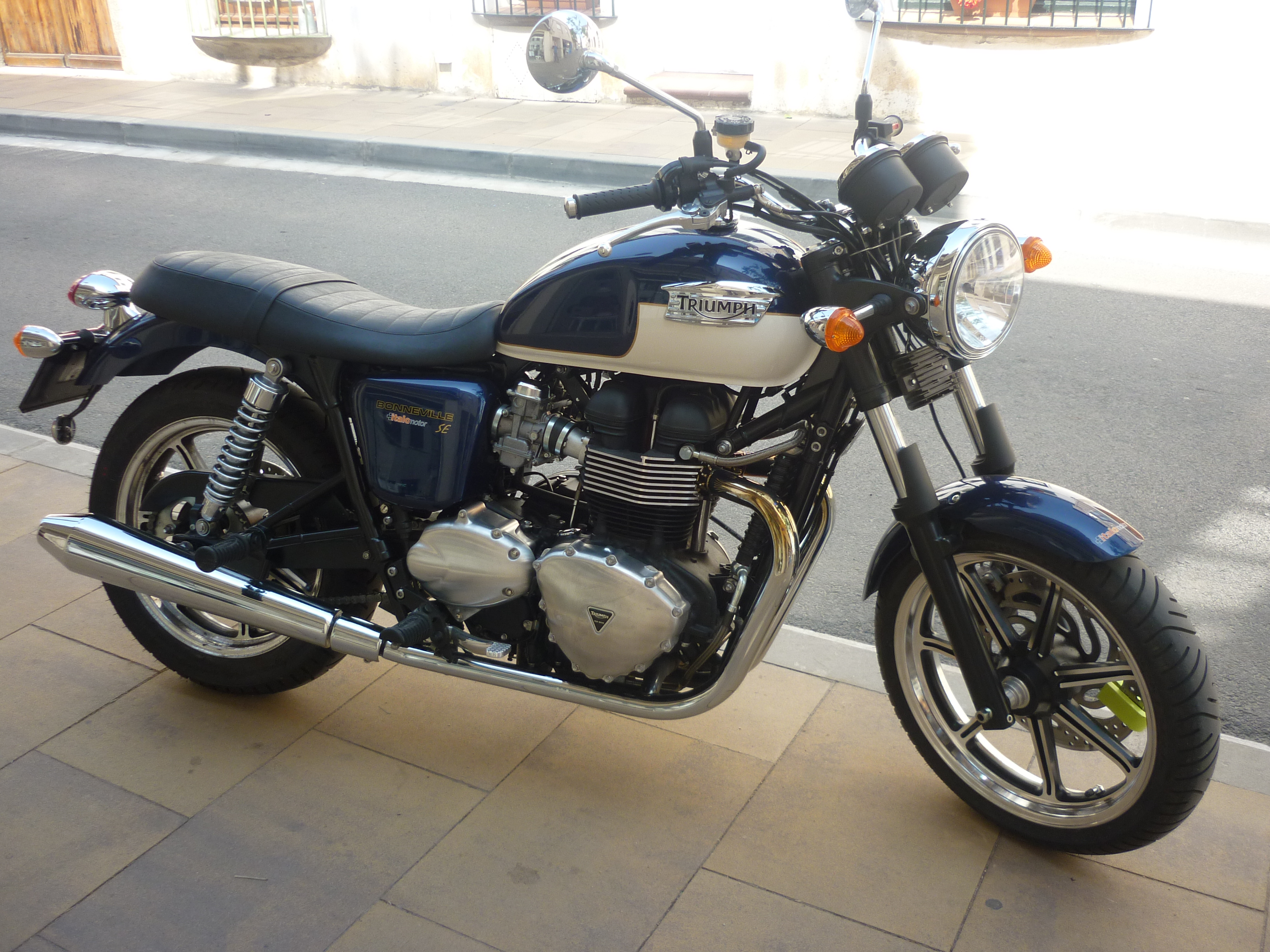
2009 Triumph Bonneville SE with cast alloy wheels

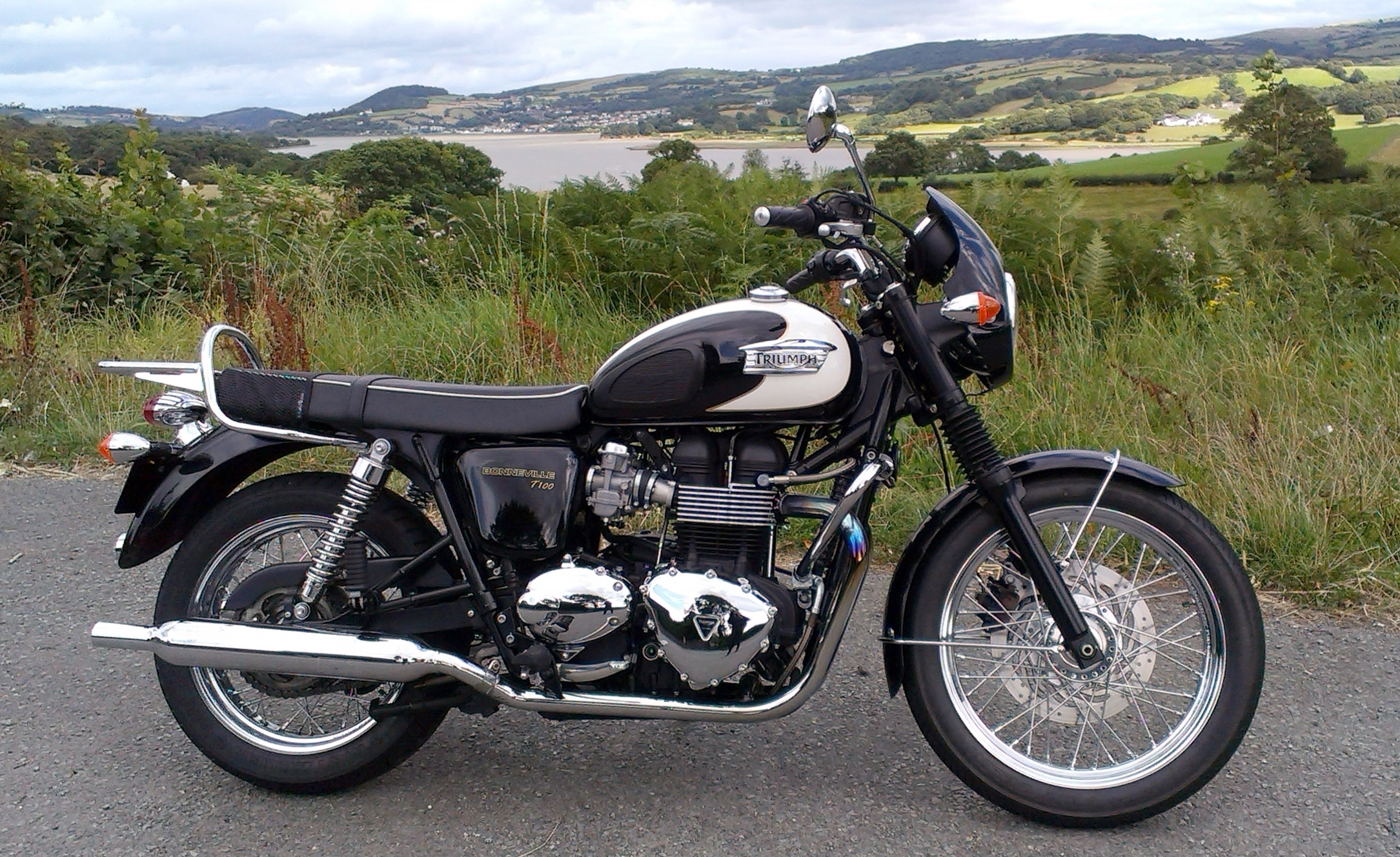
2011 Triumph Bonneville T100

- Bonneville 790: Introduced 2000. Original 790 cc model
- Bonneville: Current (2014) baseline model. In 2009 the baseline model gained cast alloy wheels, tank badge in decal form, black engine covers and up-swept megaphone exhaust silencers
- Bonneville Black: 2004 to 2008. Variation on baseline model with black paint and introducing the black engine covers subsequently used across the family from 2004, except on the Speedmaster, SE and T100.

From 2008, all models received a bigger reshaped tank (see above).

- Bonneville SE: Introduced 2009. Uprated model still with black engine, cast alloy wheels and upswept megaphone exhaust silencers, but with traditional metal tank badge, polished alloy engine covers and 'shortie' mudguards. Available with two-tone colour scheme
- T100: Top-of-the-range model with spoked wire wheels, fork gaiters, two-tone tank colour scheme, twin 'peashooter' exhausts, chromed engine covers, Triumph logo on seat,
- Thruxton: Introduced 2004. Redesigned Bonneville with 60s café racer styling. First model with the larger 865 cc engine.
- Scrambler: Introduced 2006. Redesigned Bonneville with off-road styling of the T100C version of the Triumph Tiger 100, the TR6C, and the Triumph Trophy Trail (TR5T)
- America: Semi-cruiser styled model with lengthened wheelbase, lowered saddle. Primarily intended for the United States of America.
- Speedmaster: 'Factory custom' cruiser based on the Triumph Bonneville America

2016-2018 "Modern Classics" Line

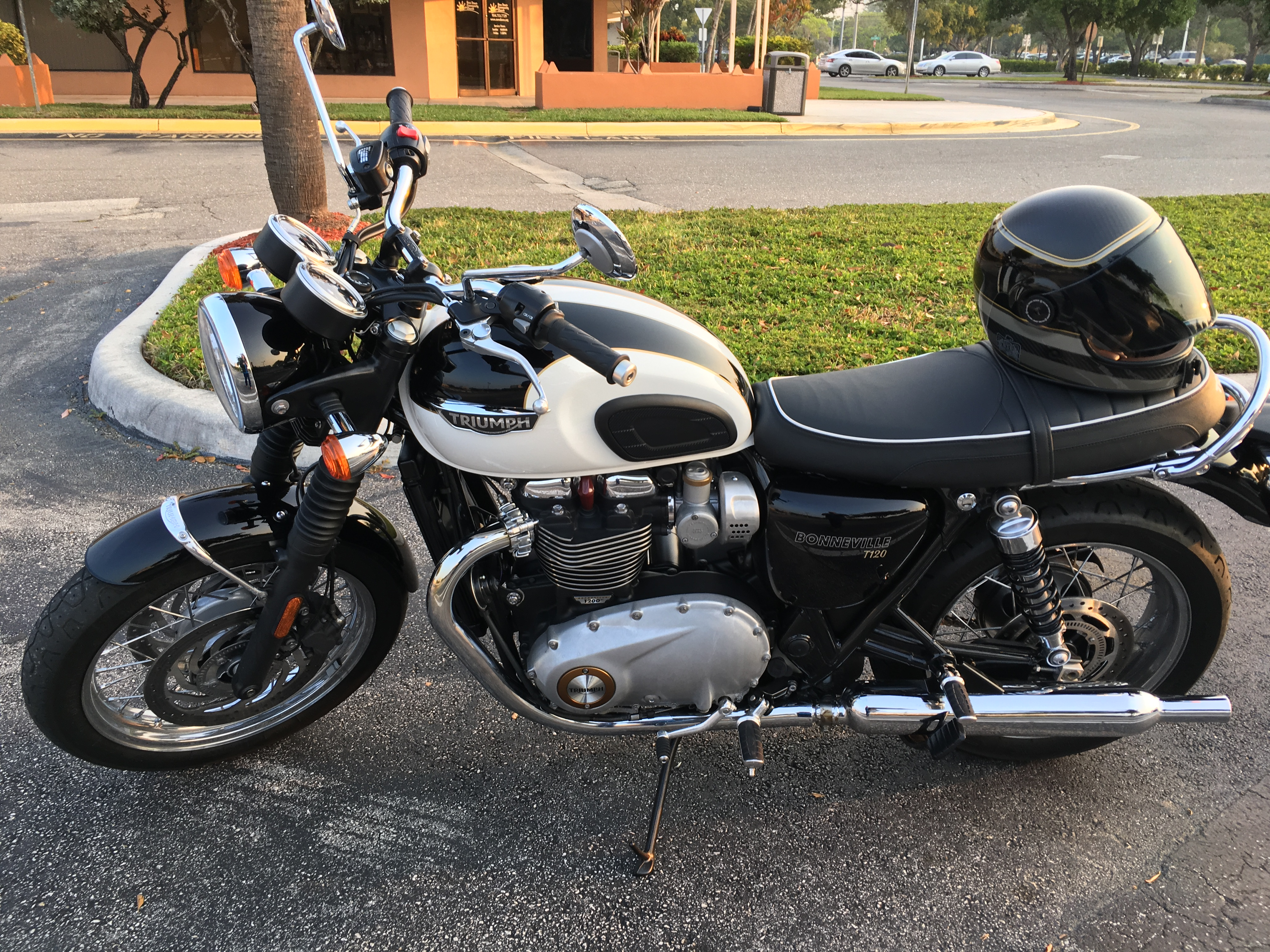
2017 Bonneville T120 1200 cc motorcycle

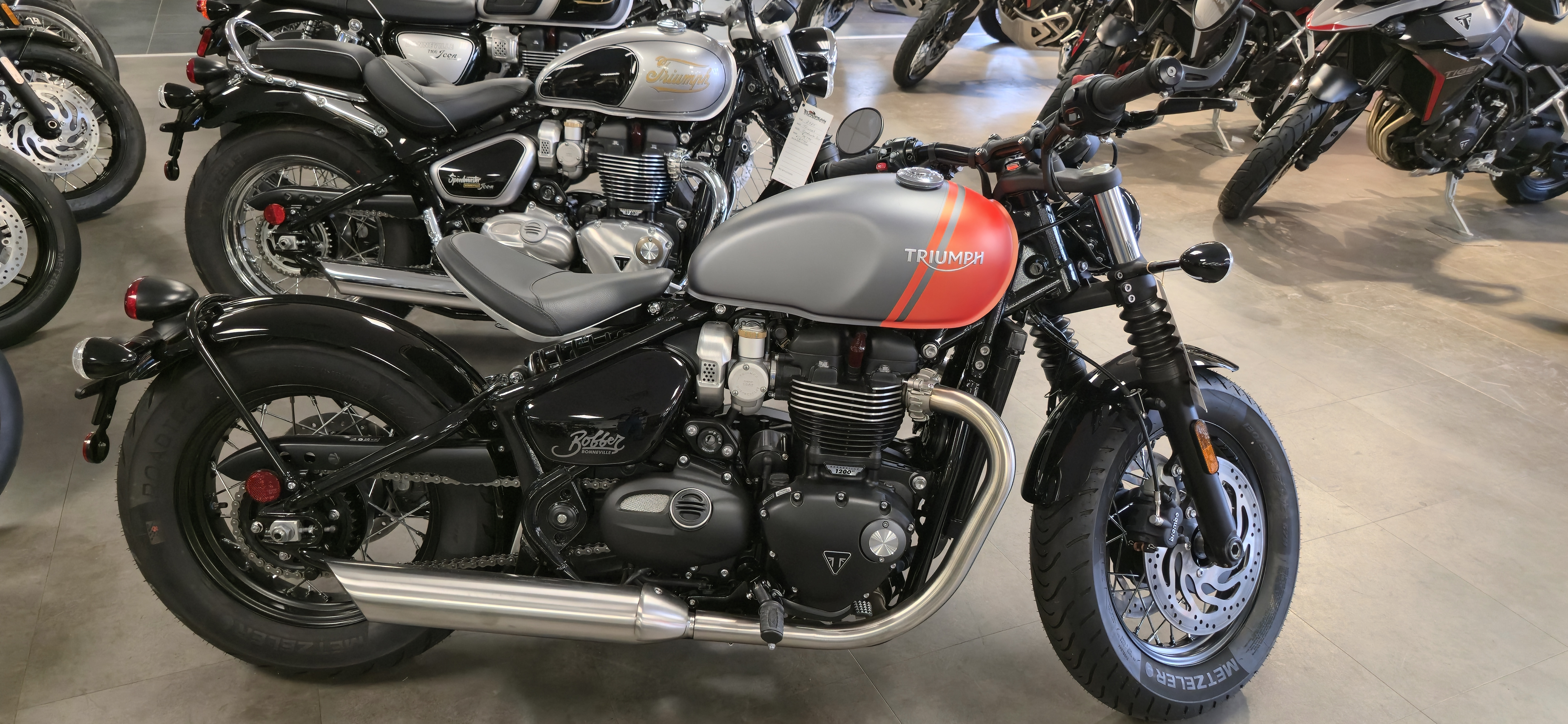
2025 Bonneville Bobber

- Bonneville T120 water cooled 1200 cc 2016–
- Bonneville T100 Water Cooled 900 cc 2017–
- Thruxton Water Cooled 1200 cc 2016
- Thruxton Air Cooled 865 cc 2016–
- Bobber 1200 cc: 2017–
- Scrambler 865 cc 2016–
- Street Twin 900 cc 2016–
- Street Cup 900 cc 2016–
- Street Scrambler 900 cc 2016–
- Speedmaster 2018–
- Speed Twin 2018–

== See also ==
- List of Triumph motorcycles
- BSA Rocket 3/Triumph Trident
- Triumph Triple - Hinckley
- List of motorcycles of the 1950s
