= Leslie Harris =

Leslie Harris may refer to:

- Leslie Harris (lawyer), president and chief executive officer of the Center for Democracy and Technology
- Leslie Harris (Welsh cricketer) (1915–1985), Welsh cricketer
- Leslie Harris (Barbadian cricketer) (1920-2007), Barbadian cricketer
- Leslie Harris (director) (born 1960), American film director, screenwriter and producer
- Leslie Harris (motorcyclist) (c. 1910–1961), English motorcycle racer
- Leslie Julius Harris (1898–1973), British biochemist and nutritionist
- Leslie M. Harris (born 1965), American historian and scholar
- Leslie Harris (businessman)
- Leslie Harris (footballer)

== See also ==
- Lesley Harris (netball), New Zealand netball player
- Les Harris (disambiguation)
