= T100 =

T100 or T-100 may refer to:

- T100, former train number of Shanghai-Kowloon Through Train
- T-100 tank, Soviet super-heavy tank prototype
- Toyota T100, a pickup truck, produced by Toyota between 1992 and 1998, for North American markets
- Triumph Bonneville T100, a motorcycle
- Leonardo DRS T-100 Integrated Training System, an advanced trainer based on the Alenia Aermacchi M-346 Master
- T100 Triathlon

== See also ==
- T1000 (disambiguation)
