= White Helmets =

White Helmets may refer to:

- White Helmets Commission, a body of the Argentine Ministry of Foreign Affairs, International Trade and Worship
- White Helmets (Syrian Civil War), a volunteer organization in Syria and Turkey
  - The White Helmets (film), a 2016 documentary film
- Royal Signals Motorcycle Display Team, UK motorcycle team also known as the White Helmets
