= Triumph Bonneville T100 =

British motorcycle

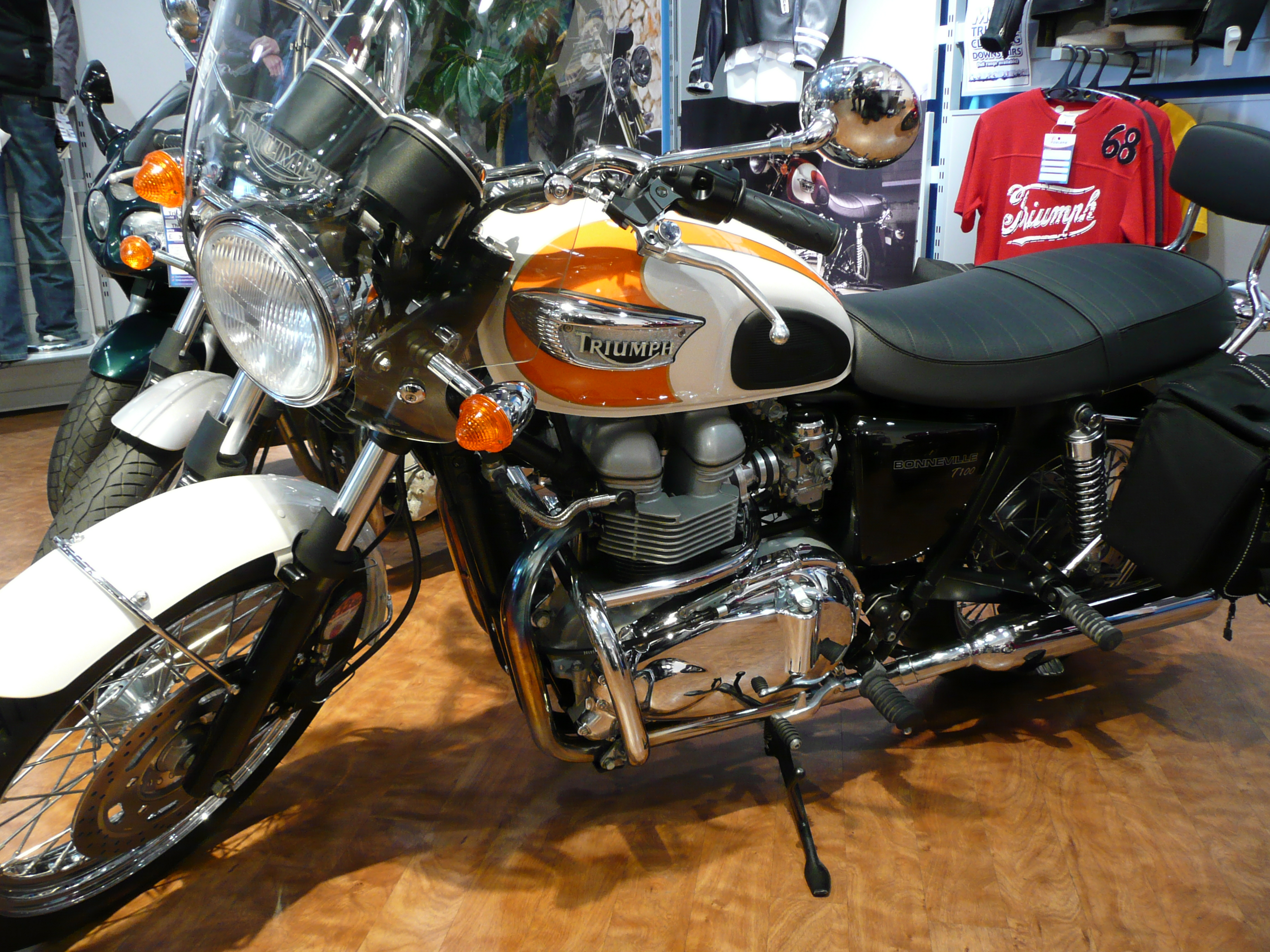
- Manufacturer: Triumph Motorcycles Ltd
- Also called: "Bonnie"
- Production: 2002–2004 790 cc 2005–2016 865 cc 2017 on 900 cc
- Class: Standard
- Engine: 865 cc (52.8 cu in) air-cooled, DOHC, parallel-twin, 360° 900 cc (55 cu in) liquid-cooled, SOHC, 270° parallel-twin
- Bore / stroke: 90 mm × 68 mm (3.5 in × 2.7 in); 84.6 mm × 80 mm (3.33 in × 3.15 in)
- Top speed: 115 mph (est.)
- Power: 61 hp (45 kW) @ 7,400 rpm (2002); 67 hp (50 kW) @ 7,400 rpm (2012); 54 hp (40 kW) @ 5,900 rpm (2017) (claimed)
- Torque: 59 lb⋅ft (80 N⋅m)@ 3,230 rpm (2017) (claimed)
- Transmission: 5-speed gearbox with chain final drive
- Wheelbase: 59.1 in (1,500 mm)
- Dimensions: L: 87.8 in (2,230 mm); W: 29.1 in (740 mm); H: 43.3 in (1,100 mm)
- Seat height: 30.5 inches (770 mm)
- Weight: 451 lb (205 kg) (dry); 506 lb (230 kg) (wet)
- Fuel capacity: 3.5 imp gal (16 L)

The Bonneville T100 is a motorcycle designed and built by Triumph Motorcycles Ltd in Hinckley, Leicestershire, UK.

== Development ==
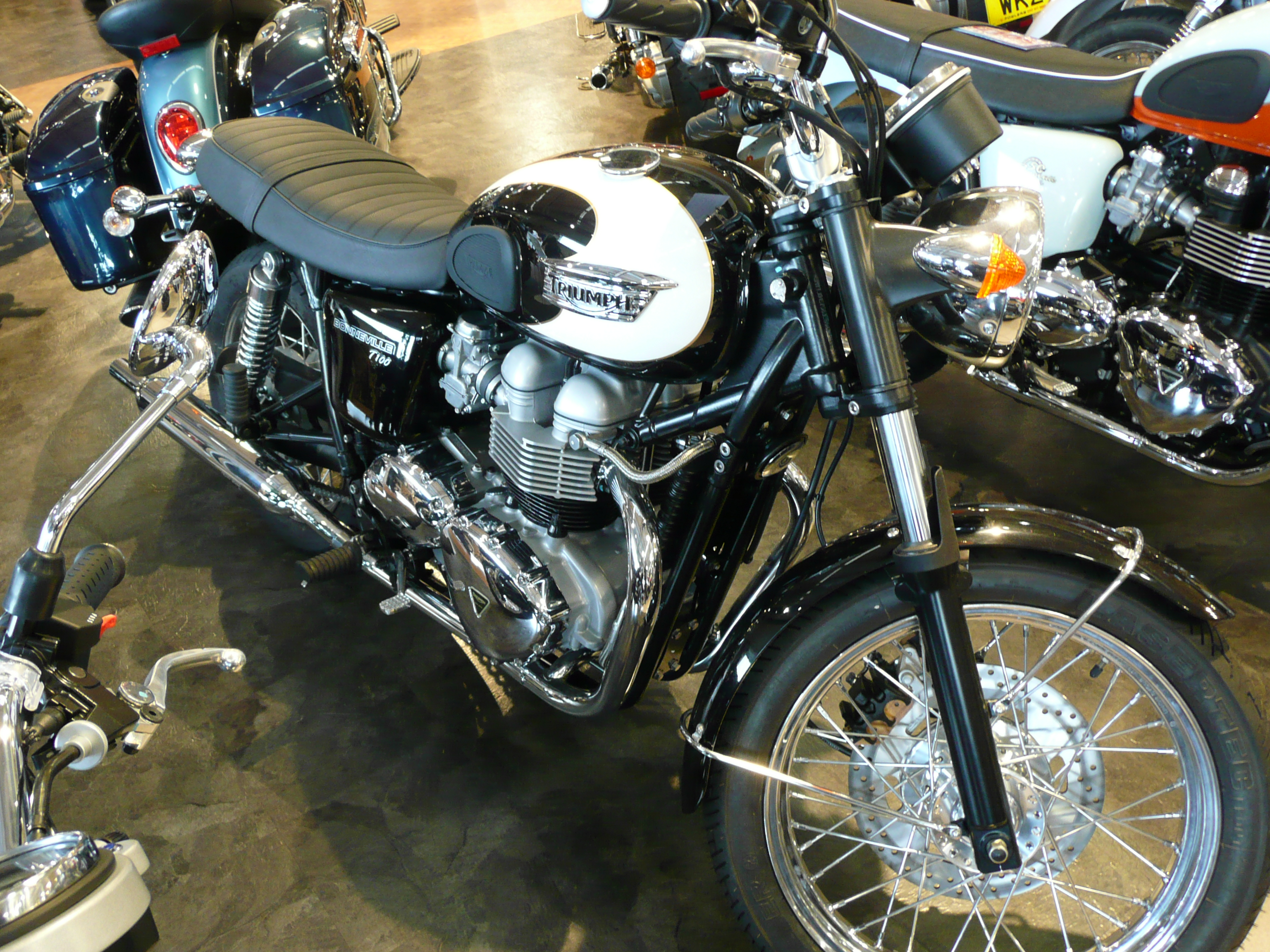
Triumph Bonneville T100 (2008)

Triumph launched the first new Bonneville in 15 years, the Bonneville 790, at the Munich Motorcycle Show in September 2000, with a 790 cc (48 cu in) 360° crankshaft parallel-twin engine. The T100 Bonneville, styled by John Mockett and David Stride, was launched as an uprated version initially with the 790 cc engine, and from 2005 with the 865 cc engine introduced on the 2004 Thruxton, and fitted to all Bonnevilles from 2007.

The designation comes from the T100 models produced by Triumph between 1959 and the mid-1970s and it is sold as part of Triumph's "Modern classics" range. The engine features double electrically heated carburetors. Triumph added an air injection unit near the spark plug to meet emission regulations introduced in 2007.

For 2008, the T100 (like all Bonneville-based models) was further updated with fuel injection to meet new Euro 3 emissions legislation. In addition to running more cleanly than a carbureted engine, the fuel-injected system is easier to start from cold. To retain the 'retro' styling, the fuel injectors are hidden behind throttle bodies designed to resemble carburetors.

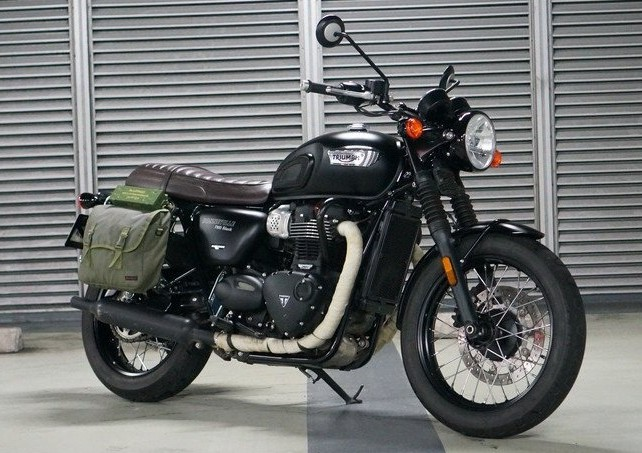
liquid cooled Triumph Bonneville T100 Black 2017

For 2017 a host of updates have been made for the T100 model, a displacement increase to 900cc, and the addition of liquid cooling, traction control, and the change from a 360° to 270° crank.

== Triumph 100th Anniversary Limited Edition ==
2002 was the 100th anniversary of Triumph motorcycles (1902 was the first year for Triumph), and for this special event, Triumph planned to produce a limited number of centennial Bonneville T100s in a "Lucifer orange" and silver paint scheme. But on 15 March 2002, while in the midst of preparing for its anniversary, its main factory was destroyed by fire, crippling most of its manufacturing capacity. Only a handful of centennial-edition T100s were produced in March 2002 before the fire, making them very rare. The remaining production run of centennial-edition T100s were actually 2003 models that were built after the factory was repaired from the fire damage; these remaining T100s had to be 2003-year models, as it was after September 2002 (into the 2003 model production year) before production started again. Even when combining the 2002 and 2003 bikes produced, only a few of these first-year modern T100 bikes were manufactured. Although exact numbers were not disclosed, the factory had promoted a limited run of 500 total units.

== Paul Smith signature series ==
In 2006, designer Paul Smith personally designed a signature series. Nine Triumph Bonneville T100's were customised with one-off paint schemes and used for display and promotion in Paul Smith designer shops. Although these were for sale through Paul Smith shops only, two of the original designs, the "Multi-Union" and "Live Fast" were put into limited production, with fifty of each design produced. Each motorcycle was individually numbered and authenticated with a certificate, signed by Paul Smith and John Bloor.

== Triumph Bonneville SE ==
Launched at the Triumph dealer conference in July 2008, the 'SE' (for Special Edition) featuring matching speedo and tachometer, special polished alloy covers on a black engine, chrome Triumph tank badge, cast wheels, upswept silencers, shortened mudguards and a lower and narrower seat. The 2009 SE takes its cues from the 1979 T140D Special Edition, which was the first Triumph to feature mag wheels and electronic ignition.

== Triumph Bonneville 50th Anniversary special ==
For 2009, a 50th Anniversary Bonneville, with only 120 released in the UK, which consume 15 percent of their market, and fewer than 200 in the US, which consume 27 percent of their market. This limited edition of just 650 Triumph T100 Bonnevilles with a new paint scheme harking back to 1959, has a two-tone blue paintjob with hand painted pinstripes featuring a unique two-tone Meriden Blue/Lucifer orange combination with each one individually numbered, a brass plate on the handlebar clamp and a certificate of authenticity, signed by John Bloor.

== See also ==
- Kawasaki W650
- Triumph Bonneville
- Triumph Bonneville 790
