= Bloor Homes =

British housebuilding company

Bloor Homes Limited
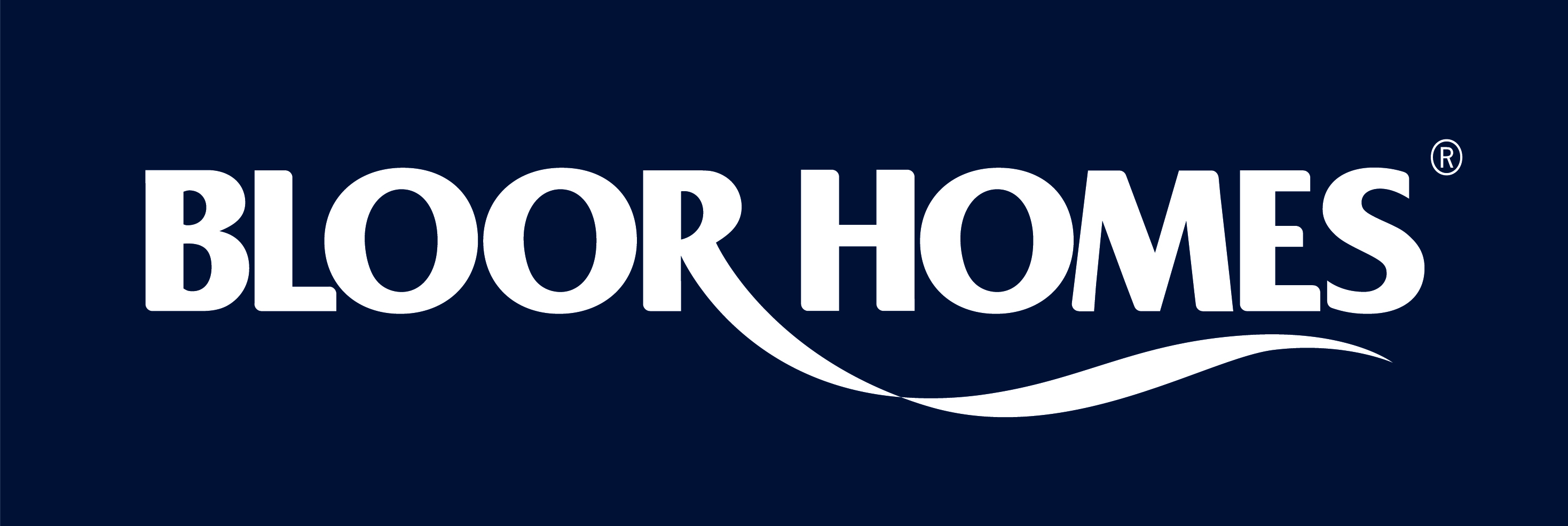
- Formerly: J.S. Bloor (Newbury) Limited (1987–2010)
- Company type: Private company
- Industry: Housebuilding
- Founded: 1969; 57 years ago
- Headquarters: Measham, Leicestershire
- Area served: United Kingdom
- Key people: John Bloor (owner)
- Products: Home construction
- Parent: Bloor Holdings Limited
- Website: bloorhomes.com

Bloor Homes Limited is a British housebuilder based in Measham, Leicestershire. It is Britain’s largest privately owned housebuilder.

Bloor Homes was established in 1969 by John Bloor. The 2000s was a particularly profitable decade for the first, the firm was selling 1,870 houses annually. During the 2008 financial crisis, Bloor Homes transferred some of its unsold homes to the public sector, reduced its involvement in apartment construction and cut subcontractor payments.

By 2012, it was reportedly building around 1,800 homes per year; six years later, the company was completing 3,200 homes annually. The company's value was such that, due to his large stake in the business, John Bloor became the richest man in Britain's construction sector during the 2010s.

== History ==
The company was founded by John Bloor in 1969. Unlike many housebuilders, John Bloor has long retained a large stake in the ownership of Bloor Homes; by 2018, he was reportedly the richest man in Britain's construction sector, valued at almost £3.4 billion.

During 2002, Bloor Homes recorded 1,870 annual housing sales, making it the largest housebuilder in Britain to be owned by a single person. Over the following two years, while sales volume remained relatively static, the firm's profits continued to rise, which was attributed to increasing house prices. By 2006, Bloor Home's margin was reportedly 20 percent.

The company was negatively impacted by the Great Recession. In 2008, Bloor Homes announced that it would cut payments to its subcontractors, a decision which it attributed to commercial pressure. That same year, it became the first housebuilder to make use of a government scheme to partially-finance the transfer of unsold homes to the public sector. During mid 2009, after sustaining a £52 million loss, the firm announced that it would reduce its involvement in the construction of apartments; it also withdrew from a £35 million regeneration project in Cobridge, Staffordshire.

By 2012, Bloor Homes was reportedly building around 1,800 homes per year. Three years later, this rate had increased to 2,000 per year, which was largely attributed to an upturn in the British economy. During 2016, Bloor Homes was one of the largest privately owned housebuilding groups in Britain; the combined group was worth around £725 million. In 2018, Bloor Homes recorded the completion of 3,200 homes annually.

During January 2023, the firm recorded a pre-tax profit for the previous year of £317.6 million, a sharp increase from £261.8 million in 2021; this was stated to be due to a combination of additional sales completed and house price inflation. Inflation also increased costs, which negatively impacted Bloor Homes' bottom line and contributed to a drop in turnover for 2023.

In February 2024, Bloor Homes was among eight UK house-builders targeted by the Competition and Markets Authority in an investigation into suspected breaches of competition law. The CMA said it had evidence that firms shared commercially sensitive information with competitors, influencing the build-out of sites and the prices of new homes. In January 2025, the CMA said it was conducting further investigations into the suspected anti-competitive conduct. In June 2025, the CMA investigation was extended to August 2025. In July 2025, the housebuilders offered to pay £100 million towards affordable housing programme as part of an agreement to reform practices on information sharing and end the investigation without admitting any liability or wrongdoing. On 30 October 2025, the CMA confirmed its investigation had been dropped in return for a £100m payment towards affordable homes and other measures including the development of industry-wide guidance on information sharing and agreements not to share certain types of information with other housebuilders.
