= Triumph Speedmaster =

British motorcycle

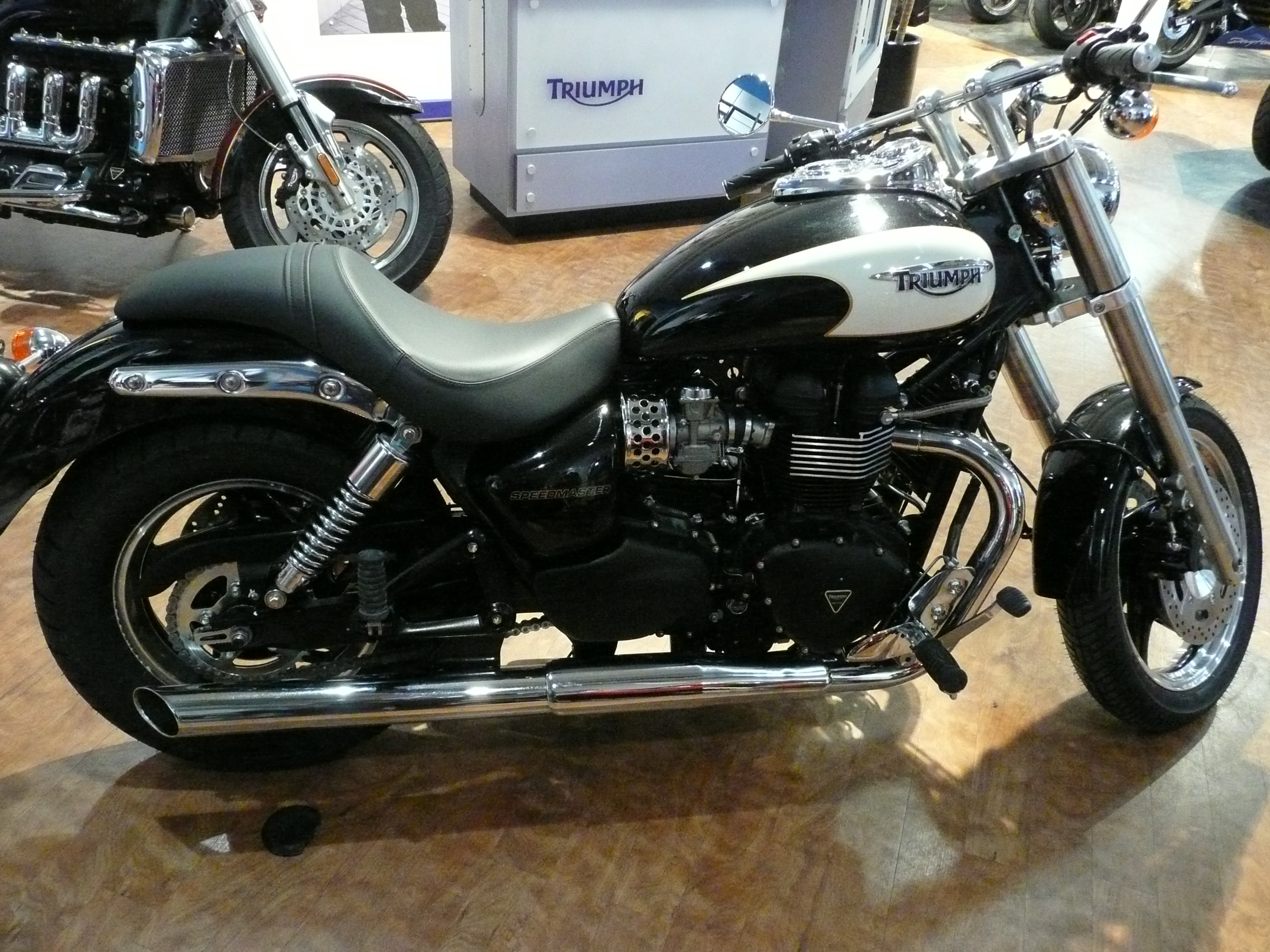
- Manufacturer: Triumph Motorcycles Ltd
- Production: 2002–2004 790 cc (48 cu in); 2005–2007 865 cc (52.8 cu in) (carburettor) since 2008 865 cc (52.8 cu in) (fuel injection)
- Class: Cruiser
- Engine: 2002–2004 790 cc (48 cu in), 2005-2017 865 cc (52.8 cu in) air-cooled, 2018-current 1,200 cc (73 cu in) liquid-cooled DOHC, parallel-twin, 270°
- Top speed: 2002–2004 103 mph (166 km/h)
- Power: 2002–2004 53.1 hp (39.6 kW), 2005-2017 61 bhp (45 kW), 2018-current 77 bhp (57 kW)
- Torque: 40.3 lbf⋅ft (54.6 N⋅m), Since 2005 44.3 lbf⋅ft (60.1 N⋅m)
- Transmission: 5-speed gearbox, chain final drive
- Wheelbase: 1,660 mm (65.2 in)
- Dimensions: L: 2,420 mm (95.3 in); W: 830 mm (32.7 in); H: 1,160 mm (45.7 in)
- Seat height: 720 mm (28.3 in)
- Weight: 2002–2004 260 kg (580 lb) (wet)
- Fuel capacity: 4.3 imp gal (20 L; 5.2 US gal)

The Speedmaster is a Triumph cruiser motorcycle designed and built in Hinckley, Leicestershire. Launched in 2002 with a 790 cc (48 cu in) twin-cylinder engine, the displacement was increased to 865 cc (52.8 cu in) in 2005, upgraded to fuel injection in 2008, and in 2018 the displacement was increased to 1,200 cc (73 cu in).

== Development ==
The Triumph Speedmaster was launched in 2003 as a 'factory custom' cruiser based on the Bonneville America. The original model had the 790 cc (48 cu in) air-cooled DOHC twin engine and had an extended 1,660 mm (65.2 in) wheelbase with the crankshaft at 270°. Main differences from the Bonneville America included black finish to the engine, shortened gearing, a flat handlebar on risers, one piece saddle and cast alloy wheels with twin front discs, in place of the single disc of the America. The 'Speedmaster' name was last used in 1965 for the Bonneville T120R by American importers but not by the Triumph factory.

The first generation 2003–2004 790 cc (48 cu in) model had 53.1 hp (39.6 kW) at the rear wheel, with a top speed of 166 km/h (103 mph). In 2005, the engine capacity was increased to 865 cc (52.8 cu in) (carburettor-fuelled) delivering peak power at 6,500 rpm, with maximum torque of 68 Nm available at 3,500 rpm. In 2007, a multipoint sequential fuel injection model was launched, with new design alloy wheels, a restyled chain cover, pillion footrest hanger and upper fork shrouds, as well as slash cut silencers and four new paint schemes.

A new Speedmaster marque was reintroduced in 2018 as the Bonneville Speedmaster, from Triumph's 'Modern Classics' line. Featuring the all new 2017 Bonneville's 1200cc High Torque liquid-cooled engine, the 2018 Speedmaster re-purposed the Triumph Bobber Black's faux-hardtail chassis into a light-duty tourer by adding a larger fuel tank (3.17 gal. vs. the Bobber's 2.4 gal.), larger rider's seat and pillion seat with passenger foot pegs, 'beach bar' handlebars with more pullback, forward controls, chrome exhausts and accents, and a rear fender with mounting points for optional saddlebags.

Just like the Bobber Black, the 2018 Speedmaster has a ride-by-wire throttle allowing for selectable 'Rain' and 'Road' modes that modulate throttle response, and one-touch cruise-control; ABS and traction control; LED lighting with daytime running light; twin front disc brakes with Brembo calipers; upgraded KYB front forks; and larger tires.

== See also ==
- List of Triumph motorcycles
