= Triumph Bonneville 790 =

British motorcycle

Triumph Bonneville 790 cc
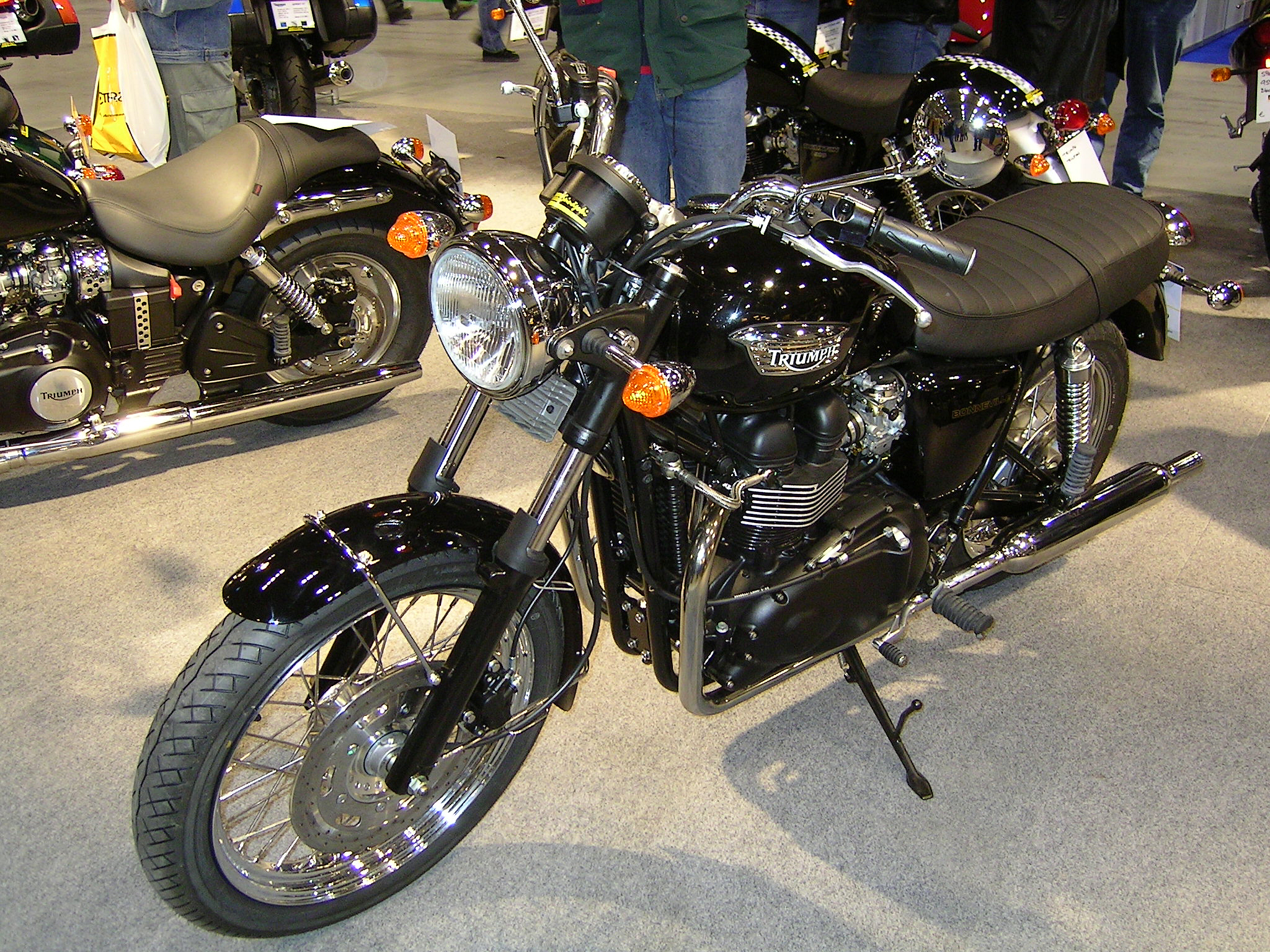
- Manufacturer: Triumph Motorcycles Ltd
- Also called: "Bonnie"
- Production: 2001–2007 (790 cc); 2007– (865 cc)
- Engine: 790 cc (48 cu in) air-cooled, DOHC, parallel-twin, 360-degree
- Bore / stroke: 86 mm × 68 mm (3.4 in × 2.7 in)
- Power: 62 hp (46 kW) @ 7400 rpm
- Torque: 44 lb⋅ft (60 N⋅m) @ 3500 rpm
- Transmission: 5-speed gearbox with chain final drive
- Wheelbase: 59.1 inches (1,500 mm)
- Dimensions: H: 43.3 inches (1,100 mm)
- Weight: 451 pounds (205 kg) (dry)
- Fuel capacity: 3.75 imperial gallons (17.0 L)

The Triumph Bonneville 790 cc is a British motorcycle that was designed and built in Hinckley, Leicestershire by Triumph Motorcycles Ltd between 2001 and 2007, when the engine size was increased to 865 cc.

== Development ==
Triumph launched the first new Bonneville for 15 years at the Munich Motorcycle Show in September 2000, with a 790 cc, 360-degree crank, parallel-twin engine. Triumph's development team had originally designed a prototype they called the 9O8MD project in April 1997, an 'entry-level' medium displacement motorcycle for the export market.

Market research indicated that Triumph's heritage was an important factor for overseas buyers, so Export Manager Ross Clifford decided to develop a parallel engine layout that could combine the latest technology with classic engine architecture. By the Summer of 1997 the concept had been agreed and the chassis and engine design teams began development work. The styling of the new bike had to link the heritage look to a modern handling frame. The team began with a fully restored 1969 Bonneville T120 and worked on the design throughout 1998. By August 1998, the first styling review of a full size three-dimensional model was completed by sales and marketing as well as engineering departments.

The first 'Bonneville' engine was tested on 15 December 1998. The prototype engines were run for extended periods of time before committing to tooling production. By the end of 1998, the chassis team had completed their work on the styling prototype. In March 1999, the new engine was run in the prototype chassis for the first time and full scale road testing began, with the first six development bikes built in July 1999. Four were mainly used for engine testing and the remaining two for chassis development work. By September 1999, the final review of the production Bonneville's styling and specification was completed by Triumph's sales and marketing teams and final testing was completed in July 2000, well in time for the dealership launch.

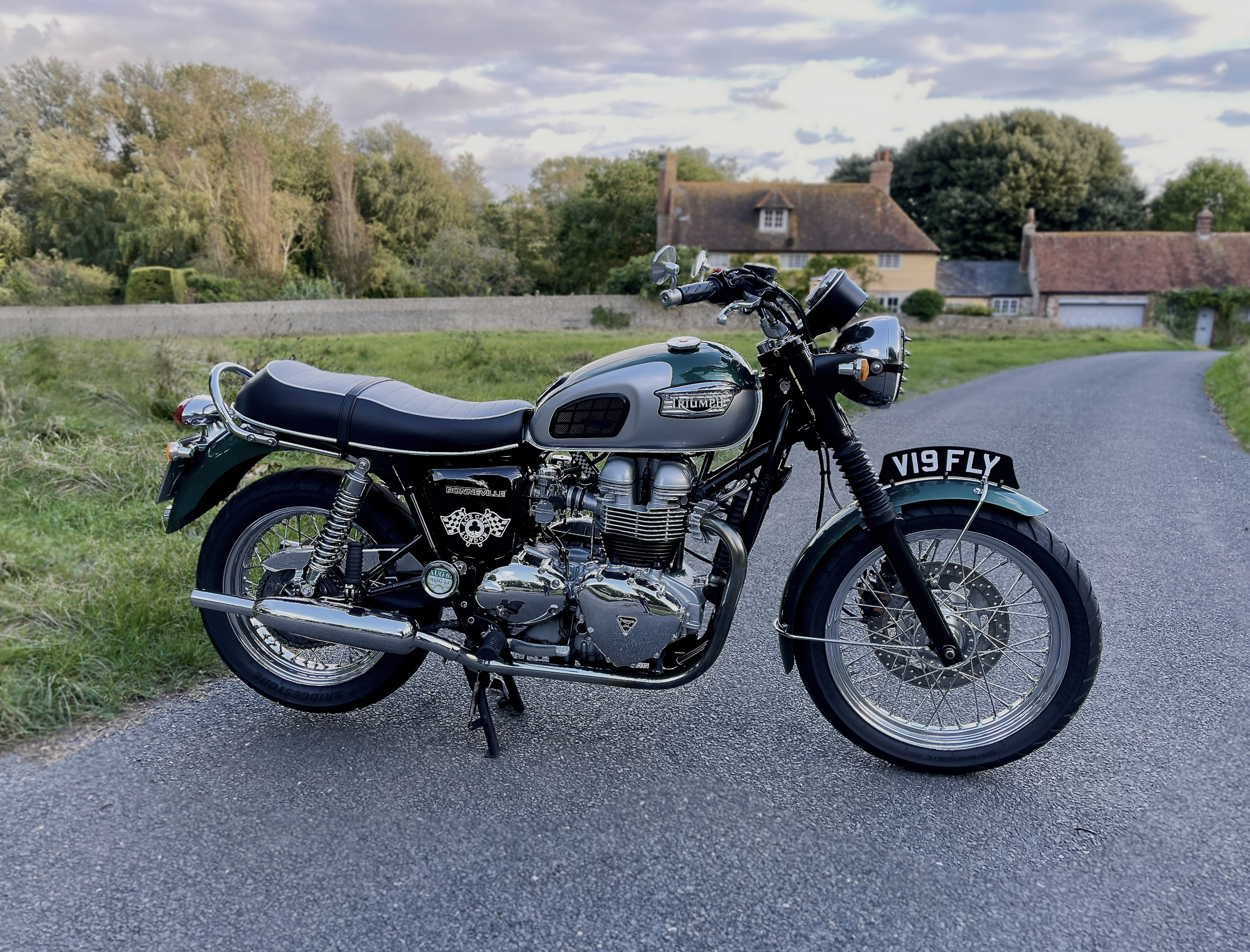
The 4th Bonneville to come off the Hinckley production line in November 2000

== Engine design ==
'Traditional' engine capacities of 750 cc and even the original 650 cc were considered before 790 cc was chosen. The 86 mm bore size worked well with the four-valves per cylinder layout, while the 68 mm stroke allowed a long conrod that helps to minimise secondary vibration, although Triumph engineers also altered the bar weights to restore a little 'character' vibration. Designer David Stride was able to add details that retained the look of the original, such as a finned cylinder and dummy pushrod tube (which functions as a cylinder head oil breather) and internal oil lines to create a clean appearance.

As well as the desired low and midrange performance, the engine is capable of 115 mph (185 km/h) and produces a respectable peak power output of 61 bhp (45 kW) @ 7400 rpm, with maximum torque of 44 lbf⋅ft (60 N⋅m) @ 3500 rpm, with 90% of the engine's torque output available from 2750 rpm all the way to the rev limit.

The engine was air-cooled like the original, but had twin overhead camshafts instead of the old model's pushrod valve operation. A frame mounted oil cooler ensured consistent running temperatures and camshaft drive is by chain between the cylinders and incorporates an idler gear that allowed the cylinder head to be kept very compact.

== Gearbox and cycle parts ==
The gearbox was the well-proven Triumph 955i unit as a five-speed to a cable-operated wet clutch and reversed, with the final drive chain on the right instead of the left. This allows the traditional Triumph twin layout of small triangular engine cover on the right and larger clutch case on the left. Instead of fuel injection the team opted for a pair of 36 mm Keihin carburettors with electric heaters to help cold starting and a throttle-position sensor linked to digital ignition to optimise throttle response.

The 'peashooter' twin exhausts were designed longer than usual to meet the silencing requirements, and a kink was added to improve ground clearance. The engine is solidly mounted in the frame at five points with counter-balancers removing the need for rubber mounts. Suspension was provided by twin Kayaba rear shocks and non-adjustable 41 mm Kayaba telescopic forks, set at a 29-degree head angle, with 117 mm of trail. A 19-inch front wheel was offset by a 17-inch rear and the relatively long 58.8-inch (1,490 mm) wheelbase and low 30.5-inch (770 mm) seat height give the new Bonneville the 'lean' look of the original.

== Upgrades ==
For 2004 the engine was updated with a black finish, and in 2007 production of the 790 cc Bonneville ended when the engine size was increased to 865 cc.

== See also ==
- List of Triumph motorcycles
- Triumph Bonneville
- Triumph Bonneville T100
