= Triumph Bonneville America =

British motorcycle

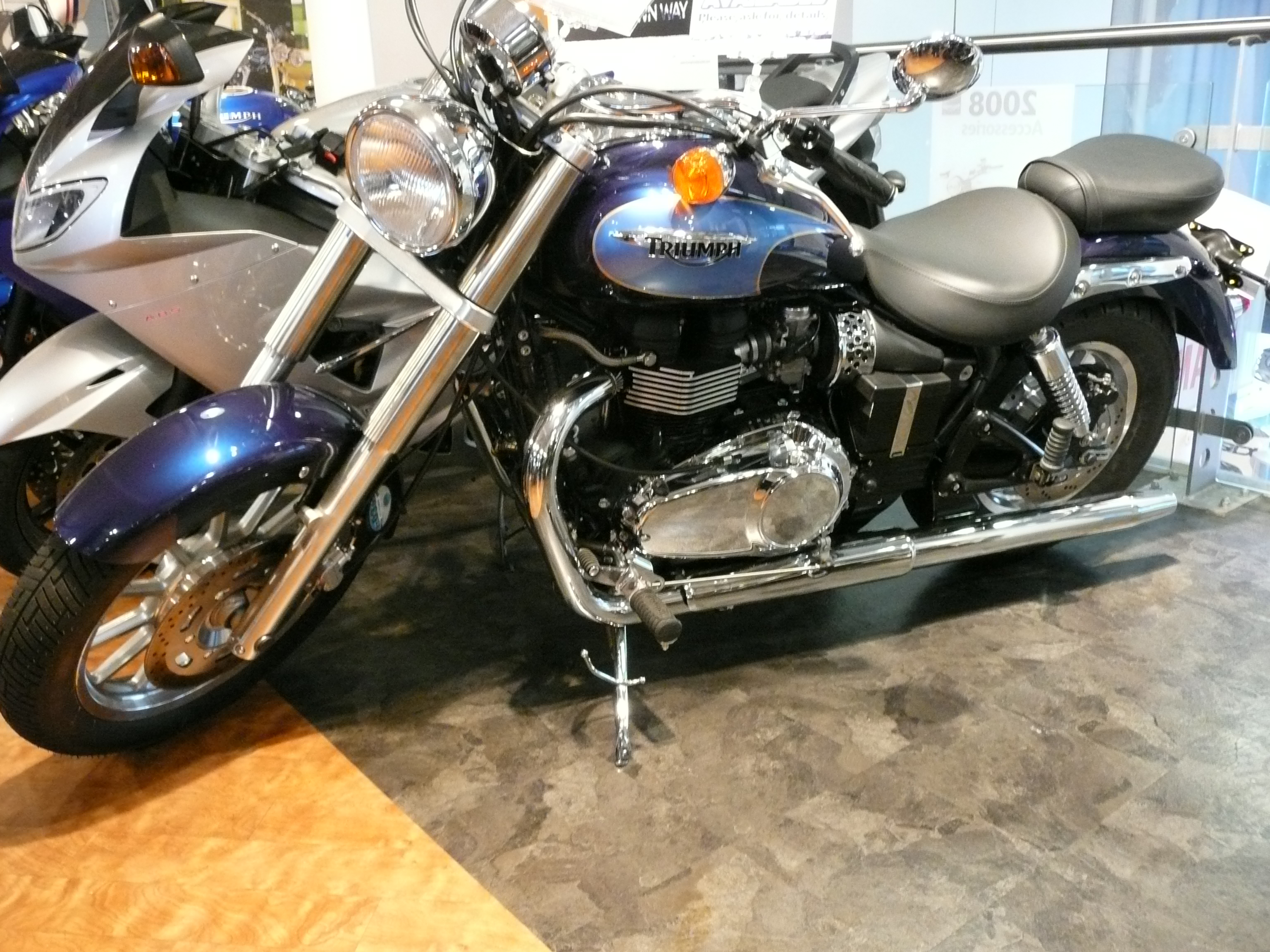
- Manufacturer: Triumph Motorcycles Ltd
- Production: 2002-2006 790 cc (carbureted); 2007 865 cc (carbureted); 2008 865 cc (fuel injected)
- Engine: 865 cc air-cooled, DOHC, parallel-twin, 270 degree firing angle
- Power: 61 bhp (45 kW) @ 6,800 rpm
- Torque: 50.9 lbf⋅ft (69.0 N⋅m) @ 4,800rpm
- Transmission: 5-speed gearbox with chain final drive
- Wheelbase: 65.2 inches (1,660 mm)
- Dimensions: L: 95.4 inches (2,420 mm); W: 32.7 inches (830 mm); H: 45.7 inches (1,160 mm)
- Seat height: 28.3 inches (720 mm)
- Weight: dry weight 504 pounds (229 kg) (dry)
- Fuel capacity: 4.3 imperial gallons (20 L)

The Triumph Bonneville America is a British motorcycle designed and built in Hinckley, Leicestershire by Triumph Motorcycles Ltd.

== Development ==
Compared with the standard Bonneville, the Bonneville America has a very different ride, with the wheelbase extended 6.4 inches (160 mm) to 65.2 inches (1,660 mm), making it 6.8 inches (170 mm) longer overall. The saddle was lowered 2.2 inches (56 mm) and the steering head rake angle increased by 4.3 degrees giving a 33.3 degree rake. The America had the Bonneville's 12.2-inch (310 mm) front disc but the front wheel was reduced to 18 inches (460 mm) diameter and the rear wheel to 15 inches (380 mm) with a larger 11.2-inch (280 mm) disc brake. The America also had a larger fuel tank with a 'chromed' plastic console to house the filler, 4.5-inch (110 mm) diameter speedometer and warning lights. The side panels were extended with sheet-metal covers over the passenger-peg brackets and perforated chrome fittings behind the carburetors to provide the 'retro look' of the air-filter covers from the 1960 Triumph twins. The rider's footrests were also moved to the front of the engine to create a 'cruiser' riding position.

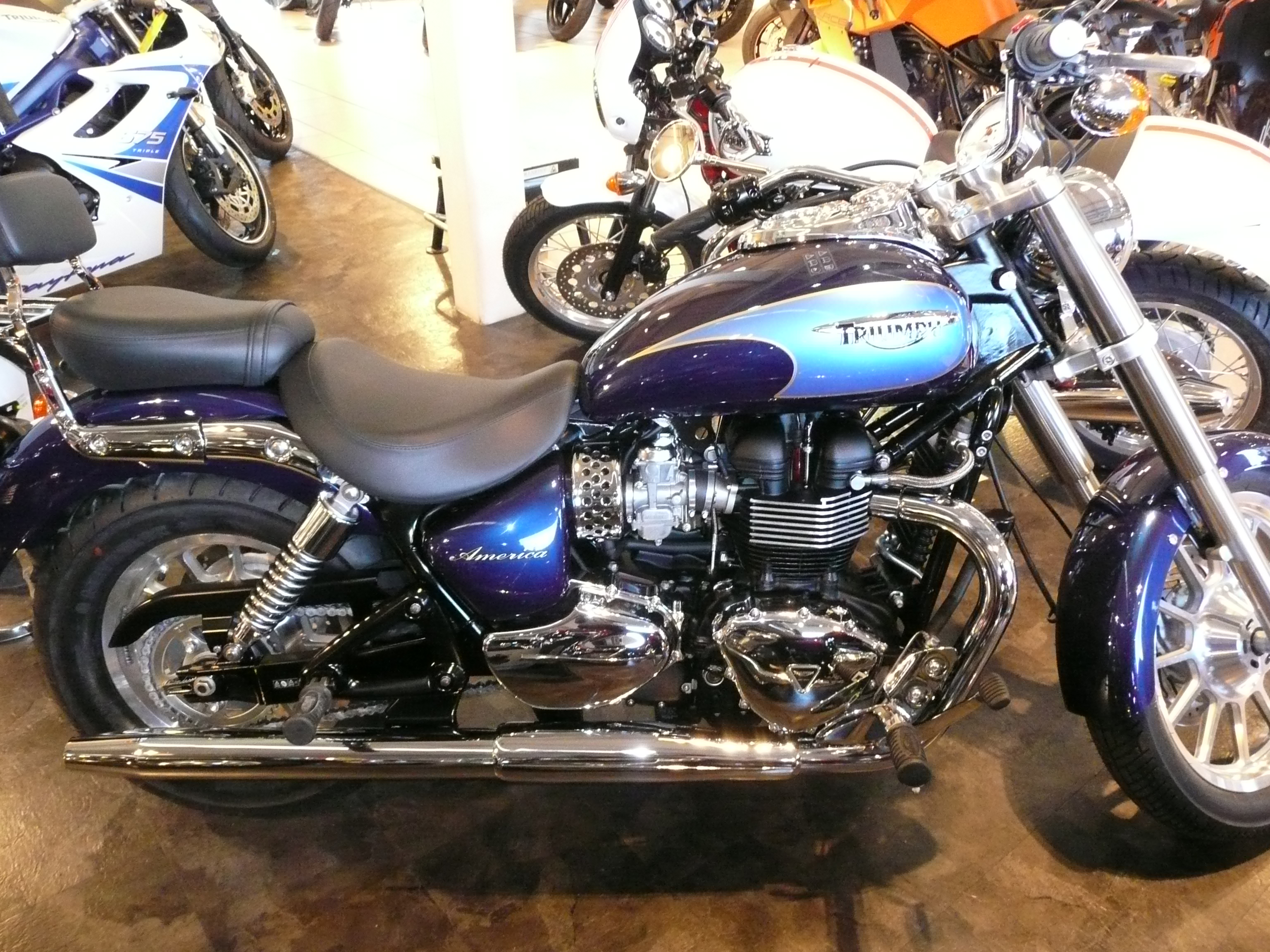

=== 2007 ===
In 2007, the engine capacity was increased to 865 cc (carbureted) delivering peak power of 54 bhp (40 kW) at 6,800 rpm, with maximum torque of 69 N⋅m (51 lbf⋅ft) available at 4,800 rpm. Fuel economy is approximately 45 miles per US gallon (5.2 L/100 km; 54 mpg_{‑imp}) city and 50 miles per US gallon (4.7 L/100 km; 60 mpg_{‑imp}) highway. The update included new 'reverse cone' chrome silencers, a new design of cast alloy wheels, adjustable clutch and front brake levers and a new all black engine finish with chromed covers. The chrome chain cover, pillion footrest hanger and upper fork shrouds were restyled and a more comfortable pillion seat fitted.

=== 2008 ===
In 2008, the UK version of the Bonneville America was further updated with an electronic fuel injection system to meet the European emission legislation, with the fuel injectors concealed by dummy carburetors. The US version of the Bonneville America was not updated to EFI until 2009.

== See also ==
- List of Triumph motorcycles
- Triumph Bonneville
