= Triumph Scrambler =

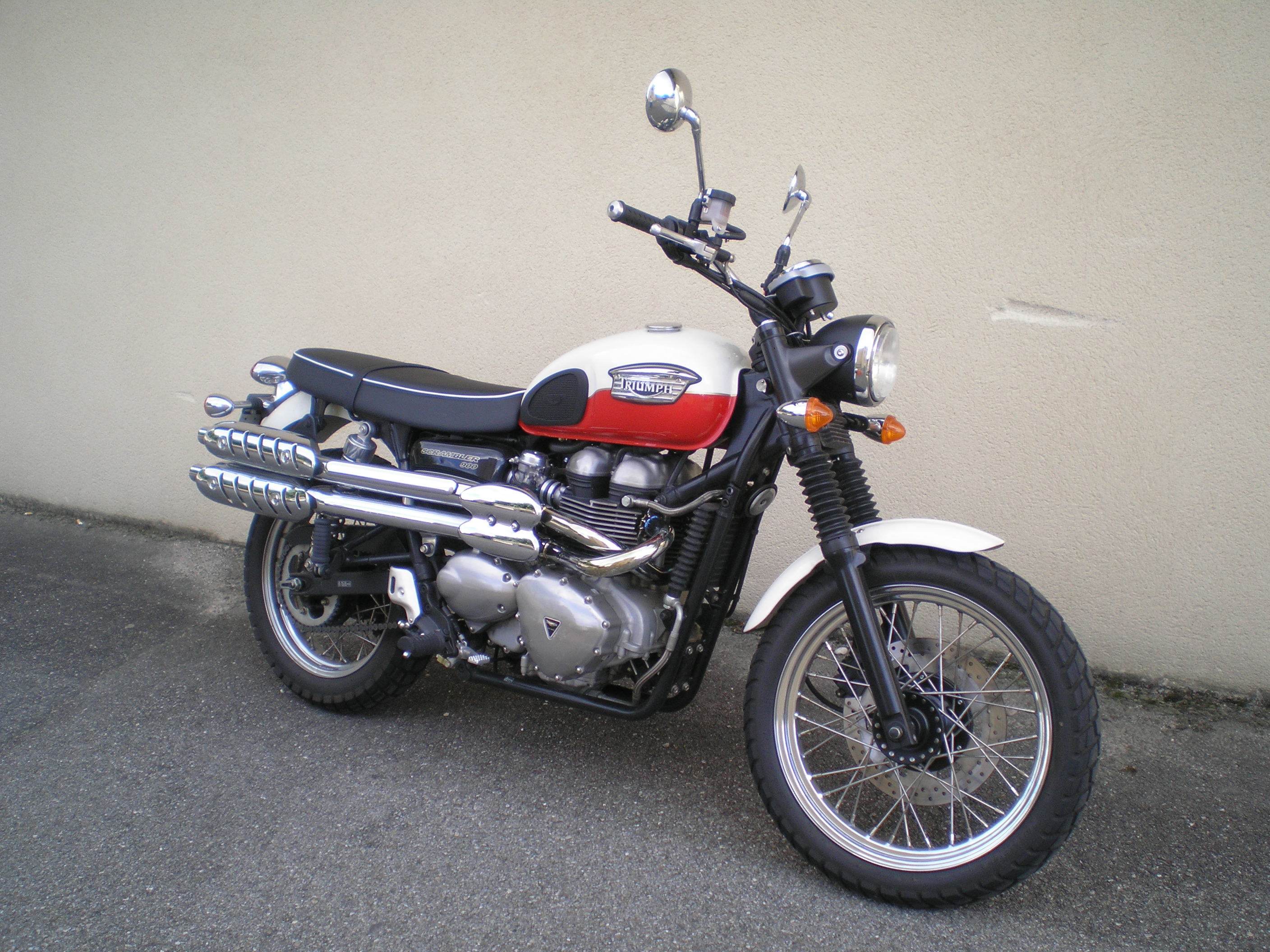
- Manufacturer: Triumph
- Production: 2006-2016
- Engine: 865 cc DOHC four-stroke twin
- Transmission: 5-speed chain drive
- Wheelbase: 59.0 in (1,499 mm)
- Dimensions: L: 87.1 in (2,212 mm)
- Weight: 454 pounds (206 kg) (dry)
- Fuel capacity: 16 L (3.5 imp gal; 4.2 US gal)

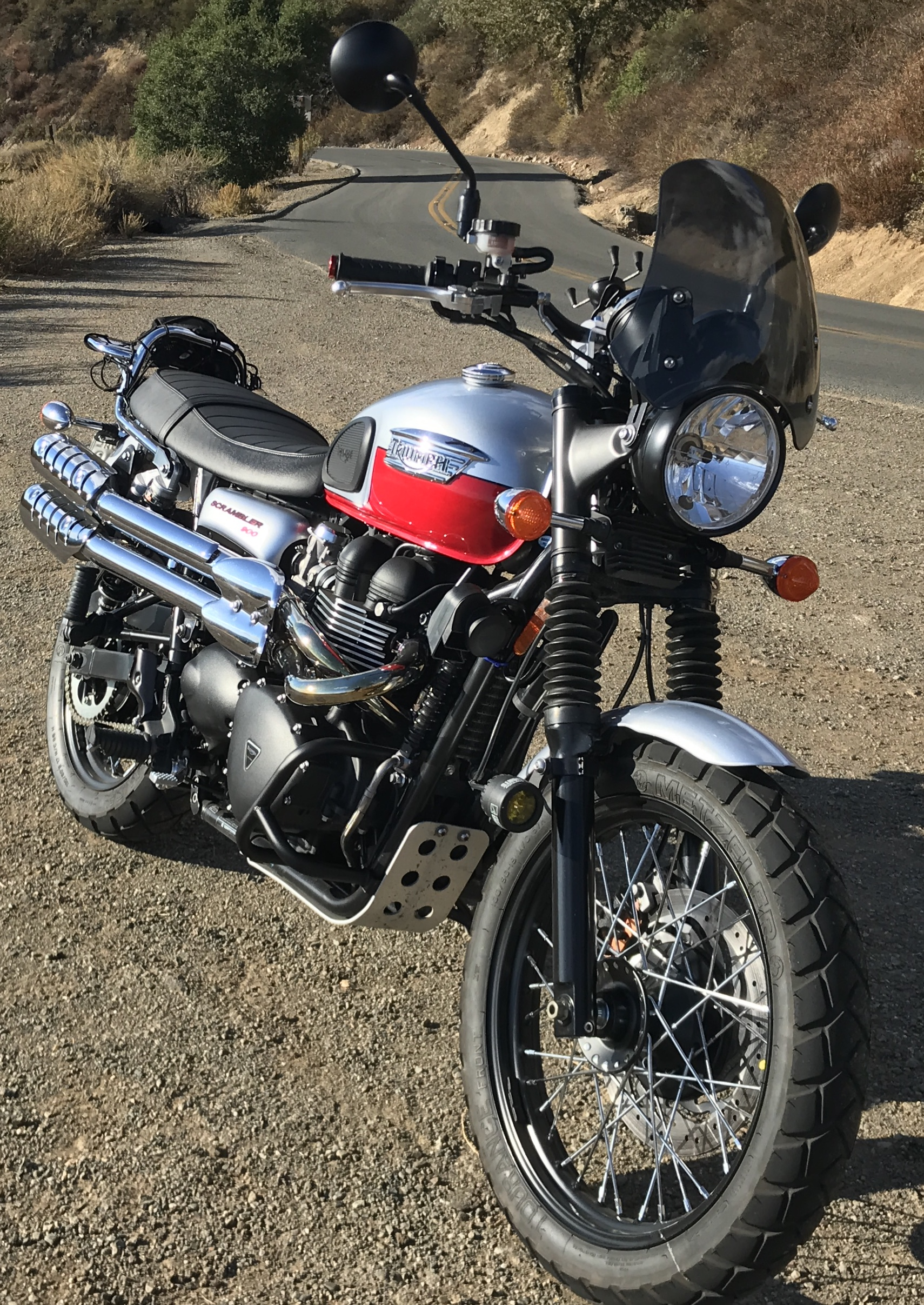
Example of modded Triumph Scrambler (2014)

The Triumph Scrambler is a British motorcycle made by Triumph Motorcycles. Launched in 2006, it was the last Triumph styled by designer John Mockett, who had begun working with the small factory team at Triumph in 1989, rationalising existing models based on a very successful modular design plan, including the concept and styling of the unfaired Trident triples for their 1990 IFMA launch. Mockett subsequently served as principal stylist for most of the bikes introduced up to 2006.

== Development ==
The Scrambler was designed as a Bonneville with off-road styling and limited off-road capability.

The TR6C Trophy Special was the major influence on the new Scrambler, and the new bike shared the same key features – most obviously including the high level stacked twin exhausts and crossover exhaust headers, though Triumph had to swap sides (from left to right) with the stacked pipes because the battery box got in the way for running them on the left hand side.

The Scrambler also featured a high, wide handlebar, a higher seat position, twin chromed Kayaba rear shock absorbers (with increased 106 mm travel), 41 mm Kayaba front forks with 120 mm travel and rubber fork gaiters, a small single headlight with a simple speedo, and chunky, knobbly Bridgestone tyres on the thin 36-spoke 19 x 2.5-inch front wheel and the 40-spoke 17 x 3.5-inch rear wheel.

A whole range of Triumph Factory accessories was designed for the Scrambler, including a skid plate to protect the underneath of the engine, engine bars, a headlamp grille, number boards for the sides, an optional tachometer on early models (twin side by side speedometer and tachometer became standard from 2010 model year), a handlebar brace and pad, and even a single seat with fixed rear luggage rack behind. A popular aftermarket addition is a two-into-one performance exhaust system from Arrow.

The engine was the 865 cc parallel twin from the Bonneville (but using the 270° crank from the America/Speedmaster cruiser models) with twin carburetors, detuned to boost torque at low engine speeds, with peak power 54 hp (40 kW) at 7,000 rpm, and maximum torque of 69 N⋅m (51 lbf⋅ft) available at 5,000 rpm. Multipoint sequential electronic fuel injection with SAI was introduced in 2008 (2009 in the USA) necessitating the fitting of a larger fuel tank that housed the new pump unit. Throttle bodies were disguised to look like carburetors to maintain the Scrambler's retro looks.

== Scrambler 1200 ==
Triumph Scrambler 1200 XE/XC
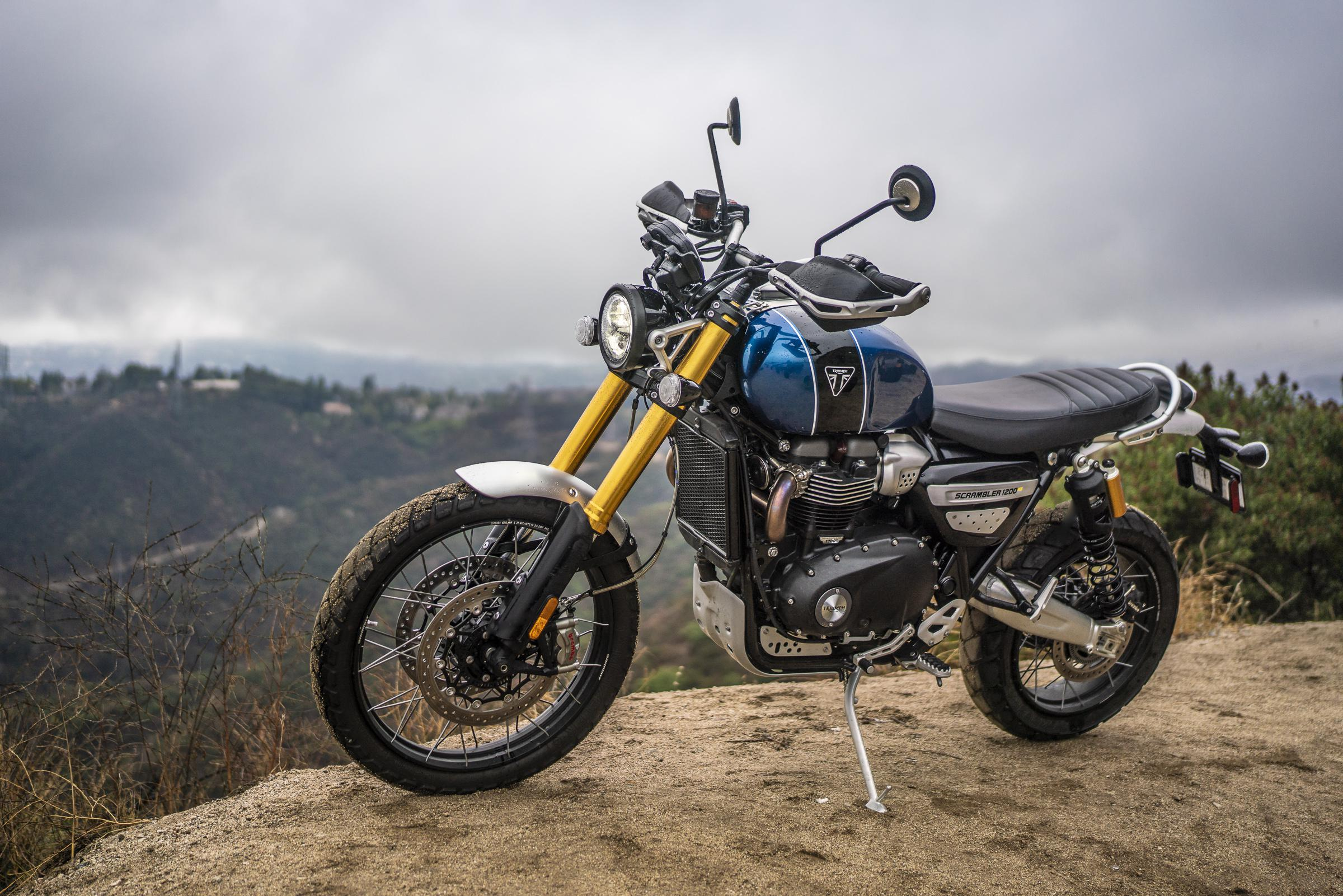
- Triumph Scrambler 1200 XE parked in the mountains of southern California
- Manufacturer: Triumph
- Production: 2019-present
- Class: Dual-sport motorcycle
- Engine: 1200 cc SOHC four-stroke parallel twin
- Transmission: 6-speed chain drive
- Wheelbase: 61.8 in (1,570 mm)
- Dimensions: L: 2,285 mm (90 in)
- Weight: 456 pounds (207 kg) (dry)
- Fuel capacity: 15.9 L (3.5 imp gal; 4.2 US gal)
- Related: Triumph Scrambler, Triumph Thruxton 1200

On August 9, 2018 Triumph released a teaser video for a version of the Scrambler with a similar 89 horsepower SOHC 1200cc engine present in the Thruxton. Formally announced on October 24 of 2019, the Scrambler 1200 was released in two trim levels, a more road oriented XC model and a 30mm taller, more adventure-focused XE model. Both models shared a 21" spoked tubeless front wheel as standard, with the XE model having an increased rake to complement the Showa front suspension.

== See also ==
- Triumph Engineering
- List of Triumph motorcycles
