= Les Harris (businessman) =

British motorcycle designer

- Born: 1939; United Kingdom
- Died: 17 February 2009 (aged 69–70)
- Occupations: Classic Motorcycle & Parts Manufacturer
- Spouse: Shirley Harris
- Children: 4

Leslie Frederick Harris (1939 – 17 February 2009) was an English businessman and motorcycle enthusiast who resurrected the Triumph Bonneville for a few years in the 1980s. Born in 1939, he was described as the "saviour of the British motorcycle industry". Invited to Buckingham Palace and the Houses of Parliament, in 1987 he was visited by the Prime Minister Margaret Thatcher. He died in February 2009, aged 69.

== L F Harris International Ltd ==
Harris began his own business in 1974 manufacturing and selling spare parts for classic motorcycles. As the leading British manufacturers such as Norton Motorcycles, BSA and Triumph went out of business, Harris bought as many spare parts as he could and set up L F Harris International Ltd at a warehouse in Newton Abbot. The venture was a success and he expanded by purchasing an engineering company in Leighton Buzzard and a retail shop in Paignton, Devon.

== Triumph motorcycle production ==
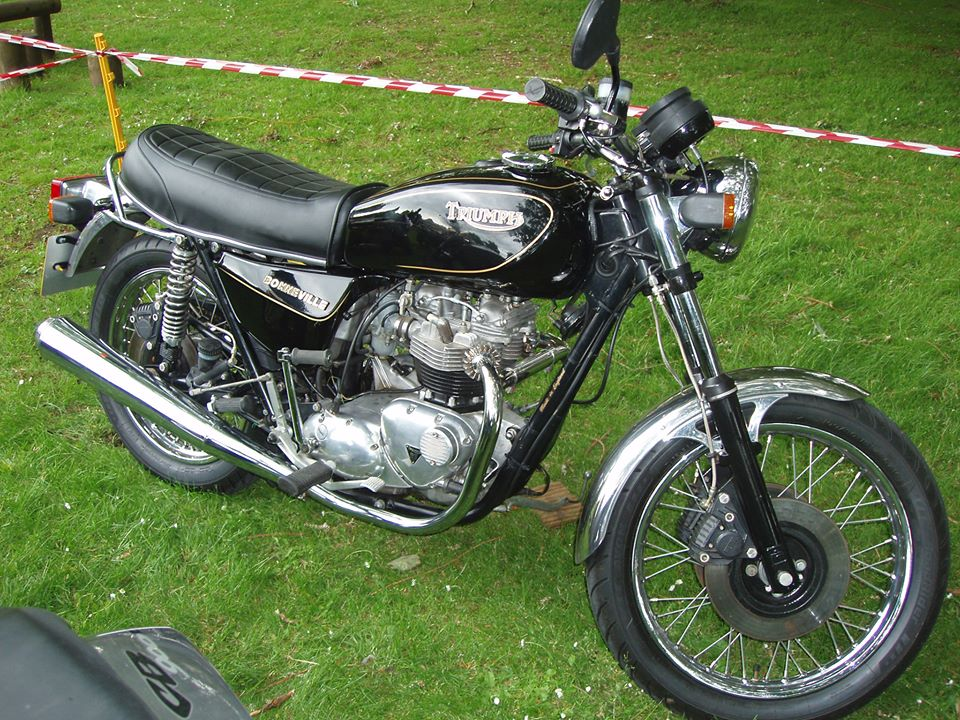
Triumph T140 Bonneville built under licence by LF Harris

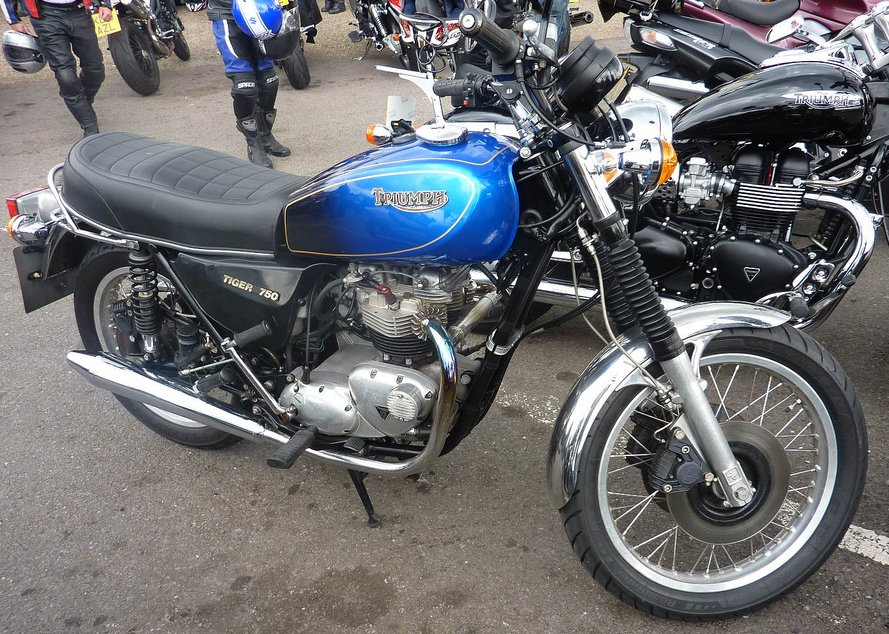
Rare Triumph TR7V Tiger built under licence by LF Harris fitted here with aftermarket silencers, direction indicators and rear suspension units. This model was also used by the Royal Signals Motorcycle Display Team.

When Triumph's Meriden motorcycle factory closed in, 1983 Harris bid for the rights to the Triumph name and the opportunity to build the Triumph Bonneville T140 with the former Meriden Triumph engineer Brian Jones as well as a number of former personnel from Meriden.

Instead, under a renewable five year licence starting from 28 November 1983 granted by the successful bidder, John Bloor, the new owner of Triumph, Harris manufactured 750 cc Bonnevilles (and some of the 750 cc single-carburettor TR7V Tiger models also used by the Royal Signals Motorcycle Display Team) until 1988.

The announcement of Harris restarting Bonneville production was made on 25 June 1985 at Forde House with local member of parliament Patrick Nicolls and motorcycling personalities such as Bert Hopwood in attendance.

Harris eventually moved to a bigger factory and warehouse and because of these 'Devon' Bonnevilles, Triumph can claim to have been in continuous production of motorcycles since 1902, with Triumph claiming to be the oldest continuous production motorcycle manufacturer in the world. There was no mutual agreement between Harris and Bloor to renew the manufacturing licence.

There was a lot of media interest in the venture and Harris was described as the "saviour of the British motorcycle industry". In fact, the Triumphs manufactured by Harris were distinct from Meriden-made models in having significantly more German and Italian component parts (such as Italian Brembo brakes, Paioli front suspension and Lafranconi silencers, German Magura switchgear, Varta battery and Merit horn) as the British motorcycle component industry had shrunk massively by the 1980s.

== The Matchless G80 ==
In 1988 Harris decided not to re-licence the rights to the Triumph and began to design his own version of a motorcycle, the Matchless G80. Fitted with a Rotax 494 cc air-cooled engine, there was also a Harris Matchless G80 built with a twin front disc brake and an electric starter. These were produced until the recession of 1990 when the business returned to producing much sought after spare parts for classic motorcycles. Harris also built eight Matchless G80s for trial with the White Helmets Display Team.

== Funeral ==
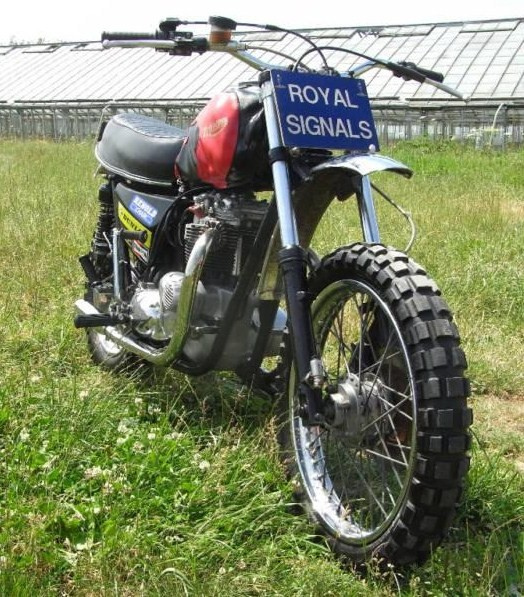
Royal Signals Motorcycle Display Team Triumph TR7V Tiger built under licence by LF Harris

Harris died at Torbay Hospital on 17 February 2009, aged 69, from a long-term illness of more than ten years. His company built the Triumph Tiger motorcycles used by the White Helmets Motorcycle Display Team, part of the Royal Corps of Signals. At his funeral at St Matthias Church, Torquay, six soldiers from the team carried his coffin and provided a 'throttle roar' in his memory.
