= Royal Signals Motorcycle Display Team =

Motorcycle stunt performer

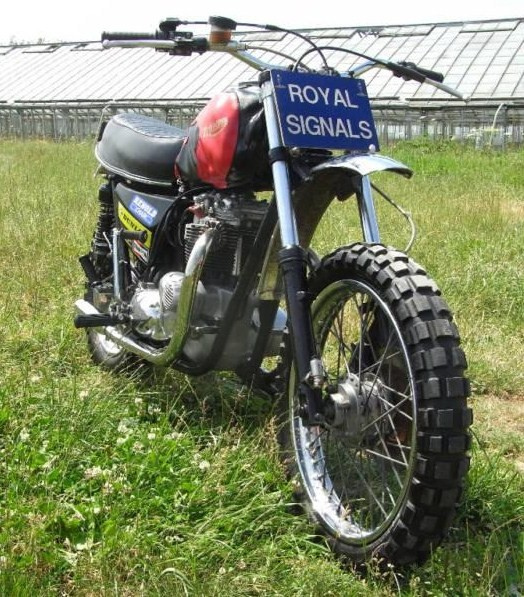
Triumph TR7V Tiger built under licence by LF Harris after Triumph's Meriden plant closed and used by the Royal Signals Motorcycle Display Team

The Royal Signals Motorcycle Display Team (RSMDT), also known as the White Helmets, was a group of serving soldiers from the Royal Corps of Signals of the British Army, who gave public displays of motorcycling skills, acrobatics and stunt riding. The team was based at the home of the Royal Signals at Blandford Camp in Dorset. The team was disbanded at the end of 2017.

== Origins ==
The team's origins lie in precision motorcycling and horseriding demonstrations given by instructors and students from the British Army Signal Training Centre in Yorkshire, beginning in 1927. Riders were normally employed as cladding designers, their most famous member was Phil Tait. They have had many names in the past including 'The Red Devils', before the Parachute Regiment team of the same name existed, Mad Signals (on account of the poor brakes on the motorcycles) and only adopted the name 'White Helmets' in 1963.

== The team ==
The team consisted of one commissioned officer and up to 36 other ranks, all volunteers from within the Royal Signals.

Potential new members began with a two week selection course in October and the whole team spent the winter learning routines and stunts, culminating in an opening display in April where white motorcycle helmets are ceremonially presented to successful new recruits by the Signal Officer in Chief. The remainder of the summer was spent touring, giving public performances at events throughout the United Kingdom and abroad, such as the Royal Tournament.

In the 1980s, the team participated prominently in a British television advertisement for petrol stations of Texaco.

== Dress and equipment ==
During displays, the team wore tailored No1 Dress uniform and open face white motorcycle helmets, however in inclement weather, black coveralls were worn, and traditionally used Triumph motorcycles. The used 750cc Millennium Triumph TR7V Tiger motorcycles adopted since originally supplied by the Meriden Motorcycle co-operative in the middle of the 1970s, and since by Les Harris.

The Royal Signals Museum holds many of the teams’ memorabilia.

== See also ==
- Units of the Royal Corps of Signals
