= T1000 =

T1000 may refer to:

== Transport ==
- T1000, the Rolls-Royce Trent 1000 jet engine
- OS T1000, a train used on the Oslo Metro
- T-1000 truck, a truck manufactured by Kenworth
- Pontiac T1000, an automobile also known as the Chevrolet Chevette
- SNCF Class T 1000, a French train class, predecessor of the SNCF Class T 2000

== Other uses ==
- T-1000, a fictional robot in the movie Terminator 2: Judgment Day
  - "T-1000 (H-K)" a song from ‘’Remanufacture – Cloning Technology’’ by Fear Factory, titled after the character above
- Sun Fire T1000, a computer server system
- Telebit T1000, a model of modem
- Toshiba T1000, a laptop computer
- T 1000, a transistor radio manufactured by the German Braun company
- a type of carbon fiber material
