= Les Harris (footballer) =

English footballer

Personal information
- Full name: Leslie Henry Harris
- Date of birth: 29 May 1955 (age 71)
- Place of birth: Stocksbridge, England
- Position: Forward

Senior career*
Years	Team	Apps	(Gls)
1975–1977	Barnsley	26	(2)
- Kiveton Park
- * Club domestic league appearances and goals

Leslie Henry Harris (born 29 May 1955) is an English former footballer who played in the Football League for Barnsley.
