= John Bloor =

British billionaire businessman (born 1943)

John Bloor OBE
- Born: 16 June 1943 (age 83); Derbyshire, England
- Occupation: Businessman
- Title: Owner of Bloor Holdings; Chairman of Bloor Homes; Owner of Triumph Motorcycles Ltd
- Children: 2

John Stuart Bloor OBE (born 16 June 1943) is a British billionaire businessman. His business, Bloor Holdings, owns both Bloor Homes and Triumph Motorcycles.

== Early life ==
Bloor was born in a small Derbyshire village. His father was a coal miner. He suffered from health problems, and long absences from school limited his formal education, leaving school at the age of 15.

== Career ==
Bloor's first job was as a trainee plasterer for a local building contractor. Two years later he set up his own business and began building his first house before he was 20. His building company, Bloor Homes, is now one of the largest privately owned house builders in the UK, and has contributed to the successful regeneration of the East Midlands. In 2002, housing sales reached 1,870 making Bloor Homes then the largest housebuilder to be owned by one man.

While attending the auction of the site of the former Triumph factory to buy the site for house construction, Bloor bought the collapsed Triumph brand in 1983. After sub-licensing the brand for a period, he invested over £80 million into rebuilding the marque, opening the new Hinckley factory in 1991. After a factory fire in 2002 stopped production the factory was rebuilt, and now produces 46,000 motorcycles per annum.

In 2016, Bloor received the Diamond Jubilee Trophy on behalf of all the staff at Triumph Motorcycles. The Trophy has only been given out four times previously.

In 2018, Bloor was paid a £7 million dividend by Bloor Holdings, the company that owns Bloor Homes and Triumph. In 2021, the Sunday Times Rich List estimated his net worth at £1.275 billion.

In February 2026, John Bloor was listed on the Sunday Times Tax list with an estimated £86 million.

== Personal life ==
Bloor lives in Swadlincote, South Derbyshire, England. Due to hip problems he rarely rides motorcycles, preferring a Range Rover. He has two sons, Adrian and Nick. Adrian was chief executive of Bloor Homes until early 2020.

== Political donations ==
J.S. Bloor donated £400,000 to the Conservative Party in the 2017 general election. In the 2019 general election, donations of £750,000 and £200,000 were made to the Conservative Party, and £12,000 to Conservative MP Andrew Bridgen.

== Honours ==
- In 1995 Bloor was awarded the OBE for services to the motorcycle industry
- Honorary Doctor of Laws, University of Leicester

== See also ==
- Triumph Engineering
