= Norton Commando John Player Special =

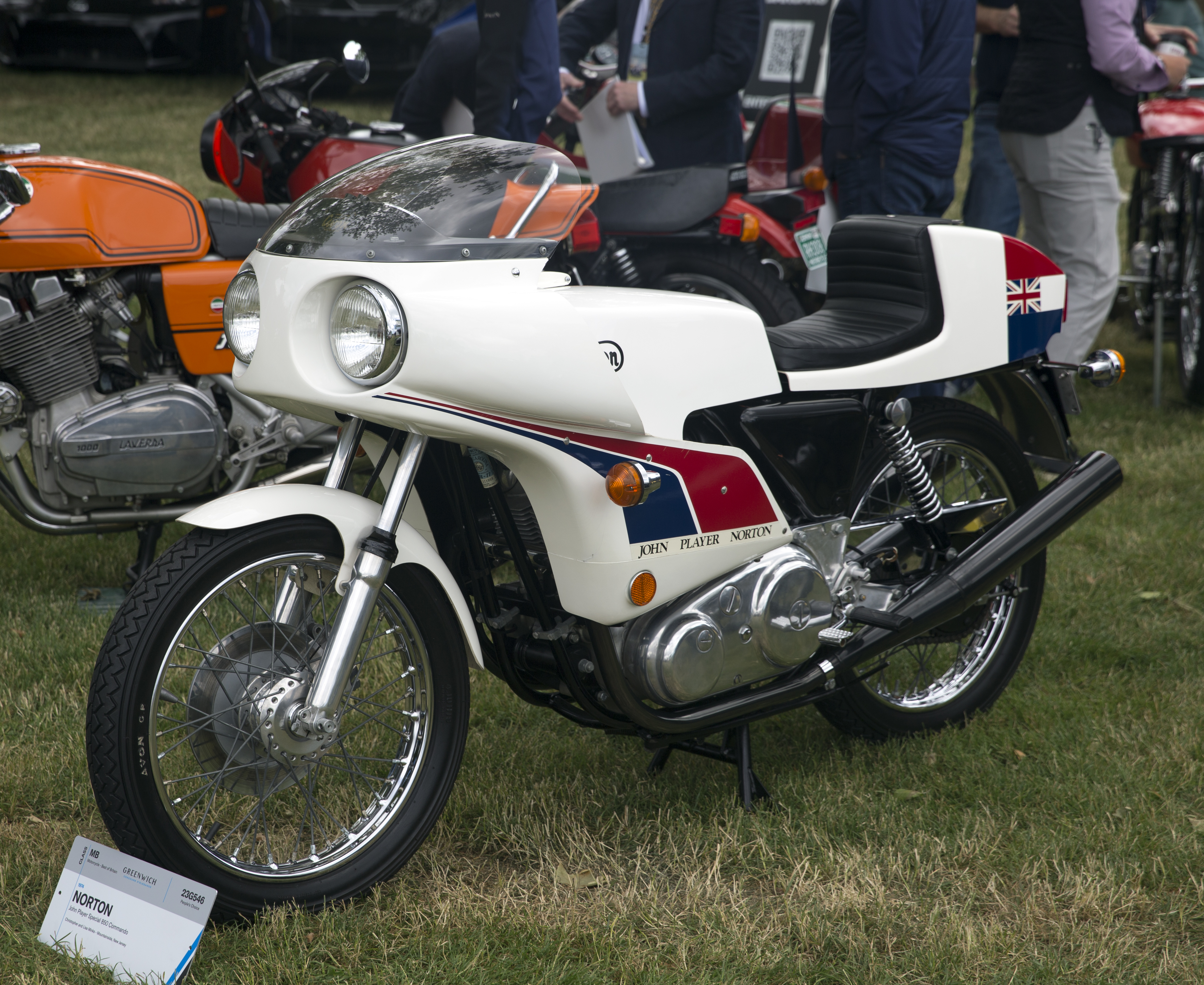
- Norton Commando John Player Special
- Parent company: Norton-Villiers
- Production: 1974
- Engine: 828 cc (50.5 cu in) air-cooled OHV parallel-twin
- Bore / stroke: 77 mm (3.0 in) x 89 mm (3.5 in)
- Compression ratio: 8.5:1
- Top speed: 115 mph (185 km/h) (claimed)
- Power: 60 bhp (45 kW) @ 6,200 rpm
- Transmission: Wet clutch, 4-speed chain drive
- Frame type: Isolastic
- Suspension: Front: Telescopic forks Swinging arm
- Brakes: Front: 10 in (250 mm) disc Rear: 7 in (180 mm) sls drum
- Tyres: Front: 3.50x18 Rear: 4.10x18
- Wheelbase: 57.1 in (1,450 mm)
- Seat height: 31.3 in (800 mm)
- Weight: 435 lb (197 kg) (dry)
- Fuel capacity: 3.5 imp gal (16 L; 4.2 US gal)
- Related: Norton Commando Production Racer

The Norton Commando John Player Special was a 1974 limited-edition version of the Norton Commando that was fitted with bodywork styled to reproduce the successful Formula 750 works racers that were sponsored by cigarette manufacturers John Player & Sons. The machine was based on the Mk2A 850 Commando. Around 200 of these machines were made, of which about 120 were exported to the US. The bike was expensive, selling for around $3,000 in the US, $500 more than a standard Commando.

== Background ==
Dennis Poore, chairman of Norton had instigated the formation of a works racing team to enter Formula 750 events in late 1971 with sponsorship from John Player to promote their John Player Special brand of cigarettes. Design and development engineer Peter Williams, who was also their works rider, was the chief designer of the racers.

The team had some success in 1972 and in 1973, on a newly designed bike, the team won 14 international races. These included three races at the Transatlantic Trophy and the Formula 750cc Isle of Man TT. In British domestic races, Dave Croxford won the British 750 cc Championship and Williams came second in the MCN Superbike Championship.

To capitalise on the success of the race bikes, Norton decided to produce a variant of the Commando styled to resemble the racers.

== Design ==
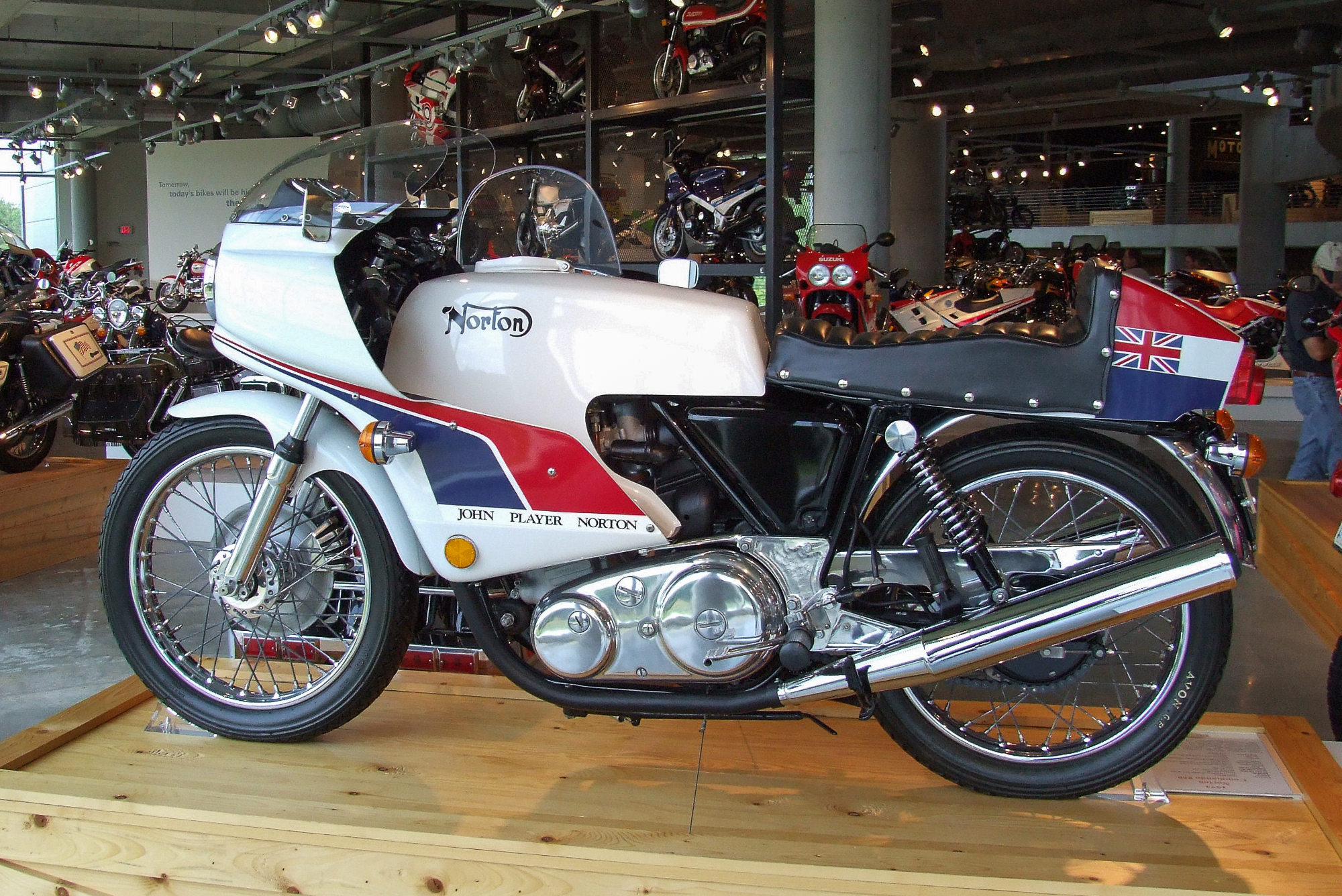
Exhibit at the Barber Vintage Motorsports Museum, Alabama, United States

Norton's stylist/product designer, Mike Oldfield, was given the design responsibility for the bike. Initially it was to have been a cafe racer, but when the works team started entering endurance races with an abbreviated fairing fitted with twin headlights, the design direction changed.

A styling prototype was built from a Mk2A Commando with the bodywork hand-formed out of aluminium and moulds for the fibreglass bodywork made. Fibreglass petrol tanks were illegal at the time so an extended Roadster tank was used with the fibreglass covering it. The single seat had a large hump which had a storage compartment inside. The fairing was made by Avon, who made the fairings for the racers, and was fitted with twin 6 in (150 mm) headlights and swooped down to cover the sides of the engine. Rearsets and clip-on handlebars were fitted and the exhaust finished in black chrome.

== Production ==
Production started in late 1973 and the first bikes were in the dealer's showroom in April 1974. The machines were assembled on the Commando production lines in Andover and Wolverhampton.

Although most of the bikes were fitted with the 850 engine, the Norton catalogue did list the model being available with the short-stroke engine used on the 1974 racer, either in full race tune or detuned for road use. It is not known how many 750s were made.

Norton had planned to produce 1,000 machines but this was optimistic, and only around 200 machines were produced in total with about 120 going to the US.

== Bibliography ==
- Bacon, Roy Hunt (1989). Norton Commando. Niton. ISBN 9780951420430.
- Champion book of motorcycle road racing champions. Studio Publications (Ipswich) Ltd. 1977. ISBN 978-0904584387.
- Cotter, Tom (2012). The Harley in the Barn: More Great Tales of Motorcycles Archaeology. Minneapolis, MN: Motorbooks. ISBN 978-1-61058-658-0.
- Harmon, Paul (31 January 2018). "John Player Norton". retromotoplanet.com.
- Hewitt, Sam (February 2016). "From the Archive: Norton JPN monocoque replica racer". Classic Bike Guide.
- Magrath, Derek (1997) [1991]. Norton the Complete Story. Crowood Classics. Rambsbury: The Crowood Press. ISBN 1-86126-062-8.
- Salvadori, Clement (6 July 2016). "1974 Norton Commando 850 John Player Replica | Rider Magazine". ridermagazine.com.
- Scaysbrook, Jim (12 November 2020). "Norton JPS - White Knight". Old Bike – via PressReader.com.
- Siegal, Margie (2 June 2010). "John Player Norton Commando". Motorcycle Classics.
