= John Player Norton =

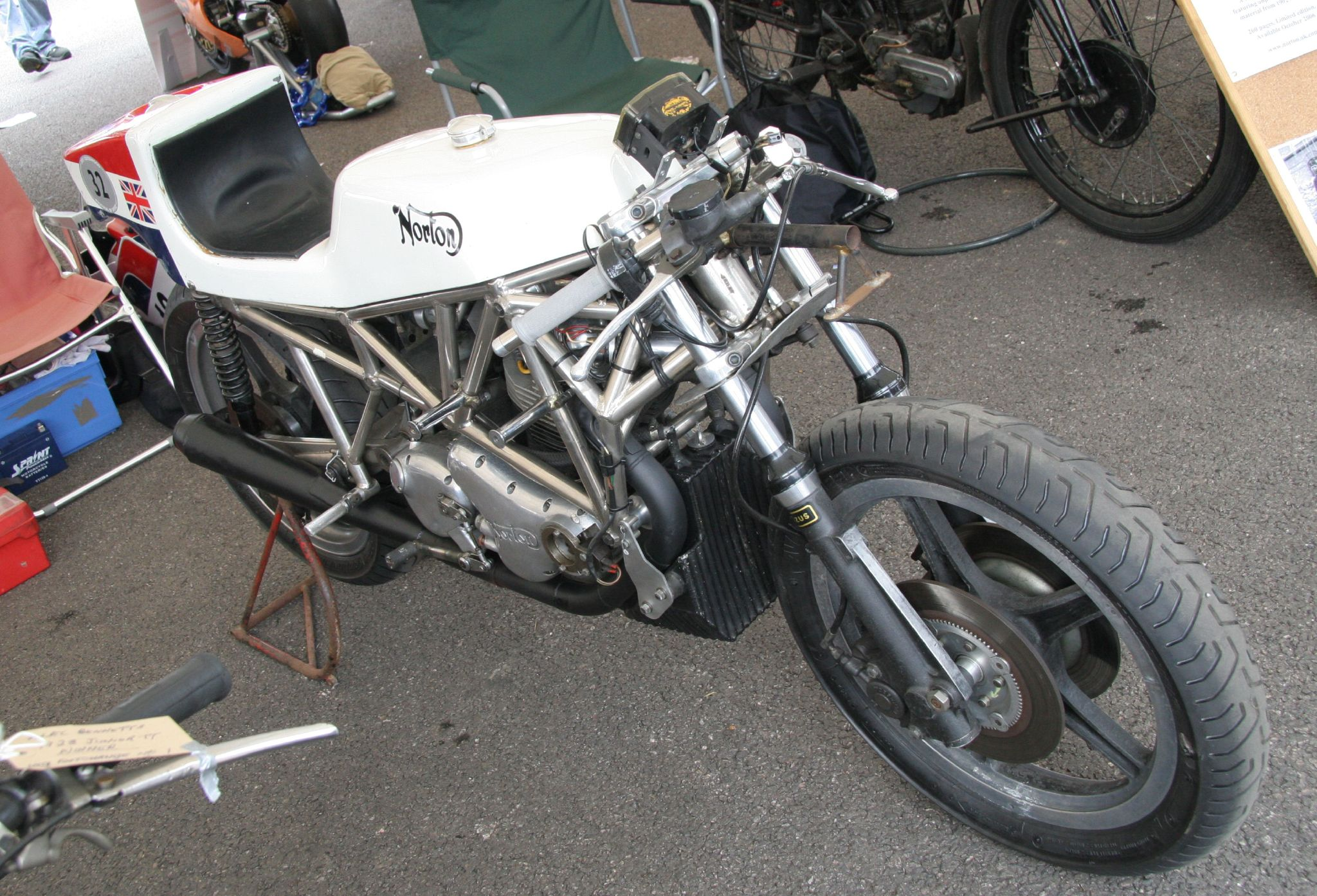
- 1974 Norton F750 'Space frame'
- Manufacturer: Norton Motorcycle Company
- Also called: JPN, JPS Norton
- Parent company: Norton-Villiers/Norton Villiers Triumph
- Production: 1972-1974
- Assembly: Norton Villiers Performance Centre, Thruxton Circuit, Hampshire
- Class: F750 racing motorcycle
- Engine: air-cooled OHV parallel-twin
- Power: 69 bhp (51 kW) - 78 bhp (58 kW)
- Transmission: 5 speed, chain drive

The John Player Norton, also referred to as JPN and JPS Norton, were a series of Formula 750 racers manufactured by Norton Motorcycle Company from 1972 to 1974 and sponsored by cigarette manufacturer John Player. The engine for these machines was derived from the unit used in the Norton Commando, which was a development of the 1948 Bert Hopwood designed 500 cc Dominator. The lack of power from the engine, compared with other manufacturers, led designer and rider Peter Williams to an adopt a radical approach to chassis design. Riders of the bikes included Williams, Phil Read, Tony Rutter, Mick Grant, John Cooper, Dave Aldana and Dave Croxford.

To celebrate the success of the racers, Norton produced a limited-edition version of the Commando, the Norton Commando John Player Special, styled on the racers.

== Background ==
Peter Williams had joined the Norton factory's new race shop in 1970 as a design and development engineer as well as racing for the factory. In 1971 Williams was given a budget by Dennis Poore, chairman of Norton, to build a one-off Formula 750 prototype. The prototype performed well enough to convince Poore of the potential to use racing to promote the Norton brand. With sponsorship from John Player to promote their John Player No 10 brand of cigarettes the John Player Norton racing team was set up in November 1971. Current 250cc world champion Phil Read was recruited to the team, as was former Suzuki GP rider Frank Perris to act as team manager.

== History ==
=== 1972 ===
1972 JPN
- Engine: 745 cc (45.5 cu in) air-cooled OHV parallel-twin
- Bore / stroke: 73 mm (2.9 in) x 89 mm (3.5 in)
- Top speed: 153 mph (246 km/h)
- Power: 69 bhp (51 kW) - 76 bhp (57 kW)
- Transmission: 5 speed, chain drive
- Frame type: Double cradle
- Brakes: twin 10" discs (front); 8" drum (rear)
- Wheelbase: 1,390 mm (55 in)
- Weight: 365 lb (166 kg) (dry)

Compared to other makes, the Norton engine was down on power so Williams' design tried to offset this by reducing frontal area and improving roadholding. The Isolastic engine mounting system was retained but a more compact version of the Commando frame was built. To keep the centre of gravity low and to allow the rider to tuck in behind the fairing screen better, drop pannier tanks were used. The concept of drop pannier tanks was not new. Norton had used them on an experimental version of the Manx, the 1960 350cc 40M "Lowboy". More recently, Dunstall had used pannier tanks on their 1969 750 Norton racers, setting a lap record at Crystal Palace on Easter Monday and winning the 1,000 cc race at Thruxton in April in the hands of Percy Tait. The low position of the fuel tanks required the fuel to be pumped up to a small header tank to feed the two 32 mm Amal Concentric carbs by a mechanical pump operated by the swinging arm. Starting required the bike to be bumped up and down to prime the header tank. The fairing for the bike was developed in the MIRA wind tunnel. Brakes were twin discs on the front, the right calliper was mounted in front of the fork leg and the left one behind as the same fork leg was used on both sides. Rear brake was a Commando 8" drum.

The engine was developed throughout the season and output went from 69 bhp to 76 bhp at 7,500 rpm by the end of the season.

From the formation of the team to the first race, the Daytona 200, was only ten weeks, so the team had to work long hours to get two bikes ready for the race. Two bikes were ready for Daytona, one for Williams and the other for Read, finished in the blue and white colours of John Player. During practice the bikes started overheating, so as a quick-fix, an oil cooler from a Chevrolet Corvair was fitted. Read finished fourth and Williams retired with a gearbox failure.

Whilst the team were at Daytona, the race shop completed a third bike for Tony Rutter ahead of the Easter Transatlantic Trophy. Read was the British captain at the Transatlantic Trophy, scoring a third place at one of the Brands Hatch races, and Williams finished third in the other.

All three of the works motorcycles retired during the Formula 750cc IOM TT.

Mick Grant led a procession of John Player Nortons to victory at Scarborough and Read won the British season's finale at Brands' Race of the South.

Five of these models were made, one of which is now in the National Motorcycle Museum. Three of the models went to Spain when they were disposed of by the factory and raced in Spanish F750 under the PDN banner, sponsored by the vintners Pedro Domecq.

=== 1973: Monocoque ===
1973 JPN Monocoque
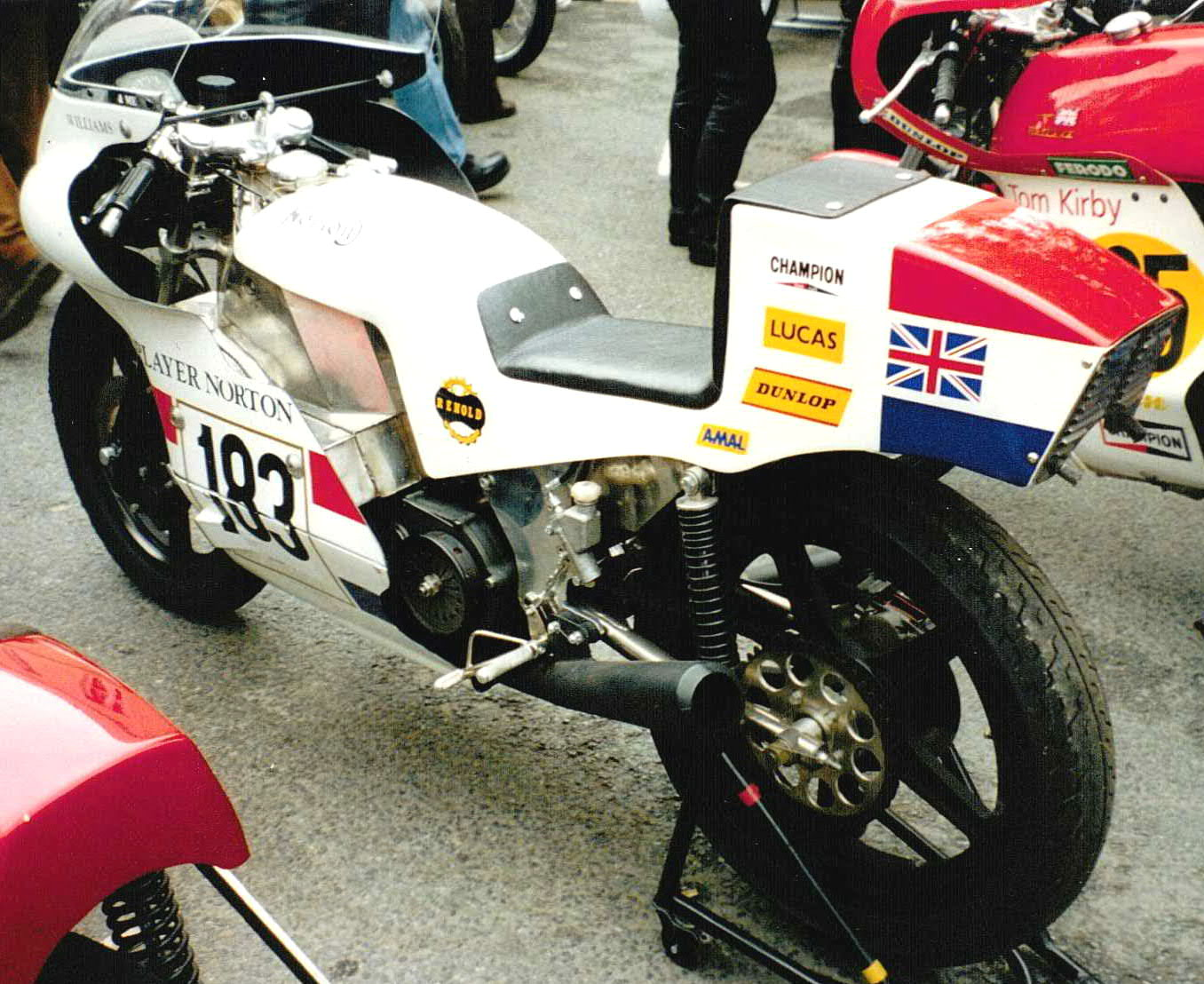
- 1973 Norton Monocoque displayed at Castletown, Isle of Man in 1999
- Engine: 745 cc (45.5 cu in) air-cooled OHV parallel-twin
- Bore / stroke: 73 mm (2.9 in) x 89 mm (3.5 in)
- Compression ratio: 10.5:1
- Top speed: 160 mph (260 km/h)
- Power: 76 bhp (57 kW) @ 7,200 rpm
- Transmission: Dry clutch, 5 speed, chain drive
- Frame type: Stainless steel semi-monocoque
- Brakes: Front: twin 10" discs Rear: single 8½" disc
- Rake, trail: 27°, 98 mm (3.9 in)
- Wheelbase: 1,420 mm (56 in)
- Weight: 340 lb (150 kg) (dry)

The '72 bike had been a stopgap to get the team racing. Williams took a more radical approach for the 1973 model to make up for the deficiency in power of the pushrod twin. The new bike was to have a semi-monocoque chassis with a small frontal area and low centre of gravity by carrying the oil and fuel as low as possible. The chassis was stiffer than the '72 bike's tubular frame and the engine moved back by 1" to improve traction. The isolastic engine mounting system was retained.

The double-skin monocoque was fabricated from 600 individual pieces of 22 gauge stainless steel hand welded together and weighed 37 lb (17 kg). It contained the fuel and oil tanks and was shaped to duct cooling air to the engine and also to provide a ram-air effect airbox for the carburettors. Fabrication of the prototype started in October 1972. Because the fuel was stored low in the monocoque, a mechanical pump was needed to raise the fuel to a header tank.

Front forks used stanchions and yokes from the AJS motocross machines with new cast magnesium legs. To reduced unsprung weight, the cast iron front brake discs, activated by Lockheed twin-piston callipers, were reduced to 10" and an 18" cast magnesium 5 spoke front wheel fitted. A single 8½" disc and cast wheel were fitted to the rear.

A Peel-type fairing incorporating handlebar blisters and seat tailpiece were developed in the MIRA wind tunnel and the drag coefficient was reduced to 0.39. A moulded one-piece top cover for the engine/monocoque, the seat and the tailpiece was used. Livery was changed from the previous year's blue and white to the iconic red, white and blue.

A 77 x 80 mm "short stroke" version of the engine was planned to be used, but this was still in development so the existing 73 x 89 mm "long stroke" engine was retained. High compression 10.5:1 Omega pistons were fitted, the crank lightened and head reworked. A 3S cam was used with steel pushrods. Larger 33 mm Amal Concentric carburettors were fitted and the engine produced 76 bhp (57 kW) at 7,200 rpm.

To overcome the previous transmission failures, a redesigned primary drive was used. An extra outrigger bearing and a crankshaft located shock absorber were fitted along with a dry clutch. Primary drive sprockets were changed to make the gearbox run 25% faster thereby reducing the torque on the gear teeth. The gears were also redesigned.

Only three bikes were constructed plus a prototype. One bike was ready for Williams to ride in the 1973 Daytona 200 but retired with carburetion problems. At the Easter Transatlantic Trophy races, John Cooper and Williams were in the British team with Williams ending the series as the top points scorer by claiming three victories along with a second place and third place results.

At the second round held at Mallory Park, Williams, riding the slower but better handling Norton battled for the lead with Yvon Duhamel, riding the faster Japanese three-cylinder two-stroke engined Kawasaki H2R. Three laps from the end, Duhamel's motorcycle developed a stiff throttle, allowing Williams to take the victory. DuHamel came back to win the second race over second-placed Williams. Cooper crashed his 350 Yamsel in a support race at Mallory Park and Dave Croxford took his place in the Mallory Trophy races.

At the third round at Oulton Park, Williams claimed the first race victory after early leader, Art Baumann's Kawasaki developed transmission troubles. In the second race, Williams was able to overtake Kawasaki teammates Gary Nixon and Duhamel to claim his third victory of the series. Williams tied Duhamel as the highest individual points scorers, both with 84 points.

Williams won the Formula 750cc TT with Mick Grant second, both on monocoques. At the Imola 200 two weeks after the Isle of Man TT, Williams crashed and damaged the bike extensively. The bike was rebuilt some years later and passed into private hands.

In the MCN Superbike Championship Williams tied on points with Suzuki's Barry Sheene, but the title went to Sheene as he had won one more race. Dave Croxford won the British 750 cc Championship on the Norton that year. At the British round of the 1973 Formula 750 season held at the fast and flowing Silverstone Circuit, Williams demonstrated the prowess of his designing skills as he led the race against the far more powerful Japanese two-stroke motorcycles, only to run out of petrol one lap from the end of the race.

Endurance races were also entered and for these the monocoque was fitted with an abbreviated fairing fitted with twin headlights.

At the final road race of the AMA season, Ontario, California, Williams' bike developed a fuel leak from the monocoque and he had to withdraw from the race. Team-mate Dave Aldana retired after a few laps with engine problems. Aldana continued to use the monocoque for the 1974 Daytona 200 and Transatlantic Trophy races. The bike was returned to America after the Trophy races and stored by the Norton importers until 1977 when it passed into private hands.

In total the monocoque won 14 international races in 1973.

==== Reproductions ====
In 2013 Williams started a project to manufacture reproductions of the 1973 monocoque racer. The prototype in the National Motorcycle Museum (UK) and one of the racers now owned by Mike Braid, were used to obtain the correct dimensions and specification. The first production bike was started in March 2014 and delivered to the customer in February of the following year. The price of the bike in 2016 was £74,000. Production was limited to 25 machines however, only four of the replicas were built before Williams became ill and the project foundered. Williams passed away in 2020.

=== 1974: Space frame ===
1974 JPN Space frame
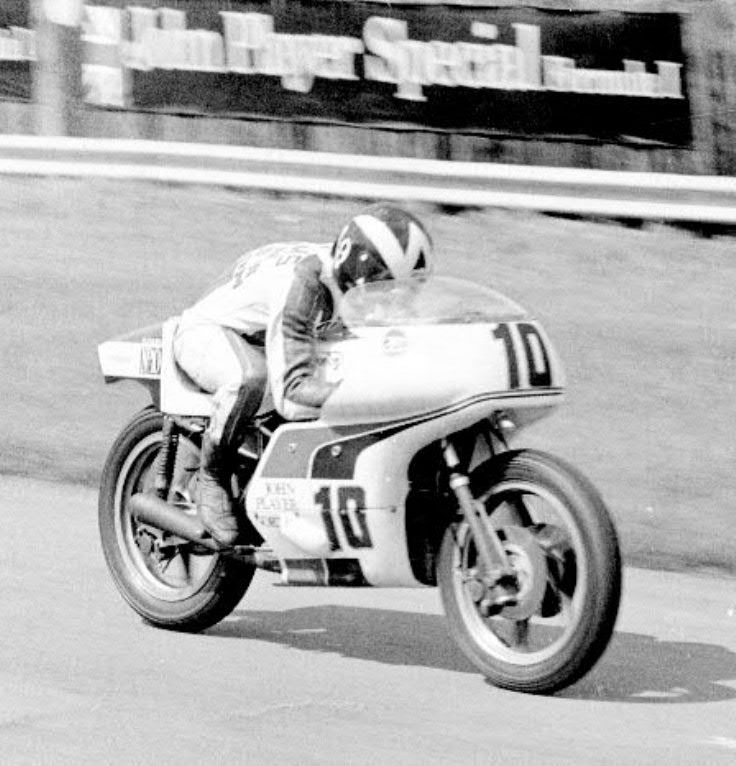
- Peter Williams on a 1974 JPN Space frame
- Engine: 749 cc (45.7 cu in) air-cooled OHV parallel-twin
- Bore / stroke: 77 mm (3.0 in) x 80.4 mm (3.17 in)
- Compression ratio: 10.5:1
- Top speed: 165 mph (266 km/h)
- Power: 78 bhp (58 kW) @ 7,500 rpm
- Transmission: Dry clutch, 5 speed, chain drive
- Frame type: Space frame
- Brakes: Front: twin 10.5" discs Rear: single 8.5" disc
- Wheelbase: 1,410 mm (56 in)
- Weight: 331 lb (150 kg) (dry)

The 1974 model was built with a compact space frame to keep the frontal area as small as possible and was again fitted with an all-enveloping peel-style fairing. The Isolastic engine mounts were retained. Williams later claimed that the decision to make a new frame rather than develop the monocoque was a political decision. The mechanics preferred the space frame bike as the engine was more accessible and easier to work on.

The front brake was improved with Lockheed two-piston callipers acting on twin 10.5 in Norvil cast iron discs. Four of the space frame bikes were made, plus a prototype that had a different frame.

At the 1974 season opener held at the Daytona Speedway, Williams finished 10th and was the top-placing four-stroke motorcycle. Williams and Croxford were both in the British team for the Transatlantic Trophy races a few weeks later. Williams and Croxford competed at a number of European races such as Imola and Spa, where Williams won.

At the John Player meeting at Silverstone in August, Williams tried a prototype frame with monoshock rear suspension. This had been intended to house the Cosworth engine, but as this was not yet ready the Commando-derived engine was fitted. Both Williams and Croxford, on a 'regular' spaceframe, retired during the race.

Later in August at Oulton Park, Williams had a major accident when the combined seat and tank unit became detached from the bike. The accident ended Williams racing career.

Dave Croxford was placed 5th in the 1974 Mallory Park Race of the Year.

The bike that Williams won on at Spa was passed on to the Benelux Norton importer, Podevyn, and was used in local F750 races.

The factory disposed of the bikes at the end of the season. Using one of the space frame bikes, Benjamin Grau, under the PDN banner, won all four rounds of the 1975 Spanish F750 Championship.

=== End of production ===
The Commando-based engine was no longer competitive against the Japanese two strokes. Although Norton had commissioned Cosworth to build a new engine based on their DFV Formula 1 engine, this was still being developed. The John Player sponsorship had been for 3 years. As Norton's parent company at the time, Norton Villiers Triumph, were experiencing financial difficulties, the racing programme was cut back. The sponsorship deal with John Player wasn't renewed.

== National Motorcycle Museum ==
Two JPS Nortons were displayed at the British National Motorcycle Museum in Birmingham, a 1972 pannier tank and a 1973 monocoque. On 16 September 2003 the buildings were engulfed in fire and 600 motorcycles were destroyed or damaged. Museum owner Roy Richards commissioned former JPN development engineer Norman White, who ran a Norton engineering workshop at Thruxton, to restore the two machines and also a Cosworth Norton and a Commando production racer. White assembled a restoration team consisting of members of the original JPN race team: race shop foreman John McLaren, mechanic Peter Pyket, and draftsman Basil Knight. White's team got the four bikes ready for the planned re-opening of the museum in October 2004. Richards was so pleased with the quality of work that the machines were placed in the museum's foyer. Richards subsequently commissioned White to build 5 further machines including a second 1972 pannier tank and a 1974 spaceframe.

== Norton Commando John Player Special ==
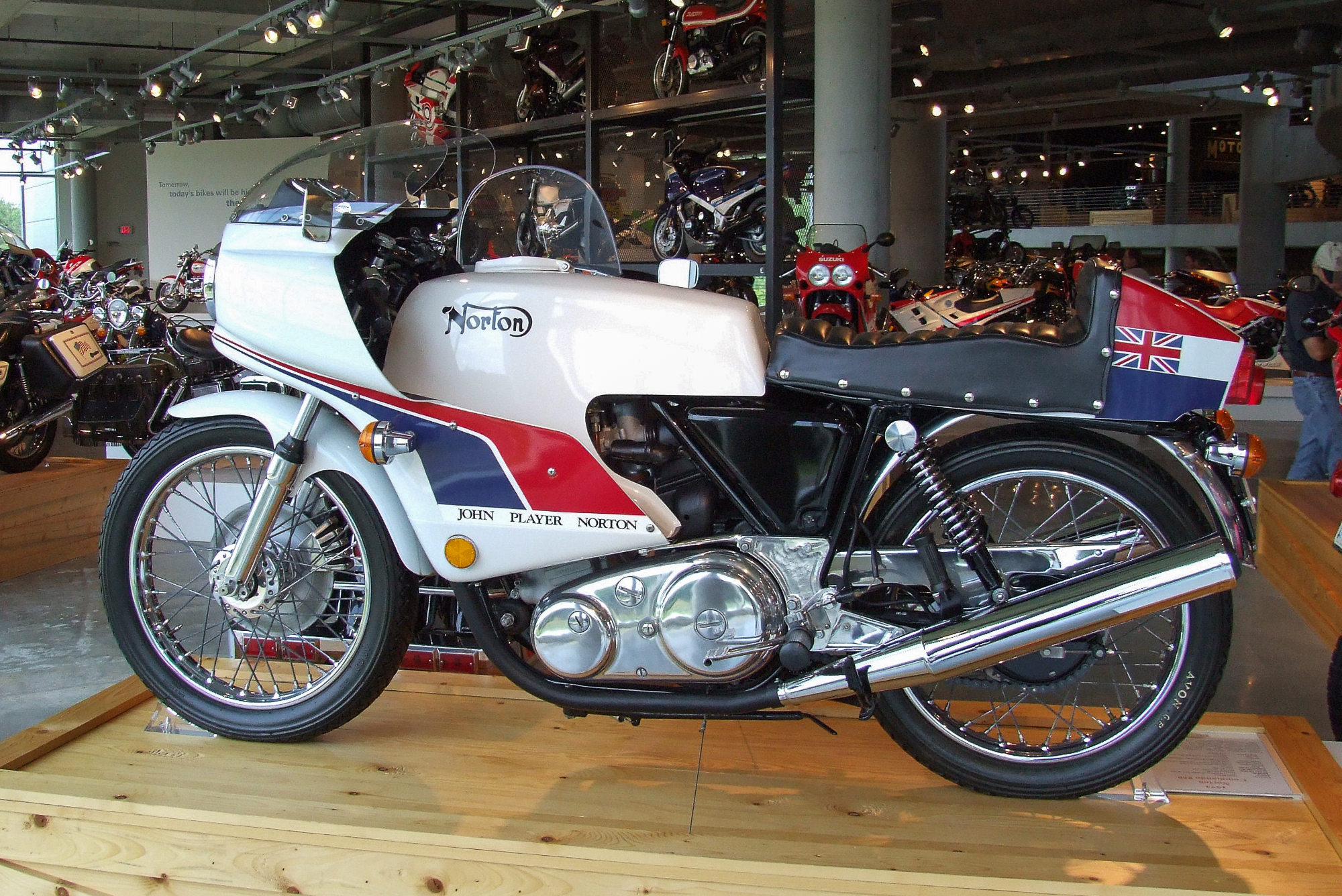
Exhibit at the Barber Vintage Motorsports Museum, Alabama, United States

To capitalise on its racing successes, Norton started designing a variant of the Commando styled to look like the John Player racers. Based on the Mark2A 850 Commando, the machines were fitted with an endurance style fairing with twin headlights, rearset footrests, a fibreglass dummy tank that fitted over an extended standard steel fuel tank and a single racing seat with a large hump. The exhausts were finished in black chrome. Production started in April 1974, and around 200 of this model were made, over half of which went to the US.

== Bibliography ==
- Aynsley, Phil (25 December 2018). "1973 Norton 750 Monocoque". MCNews.
- Aynsley, Phil (4 April 2019). "1974 Norton 750 Space Frame | John Player Special". MCNews.
- Bacon, Roy Hunt (1989). Norton Commando. Niton. ISBN 9780951420430.
- Cathcart, Alan (March 1996). "Gentleman And Players" (PDF). British Bike Magazine. pp. 34–38 – via davestestsandarticles.weebly.com.
- Cathcart, Alan (September–October 2008). "John Player Norton Monocoque". Moto Tech – via www.accessnorton.com.
- Cathcart, Alan (July–August 2010). "1973 John Player Norton Monocoque". Motorcycle Classics.
- Cathcart, Alan (May–June 2016). "The Way Ahead: John Player Norton Monocoque Replica Racer". Motorcycle Classics.
- Cathcart, Alan (9 February 2018). "1974 John Player Norton Spaceframe racer test: Last of the Line". DriveMag Riders.
- Cathcart, Alan (January–February 2019). "Lowboy Racer: 1960 Norton 350cc 40M". Motorcycle Classics.
- Champion book of motorcycle road racing champions. Studio Publications (Ipswich) Ltd. 1977. ISBN 978-0904584387.
- Cooper, Hamish (22 October 2019). "The Approachable Nortons". Motorcycle Classics.
- Cotter, Tom (2012). The Harley in the Barn: More Great Tales of Motorcycles Archaeology. Minneapolis, MN: Motorbooks. ISBN 978-1-61058-658-0.
- Crawford, Pete (18 August 2020). "Dave Croxford". Classic Racer – via PressReader.com.
- Harmon, Paul (31 January 2018). "John Player Norton". retromotoplanet.com.
- Hewitt, Sam (February 2016). "From the Archive: Norton JPN monocoque replica racer". Classic Bike Guide.
- Magrath, Derek (1997) [1991]. Norton the Complete Story. Crowood Classics. Rambsbury: The Crowood Press. ISBN 1-86126-062-8.
- Moses, Sam (December 1973). "The Last Tango in Ontario" (PDF). Cycle Guide – via badcurator.org.
- Oxley, Mat (24 April 2020). "'You'd have a couple of pints, then go and race': talking with Dave Croxford". Motor Sport Magazine.
- Salvadori, Clement (6 July 2016). "1974 Norton Commando 850 John Player Replica". Rider Magazine.
- Scaysbrook, Jim (12 November 2020). "Norton JPS - White Knight". Old Bike – via PressReader.com.
- Siegal, Margie (2 June 2010). "John Player Norton Commando". Motorcycle Classics.
- Swift, Jim (1976). Ride it! : the complete book of big bike racing. Yeovil: Foulis. ISBN 978-0-85429-220-2.
- Williams, Peter (2012). Peter Williams Designed To Race. Brooklands Books. ISBN 978-1-85520-956-5.
- Woollett, Mick (2004). Norton : the complete illustrated history. St. Paul, Minn.: Motorbooks International. ISBN 978-0-7603-1984-0.
