= Norton Challenge P86 =

Type of motorcycle

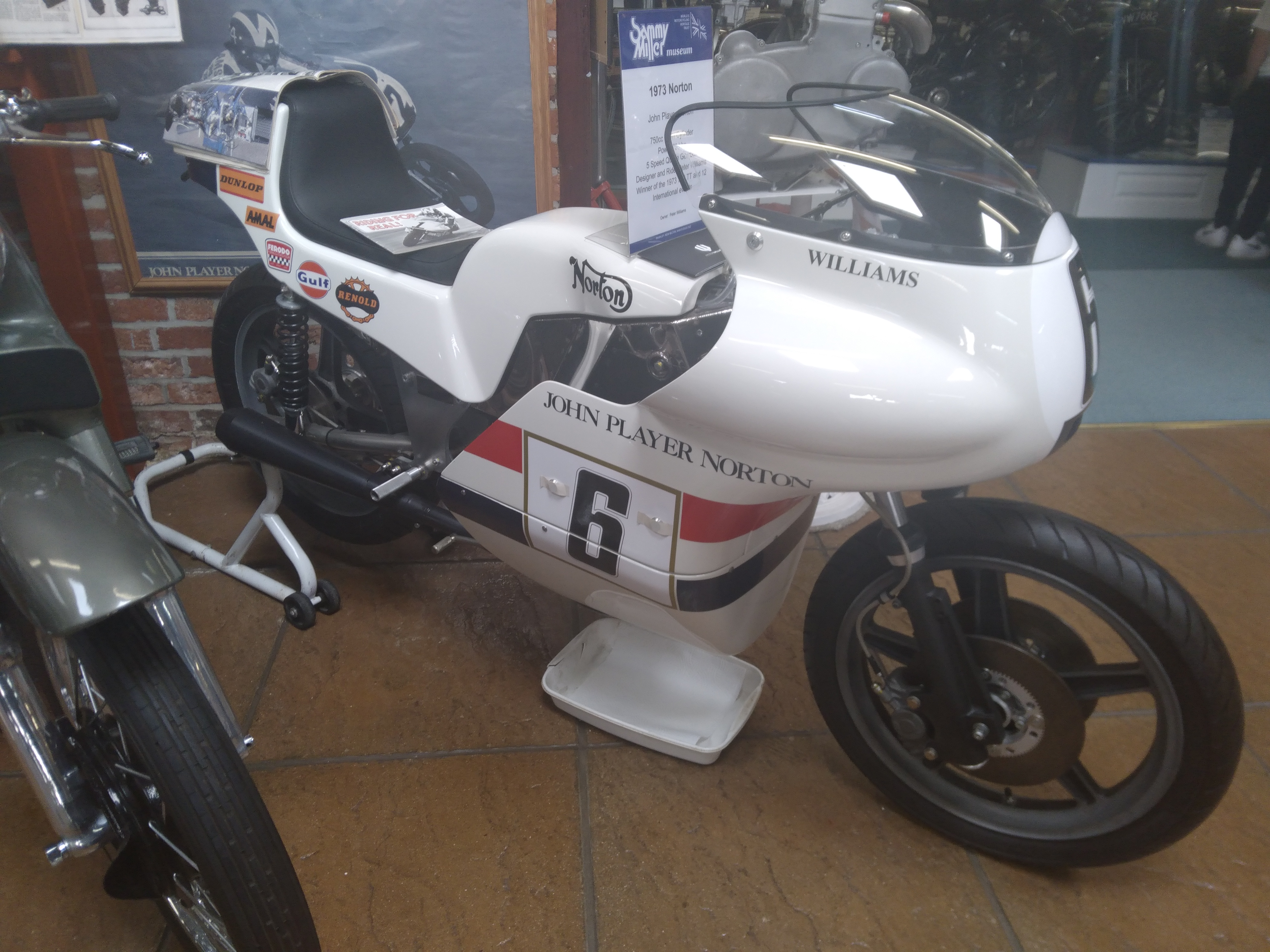
- Norton Challenge P86
- Manufacturer: Norton Motorcycle Company
- Also called: Norton Cosworth
- Parent company: NVT
- Class: Racing motorcycle
- Engine: Cosworth 748 cc (45.6 cu in) DOHC, four-valves per cylinder, water cooled parallel twin
- Bore / stroke: 85.67 mm × 64.9 mm (3.373 in × 2.555 in)
- Power: 95 bhp (71 kW) @ 9,750 rpm
- Ignition type: Lucas RITA CDI
- Frame type: Stressed engine member
- Suspension: Front: telescopic forks Rear: swinging arm with twin shocks
- Brakes: Front: Twin discs Rear: Single disc

The Norton Challenge P86, also known as the Norton Cosworth, is a racing motorcycle designed in 1973 by Keith Duckworth of Cosworth Engineering for Norton Motorcycles. The 750 cc (46 cu in) DOHC vertical twin was essentially two cylinders from Cosworth's world championship winning V8 DFV Formula One engine. A road going version was intended to be a replacement for the Norton Commando. Four complete machines and around 30 engines were made before the project was cancelled due to the financial collapse of NVT.

== Background ==
By 1973 the British motorcycle manufacturing industry was in trouble, no longer able to compete in world markets with mass-produced, more technologically advanced models from the Japanese Big Four. (Note: Honda, Suzuki, Yamaha and Kawasaki) Many famous brands were no more. Following a collapse of the BSA group's shares on the stock market, BSA, along with its subsidiary Triumph, were merged with Norton Villiers to form Norton Villiers Triumph (NVT). (Note: BSA shareholders received £10m for the company, of this £4.8m came from the British Government and the remainder from Norton Villiers parent company Manganese Bronze Holdings. BSA's non-motorcycle interests, most notably Carbodies, manufacturer of the London 'Black Cab' were taken over by Manganese Bronze) However, the merged company was underfunded. Norton's vertical twin engine that powered the Commando had reached the limit of its development for both road and track by the early 1970s. The engine design could be traced back to Bert Hopwood's 1947 497 cc (30.3 cu in) Norton Model 7 twin. A new unit construction engine with a five speed gearbox was needed, but Norton could not afford to develop one themselves.

Two British Formula 1 engine manufacturers were approached: BRM, who had a 3 litre v12 from which a 750 cc triple could be built and Cosworth whose dominant V8 could be the basis for a 750 cc twin. Cosworth were chosen for the contract. This was initially to design the 'top end' of the engine but soon changed to Cosworth designing the whole engine/gearbox unit. NVT chairman Dennis Poore felt this would not only save time but would add interest and credibility to the new bike.

== History ==
The Challenge finally made its debut at Brands Hatch in October 1975 ridden by Dave Croxford. In the Saturday heat Croxford was involved in a ten bike crash at the first corner. Croxford was injured in the crash and Alex George rode the bike in the Sunday race. The bike's cooling system had been damaged in the previous day's crash and the bike was retired.

At the end of the 1975 season Victor Palomo tested the Challenge at Silverstone on behalf of the Spanish Norton importer JA Rodes with the intention of using the bike for F750. Unfortunately Norton's financial situation prevented the factory supporting the project. It also declined a request, sponsored by the RFME (Real Federación Motociclista Española), to supply the Venezuelan Venemotos team.

In April 1976, Croxford and the Challenge were part of the British Transatlantic Trophy team. After performing poorly in the first round at Brands Hatch, the bike was withdrawn from the rest of the series. In June of that year the bike, again ridden by Croxford, retired on the first lap of the Isle of Man Classic TT. Shortly after, NVT went into liquidation and the project was cancelled.

Croxford was never able to achieve lap times on the Challenge that he had previously managed on the Commando engined John Player Nortons.

=== P89 ===
At the NVT liquidation sale, a machine with a water cooled, pre-unit DOHC engine in Commando running gear was put up for sale. The machine had primary and final drives on the right hand side, and used a reversed Norton gearbox. A plate marked P89 was attached to the bike. This bike may have been a test-bed for the Cosworth technology or possibly a prototype interim model between the Commando and Challenge to reduce initial tooling costs. A second similar engine fitted with a single SU carburettor was also offered for sale.

== Sutherland machines ==
Two of the four bikes made went to the US, the remaining two stayed in the UK until sold to a German entrepreneur along with numerous parts. The German then sold Scottish Norton enthusiast Ian Sutherland two engines and enough cycle parts to build a complete bike. Southerland commissioned ex-Norton factory race mechanic Norman White to assemble a Challenge from the parts. The engine was built up by ex-Cosworth engineer Bob Osborne. The bike was given the chassis number 003 and was run-in on public country road near Sutherland's home. It was given two 20 minutes demonstration runs at the August 1981 Donington Park 50th Anniversary meeting by Scottish racer Jock Findlay and racing journalist Alan Cathcart.

The second engine was built up into a Battle of the Twins racer using a Harris frame. Rider Rob Sewell achieved a near 100 mph lap at the 1985 Isle of Man Senior TT.

A second Challenge was built for Sutherland by ex-JPN lead fabricator John McLaren out of spares purchased by Sutherland when the NVT race team was liquidated. Both the headstock and engine were stamped JAB004.

== Quantel Cosworth ==
In 1980 Cosworth was taken over by United Engineering Industries (UEI). In July 1984, newly appointed Cosworth director, Bob Graves (Note: Arthur 'Bob' Graves was a former Formula 3, air and motorcycle racer and co-founder of electronics company Quantel which had recently joined UEI and was influential within the group.) was being shown around the Cosworth factory by Keith Duckworth and spotted some twin cylinder engines in a storeroom. Duckworth explained these were from the Norton project and added that "You're looking at the only engine we have ever built which has never won a race". Duckworth allowed Graves to have two of the engines on the proviso that Graves expected no support from Cosworth for them.

Graves intended to build a Battle of the Twins (Note: With multi-cylinder machines dominating the Superbike Championship, the AMA set up a series for twin-cylinder machines up to 1,000 cc (61 cu in), the Battle of the twins. A demonstration event was run during the 1981 Daytona Week with a full series starting the next year. Similar series were later set up in other countries.) racer using the engine and asked F1 and Motorcycle GP world champion John Surtees to become involved in the project. Surtees became technical advisor, team manager and at times engine tuner.

Surtees asked Exactweld to create the front and rear subframes for the bike. Exactweld partners Guy Pearson and John Baldwin had previously worked for Surtees' F1 Team fabricating monocoques. They also had experience designing and building motorcycle chassis, their Exactweld 250 racer having taken the 1984 European 250cc Championship in the hands of rider Gary Noel. (Note: 12 Yamaha TZ 250 engined Exactweld 250s were built using a perforated stainless steel spine frame. The bikes were over 10 kg (22 lb) lighter than the standard TZ250 racers and were the first 250 GP bikes that needed to carry ballast to meet the 90 kg (200 lb) minimum weight limit.) Exactweld created a triangular front subframe out of 0.25 in (6.4 mm) duralumin with the steering head at the front and bolting onto all four sides of the cylinder head at the rear. At the rear they fitted a triangulated monoshock swinging arm that pivoted on the gearbox casing. A single, near-horizontal White Power shock absorber ran from the top of the swinging arm to the rear of the front subframe.

Duckworth suggested that Ilmor Engineering (Note: Following discussions with Indycar team owner Roger Penske, engineers Paul Morgan and Mario Illien had left Cosworth's employ and formed Ilmor Engineering in January 1984 to develop a new Indycar engine. Penske, and from October 1984, Chevrolet provided financial backing for the project. Morgan was one of the engineers involved in the development of the original Norton Cosworth engine.) should carry out further development work on the engine, although Duckworth still offered advice on problems with the engine. Ilmor increased the capacity to 825 cc (50.3 cu in) by using 90 mm (3.5 in) pistons. They also modified the cylinder head, crankshaft, primary drive, clutch and gearbox. Forth and fifth gear were made closer together.

The bike was developed in English club races in the later part of the 1985 season and entered into the 1986 Daytona AMA BOTT race. Australian Gary Flood was brought in to act as team mechanic and fellow Australian Paul Lewis to ride the machine. The engine was fitted with 11.7:1 pistons, 40 mm (1.6 in) Amal Mk 2 Concentric carbs with remote floats and Motoplat ignition. It was producing 105 bhp (78 kW) at 10,500 rpm. Lewis qualified 8th on the grid and the race developed into a 3-way battle between Lewis and the works Ducatis of Marco Lucchinelli and Jimmy Adamo. Lucchinelli eventually won the race with Lewis finishing second.

Returning to Daytona for 1987, Australian Rob Phillis rode the bike. Motec electronic fuel injection had been fitted. Phillis retired during the race due to technical issues.

For 1988 the bike was fitted with an experimental mechanical fuel injection developed by Cosworth and produced 120 bhp (89 kW) at 10,500 rpm. Graves asked Surtees to find a British rider and Roger Marshall was signed up. At Daytona Marshall defeated Stefano Caracchi on the works Ducati 851 after a hard-fought battle. Marshall went on to win Battle of the Twins races at Spa and Assen later that year. Having achieved his objective of winning with the bike and having spent £100,0000 of his own money on the project, Graves retired the bike at the end of the year.

In 1995 it was reported that Triumph Motorcycles Ltd were considering producing a 750 Bonneville sports bike using a trellis frame and the Cosworth twin engine as developed for the Quantel.

== National Motorcycle Museum ==
Two Challenges were displayed at the British National Motorcycle Museum in Birmingham. On 16 September 2003 the buildings were engulfed in fire and 600 motorcycles were destroyed or damaged. Museum owner Roy Richards commissioned former JPN development engineer Norman White, who ran a Norton engineering workshop at Thruxton, to restore the Challenge and also two John Player Nortons and a Commando production racer. White assembled a restoration team consisting of members of the original JPN race team: race shop foreman John McLaren, mechanic Peter Pyket, and draftsman Basil Knight. White's team got the four bikes ready and fully running for the planned re-opening of the museum in October 2004. (Note: Although planned for October 2004, the museum reopening was delayed to 1 December.) Richards was so pleased with the quality of work that the machines were placed in the museum's foyer. Richards subsequently commissioned White to build five further racing Nortons including a Challenge, although this Challenge may have been for display purposes only and without engine internals.

== Technical details ==
=== Cycle parts ===
The Challenge used the engine as a fully-stressed frame member. A tubular sub-frame was mounted on the cambox to mount the leading-axle front forks. The cast-aluminium, twin-shock swinging arm pivoted on the gearbox casting.

One of the two factory development bikes was fitted with experimental leading-link forks but these were never tested.

== Notes and references ==
=== Bibliography ===
- Avossa, Fabio (16 October 2019). "La Quantel Cosworth: dal fallimento Norton al trionfo di Daytona" [The Quantel Cosworth: from Norton failure to Daytona triumph]. ItaliaOnRoad - Rivista Italia Motori (in Italian).
- Aynsley, Phil (21 March 2018). "The Norton Challenge P86 | Cosworth 746cc Twin". MCNews.
- Bacon, Roy H. (1989). Norton Commando, All Models. Niton Publishing. ISBN 9780951420430.
- Bacon, Roy H. (1995). Norton twins : the postwar 500, 600, 650, 750, 850 and lightweight twins. Ventnor: Niton. ISBN 978-1-85579-030-8. quoted in Robson, Graham (2017). Cosworth : the search for power (Sixth ed.). Dorchester: Veloce Publishing. p. 76. ISBN 978-1-84584-895-8.
- Branch, Ben (25 December 2020). "The Norton Challenge P86 – The Bike That Could Have Saved The British Motorcycle Industry". Silodrome.
- Burr, Norman (15 June 2015). First Principles: The Official Biography of Keith Duckworth. Dorchester, England: Veloce Publishing Ltd. ISBN 978-1-84584-528-5.
- Cameron, Kevin (12 November 2009). Top Dead Center 2: Racing and Wrenching with Cycle World's Kevin Cameron. Minneapolis: Motorbooks. ISBN 978-0-7603-3608-3.
- Cathcart, Alan (December 1981). "Classic Bike". quoted in "Offered from the National Motorcycle Museum Collection, 1975 Norton-Cosworth Challenge P86 750cc Racing Motorcycle Frame no. JN 1 Engine no. none visible". Bonhams.
- Cathcart, Alan (2 August 2017). "EXACTWELD TZ250 Racer test: Against All Odds". DriveMag Riders.
- Cathcart, Alan (March 1995). "Triumph's One-Two Punch?". Cycle World: 30.
- Cathcart, Alan (15 Jun 2021). "Yamaha TRX850R". Classic Racer – via PressReader.com.
- Clayton, Graham (May–June 2020). "The Quantel Cosworth BOTT GP Twin" (PDF). Inside Motorcycles. Vol. 23, no. 2. pp. 68–70.
- Comfort, Nicholas (2012). Surrender : How British industry gave up the ghost 1952-2012. New York: Biteback Publishing. ISBN 978-1-84954-316-3.
- Domínguez, Carlos (17 February 2014). "Víctor Palomo (1948 -1985) "El campeón Aventurero" - Formulamoto" [Víctor Palomo (1948 -1985) "The Adventurer Champion"]. www.formulamoto.es (in Spanish).
- Egan, Peter (1 June 1981). "The Battle of the Twins". Cycle World.
- Falloon, Ian (17 July 2018). Triumph Bonneville: 60 Years. Minneapolis: Motorbooks. ISBN 978-0-7603-6092-7.
- Glueck, William F. (1980). Business policy and strategic management (3d ed.). New York: McGraw-Hill. ISBN 978-0-07-023519-9.
- Harrison, Greg; van Barriger, John (May 1986). "Lucky, Lewes Desecrate Church". American Motorcyclist. Vol. 40, no. 5. p. 43.
- Ludvigsen, Karl (16 May 2001). "The Man Who Powered Ilmor". Atlas F1 Magazine. Vol. 7, no. 20.
- Robson, Graham (2017). Cosworth : the search for power (Sixth ed.). Dorchester: Veloce Publishing. ISBN 978-1-84584-895-8.
- Wagstaff, Ian (2010). The British at Indianapolis. Dorchester, England: Veloce Pub. ISBN 978-1-84584-246-8.
- Williams, Peter (14 October 2012). Peter Williams Designed To Race. Brooklands Books. ISBN 978-1-85520-956-5.
- "1975 Norton Challenge P86 Frame no. 003". Bonhams. 2015.
- "A c.1974 NVT 'Cosworth' Prototype Engine". Bonhams.
- "Bob Graves". Daily Telegraph. 10 December 2012.
- "BOTT". www.westcoastbritishracing.com.
- "c.1974 NVT 'Cosworth' Experimental Prototype Frame no. none Engine no. none". Bonhams.
- "Fire At the National Motorcycle Museum". www.normanwhite.co.uk.
- "Harley talks to Big Four, Looks to Triumph". Cycle World. Vol. 23, no. 1. January 1984.
- "Modern Road Racing". AHRMA. 31 July 2011.
- "Motorbike museum burned out". The Guardian. 17 September 2003.
- "National Motorcycle Museum reopens". BBC - Birmingham. December 2004. Archived from the original on 2 March 2007.
- "Offered from the National Motorcycle Museum Collection, 1975 Norton-Cosworth Challenge P86 750cc Racing Motorcycle Frame no. JN 1 Engine no. none visible". Bonhams.
- "Rob Sewell". Isle of Man TT Race Results.
