= Norton Commando =

British motorcycle produced from 1967 to 1977

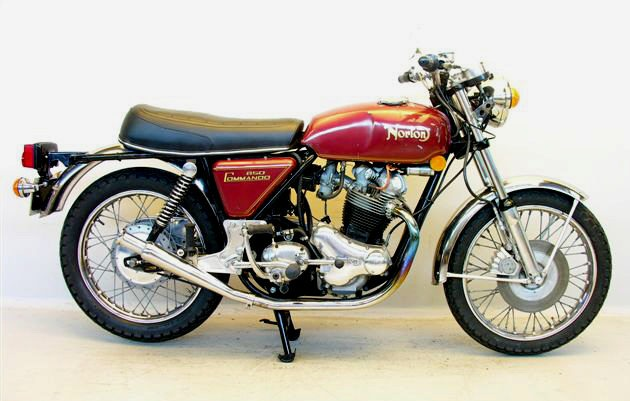
- 1973 Commando 850
- Manufacturer: Norton Motorcycle Company
- Also called: SS, Hi-Rider, 850 Roadster, 850 Interstate
- Engine: 745 and 828 cc (45.5 and 50.5 cu in) air-cooled OHV parallel-twin
- Top speed: 115 mph (185 km/h) (750)
- Power: 58 bhp (43 kW) @ 6,800 rpm (750)
- Transmission: 4-speed (chain)
- Wheelbase: 56.75 in (1,441 mm)
- Dimensions: L: 87.5 in (2,220 mm); W: 26 in (660 mm)
- Seat height: (nominal) 33 – 34 in (838.2 – 863.6 mm)
- Weight: 420 lb (190 kg) (dry)
- Fuel capacity: 10 L (2.2 imp gal; 2.6 US gal)

The Norton Commando is a British Norton-Villiers motorcycle with an OHV pre-unit parallel-twin engine, produced by the Norton Motorcycle company from 1967 until 1977. Initially having a nominal 750 cc displacement, actually 745 cc (45.5 cu in), in 1973 it became an 850 cc, actually 828 cc (50.5 cu in). It had a hemi-type head, similar to all OHV Norton engines since the early 1920s.

During its ten years of production, the Commando was popular all over the world. In the United Kingdom it won the Motor Cycle News "Machine of the Year" award for five successive years from 1968 to 1972. Around 60,000 Commandos were made in total.

== Background ==
Associated Motor Cycles (AMC), Norton's parent company, had become bankrupt in 1966 and had been purchased by Manganese Bronze Holdings, who already owned Villiers Engineering, forming Norton-Villiers. Chairman Dennis Poore saw the need to produce a new flagship motorcycle to replace the aging 750 cc Atlas, the engine design of which could be traced back to Bert Hopwood's 1947 497 cc (30.3 cu in) Norton Model 7 twin. Poore set a deadline for the machine to be ready for the 1967 Earls Court motorcycle show.

Former Velocette engineer Charles Udall had joined AMC in 1961 and had designed an 800 cc (49 cu in) DOHC twin and a prototype built using a shortened featherbed frame. This was known internally as P10 (project 10). Poore set up a design team to develop the P10 headed by former Rolls-Royce engineer Dr. Stefan Bauer. However the P10 was complex, leaked oil and would be expensive to manufacture; the design team started to redesign the engine, giving the revised engine a new code of Z26.

Vibration is an inherent problem of vertical twins. Bauer believed the classic Norton featherbed frame enhanced the problem and was not designed in compliance with good engineering principles. Bauer designed a new frame around a single 2.25 in (57 mm) top tube to increase stiffness and rubber mounted the engine to isolate the engine vibrations from the rider.

By the summer of 1967 it was evident that the new engine would not be developed enough for the September Earls Court show. In parallel to the new engine, the existing Atlas engine had been developed and was now putting out more power than the Z26. A decision was made to abandon the new engine and get an Atlas engined new model using Bauer's frame ready for the show. Poore wanted the new machine to look significantly different, so the engine was canted forward (Nortons traditionally had upright cylinders) and consultants Wolff Ohlins were commissioned to design new bodywork. Wolff Ohlins designed a one-piece seat and tail unit which blended into the tank, all in fibreglass.

Rubber mounting the engine had caused problems under acceleration, the rear mounts distorting causing the chain to jump off the engine sprocket. This was overcome by Norton-Villiers Chief Engineer Bernard Hooper and his assistant Bob Trigg by mounting the swinging arm on the engine/gearbox plates rather than the frame, allowing the engine, gearbox and swinging arm to move as one.

== Production ==
Production of the machine was initially complex and located across different parts of England, with the engines produced in Wolverhampton, frames in Birmingham, while components and final assembly was at Burrage Grove, Plumstead, London. In late 1968 Plumstead works was subject to a Greater London Council compulsory purchase order, and closed in July 1969. With assistance of a Government subsidy, the assembly line was moved to North Way, Andover; with the Test Department in an aircraft hangar on Thruxton Airfield. Engine and gearbox assembly was still in Wolverhampton, in the former Villiers factory, where a second production line produced about 80 complete machines each week. Components and completed engines and gearboxes were also shipped overnight, from Wolverhampton to the Andover assembly line.

=== Norton Villiers Triumph ===
Following the problems caused by the Combat engine, Norton's finances had deteriorated. By the middle of 1972 the BSA group was in serious financial trouble as a result of its BSA and Triumph motorcycle activities. The government offered a financial rescue package contingent on a merger of the two groups and Norton Villiers Triumph (NVT) was formed in 1973.

NVT had four factories; Small Heath, Birmingham (ex BSA), Meriden, West Midlands (Triumph) and the two Norton factories at Andover and Wolverhampton. To increase efficiency, the NVT decided to cut this back to two factories. Redundancy notices were issued at Andover in late 1973, followed by a sit-in at the works. Redundancy notices were also issued at Meriden which resulted in a sit-in there which lasted two years. Commando production was transferred in total to Wolverhampton. The Meriden sit-in affected Triumph production at Small Heath as they were reliant on parts from Meriden. By the end of 1974 NVT had lost over £3 million.

In 1975 the Industry Minister recalled a loan for £4 million and refused to renew the company's export credits. The company then went into receivership and redundancies were announced for all of the staff at the various sites. To avoid total liquidation, the Government backed the formation of NVT Engineering Ltd, to produce spares and to complete manufacture of Commandos already started. By September 1977 the outstanding 1,500 Commandos had been completed. The remaining spares were sold to Andover-Norton, who produced a further 30 machines.

== Technical details ==
=== Engine ===
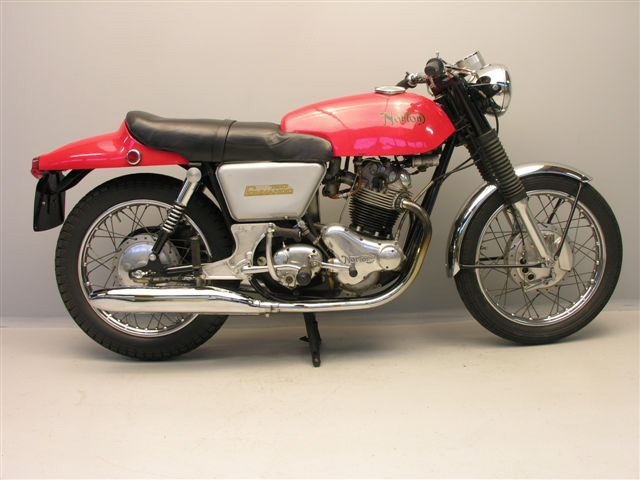
1969 750 cc Commando engine and gearbox

The origins of the Commando engine can be traced back to the late 1940s when the 497 cc (30.3 cu in) Norton Model 7 Twin was designed by Bert Hopwood. The twin-cylinder design evolved into 600 cc, then the 650 cc Manxman and Dominator until superseded by 750 cc Atlas before being launched as the 750 cc Commando in 1967.

The canted-forward engine retained the 73 mm (2.9 in) x 89 mm (3.5 in) bore and stroke of the Atlas engine. Compression ratio was raised to 8.9:1 and the engine breathed through two 30mm Amal Concentric carburettors and the power output increased to 58 bhp (43 kW) at 6,500 rpm. An alternator replaced the previous magneto and dynamo. Points for the coil ignition were mounted on a chain driven jackshaft at the rear of the engine where the magneto had previously been positioned. The engine was designated 20M3, the 750 being Norton's model 20 and this engine being the third incarnation of the engine.

When production of the engine moved from Plumstead to Wolverhampton, the engine was updated with the points moving from the rear of the engines to the end of the camshaft, being accessible behind a plate on the timing cover. The tachometer drive was moved from the end of the camshaft to a position more inboard. The rocker covers, which previously had a sandcast finish, were polished on the revised engine. These engines were designated 20M3S.

Transmission retained the pre-unit 4 speed Norton gearbox with a new diaphragm clutch and triplex primary drive. These were accommodated in a new alloy cover that had a single bolt fixing. The gearbox was strengthened and the clutch plates were changed to sintered bronze when the 850 engine was introduced. A hydraulic primary chain tensioner was introduced for the Mk3 850 and the chaincase cover changed to 12 screw fixing in an attempt to cure oil leaks.

The Commando had suffered from premature main bearing failures and in late 1971 a stiffer crankcase was introduced and the drive side main bearing changed from ball to roller. Having roller main bearings on both sides necessitated the use of shims to control endplay. The crankcase breather was also moved from on the camshaft to the rear of the engine.

The 'Combat' engine was introduced in January 1972 and was based on the engine used in the production racer. The combat was stamped with 'C' on top of the engine and delivered 65 bhp (48 kW) at 6500 rpm by using a 10:1 compression ratio, an SS camshaft and 32 mm carburettors. The SS camshaft made the engine 'peaky' with little power so to improve acceleration the overall gearing was reduced. This increased the possibility over overrevving, even in top gear when the red line was reached at 108 mph (174 km/h). The engine proved unreliable, with main bearing failures and broken pistons. The 'Combat' engine's quality control problems exacerbated the company's troubles. On the Commando engine the chain driving the camshaft was difficult to adjust and was frequently missed during maintenance and servicing. As the points were driven off the camshaft, this led to incorrect ignition timing that added to the problems. The failures were resolved by fitting 'superblend' main bearings and lower compression ratio pistons, which had oil drain holes rather than the slots of the pistons carried over from the Atlas. About 1,500 engines in production were re-worked to the revised specification as well as customer machines being dealt with under warranty. The gearing was also raised on the final 750 cc engines. Revisions to the engine and warranty claims led to few Commandos being available to the public in late 1972. The 750 engine was discontinued at the end of 1973.

The engine size was increased to 828 cc for 1973 by increasing the bore size from 73 to 77 mm and was marketed as an 850. The bottom end of the engine was strengthened and used longer bolts to retain the cylinders. The superblend main bearings were retained. Stronger pistons were used and several measures introduced to try and eliminate oil leaks. An anti-drain valve was fitted into the timing cover on the Mk3 850s to stop oil draining from the oil tank to the sump when the bike was standing.

Using a concept designed by Doug Hele for the Triumph twins, the NVT R&D department, under Norman White, developed a balancing system for the Norton engine to resolve the low speed vibrations of the Commando. The system used an extra conrod and dummy piston and cylinder at 90° to the main cylinders. Whilst the system was never used in production, a similar system was later used by Ducati on the Supermono and BMW on the F800.

A short-stroke 750 was introduced in 1974 and used in the factory racers. It used the 77 mm bore of the 850 with a shorter throw, 80.4 mm, crankshaft. The short-stroke engine was offered as an option on the road going John Player Special.

=== Cycle parts ===
The Commando used the isolastic frame designed by Bauer, Hooper and Trigg. The Roadholder forks were carried over from the Atlas as were the silencers. An 8 in (200 mm) tls front brake that had been an option on previous models was fitted. A new fibreglass tank that tapered towards rear was fitted and matched with a combined seat/rear mudguard. The front of the seat had two "wings" that extended either side of the tank.

In 1969 reports were received from the American importer, Berliner Motor Corporation, of 5 fatalities caused by frame failures. The failures had occurred around the head stock and the American authorities were threatening for ban the import of the bike. Extensive testing of the bike was undertaken at the Chobham testing facility and the problem identified. Ken Sprayson of Reynolds Tube Company, who made the frames for Norton, designed a modified frame to resolve the problems. The modification replaced the existing steering head gusset bracing with a small diameter tube and the top engine steady and petrol tank mountings were moved onto this tube.

The front end was revised in 1969, fork shrouds and gaiters were dropped and replaced with chromed stanchions with a rubber dust seal.

The centre stand was difficult to use and hung low causing it to ground when cornering. In late 1970 the stand was mounted on the engine plates rather than the frame which was easier to use and gave better ground clearance. The side stand was short and unstable, and was replaced with a longer item with a different mounting. Also for the 1971 model year, sealed steering head bearings and new yokes replaced the previous adjustable bearings. With the introduction of the 850 in 1973, the yokes were changed again to change the steering head angle from 27° to 28°, and a stronger centre stand added.

The isolastic system required correct tolerances to work correctly. The tolerances were adjusted by inserting metal shims. The bushes were changed in 1970 to enable easier replacement and with the introduction of the MK3 850 in 1975, adjustable bushes were fitted eliminating the need for shims and making adjustment easier.

Tyres on the Commando were initially 3.00 x 19 ribbed front and 350 x 19 block rear. Following Malcolm Uphill's 100 mph lap in the 750 cc Production TT at the 1969 Isle of Man TT on a Triumph fitted with Dunlop TT100 tyres, the Commando was shod with TT100s, 360 x 19 front and 410 x 19 rear. This was later changed to 4.10 width on both front and rear.

A front disc brake was added as an option from early 1972 and became standard in mid-1972 for all models except the Hi Rider which continued with the drum brake until 1973. A rear disc was added on the 1975 Mk3 850s.

== Models ==
=== 750 cc models ===
The Norton Commando was introduced in 1967 at the Earls Court Show and the first production bikes were available in March 1968. Each bike was road tested and any faults rectified before delivery. The bikes were painted British racing green and the oil tank and left hand side cover were painted silver. The Frame and engine cylinders were finished in black. The model suffered a number of frame breakages.

==== Fastback ====
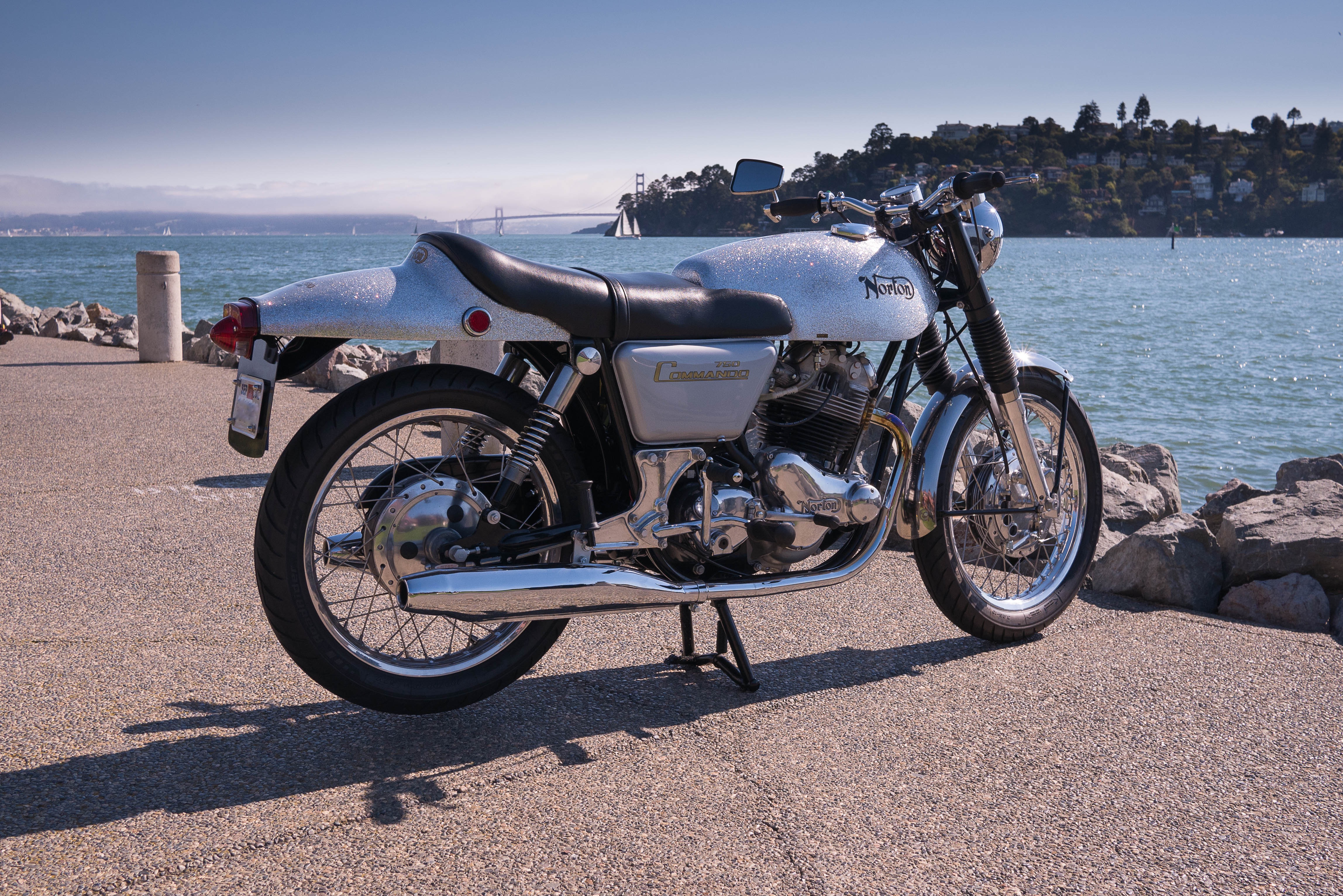
1969 Norton Commando 750 Fastback in Fireflake Silver.

The original model was designated the 'Fastback' in March 1969 to differentiate it from the newly introduced 'S' and 'R' models. A modified frame was fitted to overcome the earlier breakages. A Mk2 Fastback was introduced in September 1970 with revised stands, chain guard, alloy levers with integrated switchgear. and the 20M3S engine. A metal tank, 4.10 x 19 front tyre, upswept exhausts and reverse cone megaphone silencers were fitted on the 1971 MK3.

The ‘Combat engine’ engine was introduced in January 1972 in the Mk4 Fastback. The last of the fastbacks, the MkV, was produced from November 1972 to mid-1973 as a 1973 model and featured improved crank bearings and the standard grind camshaft. Compression was reduced to 9.4:1.

==== R ====
The R model was introduced in 1969 with more conventional styling aimed at the American market. The fibreglass seat and tank of the fastback were replaced with a conventional 2.5 imp gal (11 L; 3.0 US gal) tank, seat and rear mudguard finished in blue or red. The model used the 20M3 engine and was only produced in 1969.

==== S ====
Also introduced in 1969 and aimed for the American market, was the scrambler style S model which had a high level left-side exhausts. The model used the same fibreglass tank as the R model, and a central oil tank was introduced covered by fibreglass side panels. The tank and side panels were finished in metalflake paint. A 5 in (130 mm) chrome headlight was fitted and the front mudguard and chainguard were also chromed. Fork shrouds and gaiters were replaced with a dust seal and chrome plated stanchion. Production continued until the introduction of the 1971 SS model.

==== Interpol ====
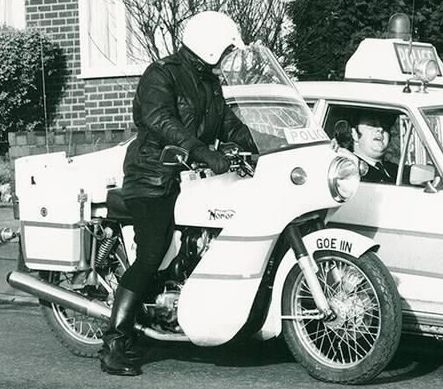
West Midlands Police 1974 or '75 Norton Interpol beside a patrol car

After some police forces expressed interest in the Commando, Neale Shilton was recruited from Triumph to produce a Commando to police specifications. The result was the 'Interpol' machine, which sold well to police forces, both at home and abroad. The 750 cc machine was fitted with panniers, top box, fairing, radio mountings, police lights, and auxiliary equipment.

The machine was first exhibited at the 1969 Brighton Bike Show and was fitted with an Avon fairing with a blue light and Craven panniers. The tank was derived from the Atlas, but with a modified underside to clear the Commando's top frame tube, and a single seat. Shilton took the bike around the UK demonstrating it to the various police forces. Once production started, the basic machine was assembled in the factory and the accessories such as fairings and panniers were fitted off-site. The exact specification varied dependent on the individual forces' requirement. A disc front brake was offered as an option in 1971 and became standard in 1972. Fitment required new handlebars so the master cylinder cleared the fairing. Reverse cone silencers were fitted in 1972, but not upswept like other models in the Commando range so as to give room for the panniers. The larger Interstate tank was fitted from 1972

Most Interpols were finished in white, but some were supplied in dark blue or black and without fairings to be used as 'unmarked' vehicles.

The 'Interpol' name was retained for Norton's later Norton Interpol 2 rotary engined Police motorcycle.

==== Production racer ====
A production racer, featuring a tuned engine, front disc brake and finished in bright yellow was introduced in 1970. It became known as the 'Yellow Peril'. The machine was hand built at the Norton Villiers Performance Centre at the Thruxton Circuit until 1972.

==== Roadster ====
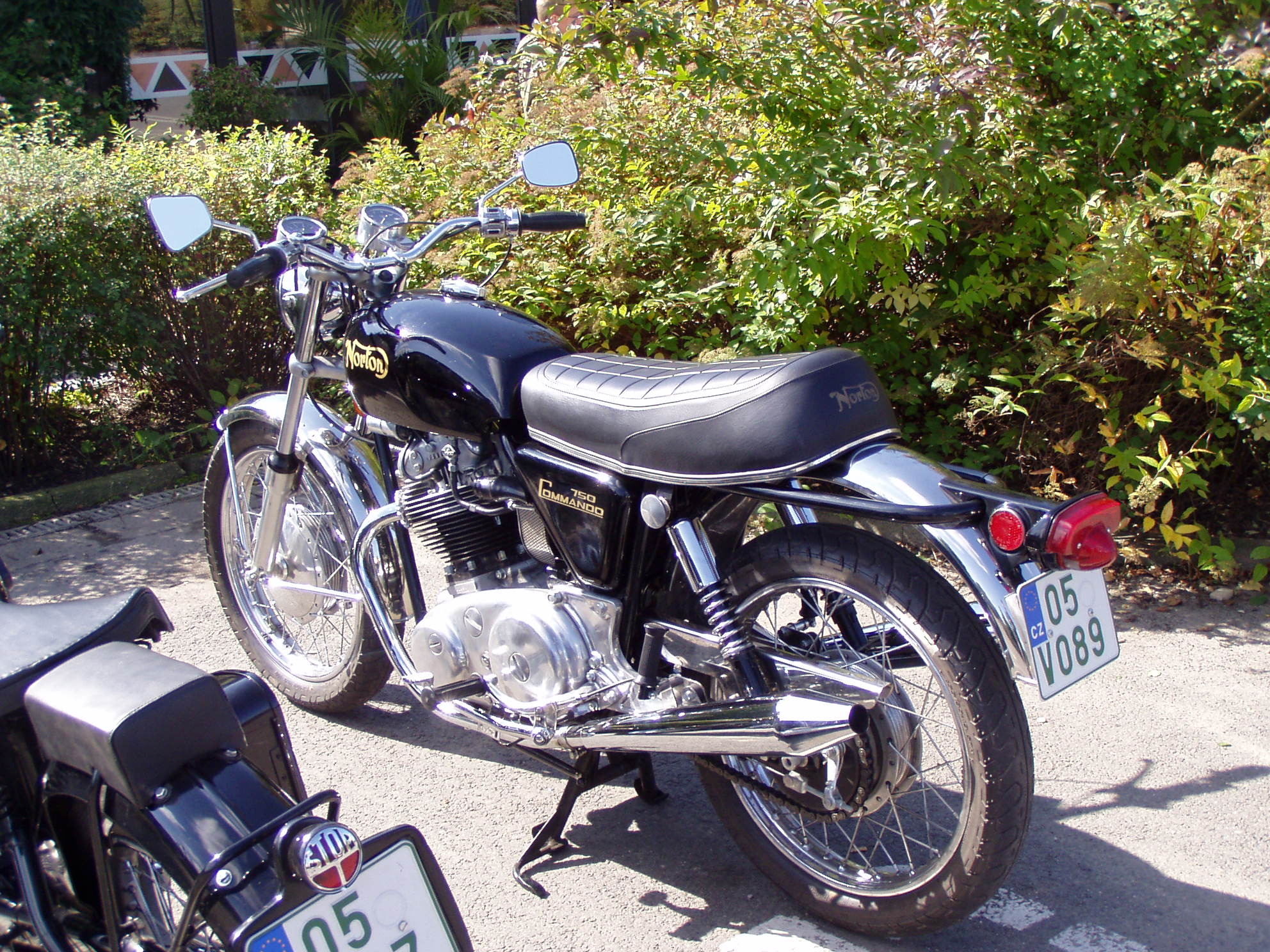
Norton Commando 750cc Roadster

In March 1970 the updated S called the 'Roadster' was introduced. It had a low-level exhaust and upward-angled silencers with reverse cones.

A Mk2 version was introduced in 1971, and in 1972 the Combat engine and front disc brake were fitted.

In 1973 the Roadster was available with the 850 engine, initially as an option but from October 1973 as the sole engine. Production of the Roadster continued until 1977 when manufacture of the Commando stopped, although few Roadsters were made in the final year. The Roadster was the most popular of the Commando models.

==== SS ====
The SS was launched in May 1971 and was an update of the S model. A smaller “peanut” tank was fitted with a shortened seat. The front mudguard was mounted high and the model had a high level pipe each side fitted with a "peashooter" silencer. The model was only produced for 3 months.

==== Hi Rider ====
With Easy Rider styling, the Hi Rider was launched in May 1971. It featured 'ape-hanger' handlebars, a 'banana seat' and a 'sissy bar'. A small highlight and 2.0 imp gal (9.1 L; 2.4 US gal) tank were fitted. A front disc brake was introduced in 1973.

An 850 version was introduced in 1973 and discontinued in 1974.

==== Fastback LR ====
The Fastback LR with increased petrol tank capacity was available from July 1971. Aimed at the Australian market, where most of this model were exported to, production was around 400 machines during 1971 and 1972. The model had a shortened seat with the 'wings' of the fastback and a 3.9 imp gal (18 L; 4.7 US gal) tank. The tank was based on the tank used on the Atlas, but with a different base to clear the Commando's top tube. The machines were available in red or green paintwork.

==== Interstate ====
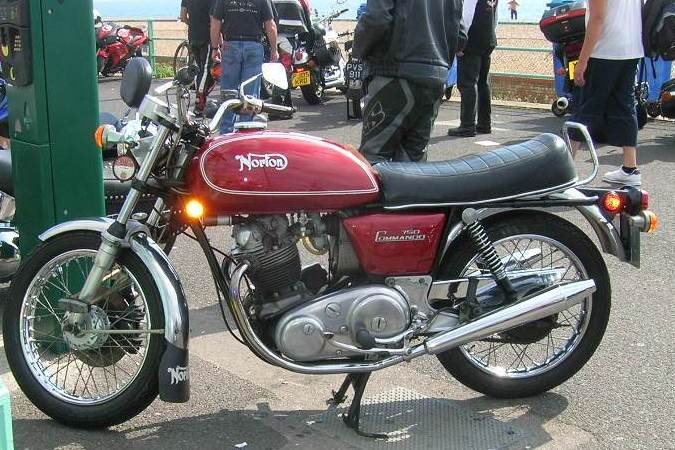
Norton Commando 750 Interstate model with its distinctive large touring size petrol tank.

The Interstate was introduced in January 1972 using the combat engine. A large 5.25 imp gal (23.9 L; 6.30 US gal) petrol tank was used, which was soon increased to 5.5 imp gal (25 L; 6.6 US gal).

In 1973 the Interstate was available with the 850 engine, initially as an option but from October 1973 as the sole engine. Production of the Interstate continued until 1977 when manufacture of the Commando stopped. During the final year most of the Commando production was of the Interstate model.

=== 850 models ===
The larger 850 engine was introduced initially as an alternative to the 750, but as the sole option from late 1973. All 850 models were fitted with a front disc brake.

==== Mk1 ====
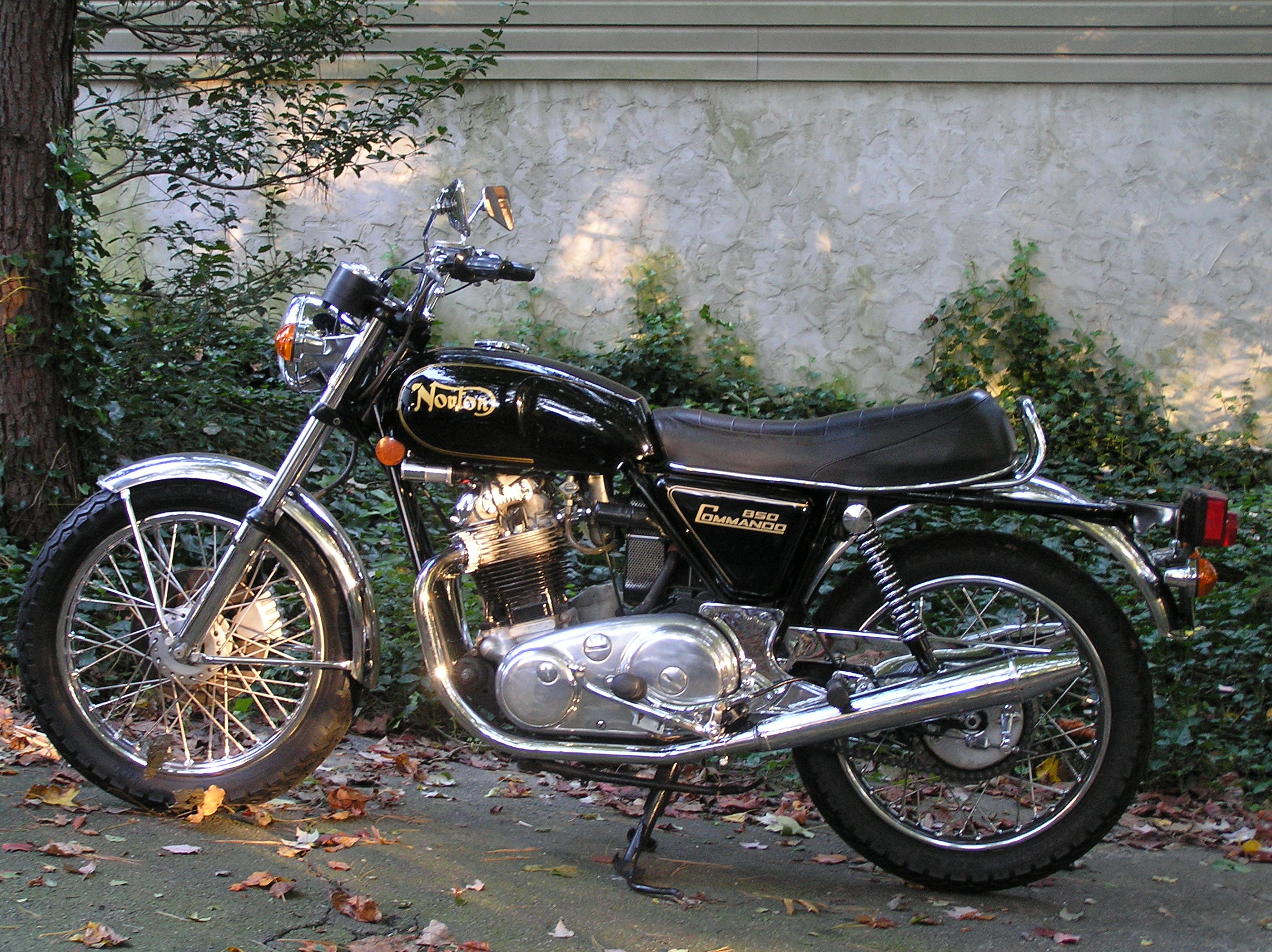
1973 Norton 850 Commando

The Mk1 850 was introduced in March 1973 as Roadster, Interstate, Hi Rider and Interpol versions using the new 828 cc engine. All were fitted with a disc front brake and indicators and had a balance pipe between the exhausts.

To meet the European noise requirements the Interstate and Roadster were available as a Mk1A version with the quieter exhaust using 'annular discharge' and larger airbox. The 2nd gear ratio was raised to help pass the noise test.

==== Mk2 ====
The Mk2 was introduced in 1974 in Interstate, Roadster, Hi rider and Interpol versions. The barrels reverted to being silver painted and the petrol tank on the Interstate was reduced to 4.5 imp gal (20 L; 5.4 US gal). A new colour scheme was available for the roadster: white with red and blue pinstripes.

The Interstate and Roadster continued to be available to meet European noise requirements as the Mk2A, with the quieter exhaust and larger airbox.

===== John Player Special =====
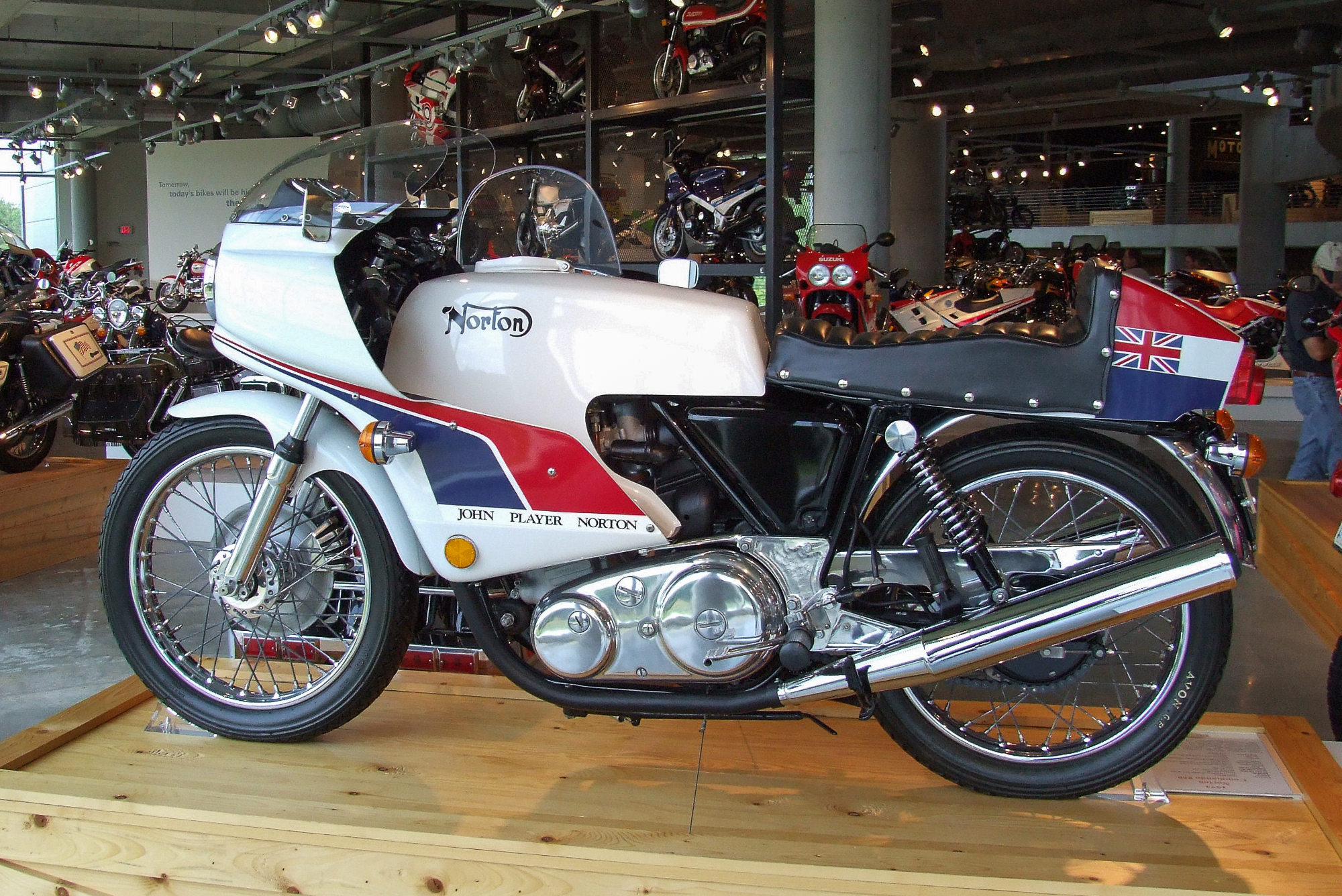
1974 John Player Special

In 1974 a limited-edition version of the Commando was introduced that was fitted with bodywork styled to reproduce the successful Formula 750 works racers that were sponsored by cigarette manufacturers John Player & Sons. The machine was based on the Mk2A 850 Commando. Around 200 of these machines were made, of which about 120 were exported to the US. The bike was expensive, selling for around $3,000 in the US, $500 more than a standard Commando.

The Norton catalogue listed the model being available with the short-stroke engine used on the 1974 racer, either in full race tune or detuned for road use. It is not known how many 750s were made.

==== Mk3 ====
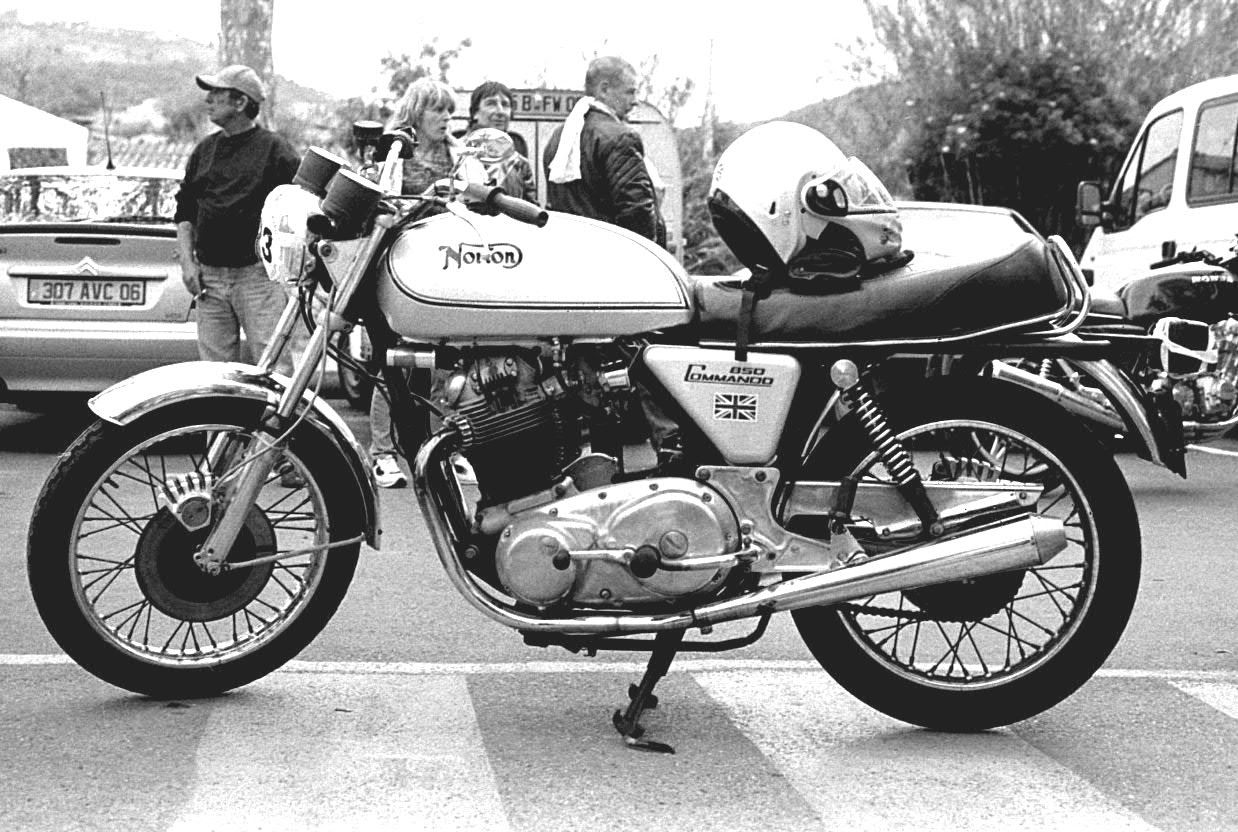
Norton Commando Interstate Mk3

The 850 cc MK3 Commando was launched in 1975 with an improved specification – electric starter, isolastic head steady for improved vibration absorption, left side gear change and right side foot brake to comply with United States vehicle regulations, and a rear disc brake. The electric starter did not work as well as planned and could fail to start the engine when cold.

The range of models was reduced to just two machines, the Mk3 Interstate and the Roadster. The specification remained unchanged until October 1977 when the last machines were made, although few Roadsters were made in the end due to the higher cash sales value of the Interstate.

The weight of the Mk3 had risen to 492 lb (223 kg) and combined with the higher gearing made this one of the slowest Commando models with a top speed of around 105 mph (169 km/h). The model was however the most reliable, oil-tight and robust of the Commandos.

=== Prototypes ===
==== 8 valve ====
In an attempt to prolong the Commando's production life by increasing its power, Poore commissioned Piper Engineering of Ashford, Kent to produce an eight valve head. An engine with the new head was produced which Piper claimed produced 90 bhp (67 kW). The engine was examined by NVT Research Department at Kitts Green by Doug Hele, Norman Hyde and John Barton. They considered that the forked rockers and rocker posts would need redesigning to avoid breakages. They were also concerned the stiff valve springs fitted could lead to excessive camshaft wear and pushrod breakages. The engine was fitted to a bike and tested at MIRA by Barton.

The 8 valve engine was tested on a dynamometer against a racing 4 valve engine supplied by Norton's Thruxton Race Shop. Both engines produced 74 bhp (55 kW) although the 8 valve produced slightly more mid-range power.

==== 850 Mark IV ====
It was planned to update the Commando to maintain sales until the road-going version of the Challenge was ready. The main upgrade for the Mark IV was the use of a single 1.75 in (44 mm) SU Carburettor. Road testing of Commandos fitted with the SU showed the engine ran more cleanly and had better fuel consumption compared to the usual Amal carbs.

Mike Oldfield carried out the styling of the bike, with a new tank, seat and side panels. The riding position was the same as the Roadster Commandos but a larger tank was fitted. A mock-up of the updated bike was made. The collapse of NVT in 1975 meant the Mark IV never reached production.

==== Commando 900 Trisolastic ====
With the Norton twin engine nearing the end of its life in 1975, fitting a Triumph triple into the Commando frame was considered. A 870 cc (53 cu in) T180 engine was fitted into a Commando Roadster at Kitts Green. Although the prototype had good speed and handling, the isolastic mounting failed to isolate the rider from vibrations.

The Trisolastic was never as smooth as we would have liked. Apparently the vibrations of the three cylinder were different from those of the Norton twin. We tried numerous motor insulating assemblies, without ever finding the solution

— Doug Hele

Trisolastic is derived from tri referring to both Triumph and the 3 cylinder engine, and isolastic from the Commando's rubber mounting system. The prototype is on display at the British National Motorcycle Museum.

==== Norton 76 ====
Following the closure of the Wolverhampton factory the workers, led by a Senior Shop Stewards Action Committee, occupied the factory. They hoped to create a workers cooperative similar to that at Meriden. In February 1976 an updated version of the Commando, the Norton 76, was shown to the public.

The Norton 76, designed by Bernard Hooper and John Favill, incorporated the engine improvements developed for the proposed Mk IV Commando including a reworked cylinder head with 10.5:1 compression ratio and a SU carburettor and met the proposed US emission regulations. The wheelbase was lengthened to 60 in (1,500 mm) by lengthening the swinging arm and changing the steering head angle. Italian Paioli forks were used. FPS cast alloy wheels were fitted. Braking was by twin discs on the front and a single disc at the rear, all fitted with Brembo callipers. A restyled tank was fitted. The cooperative failed to raise the necessary funding and the bike never entered production.

== Racing ==
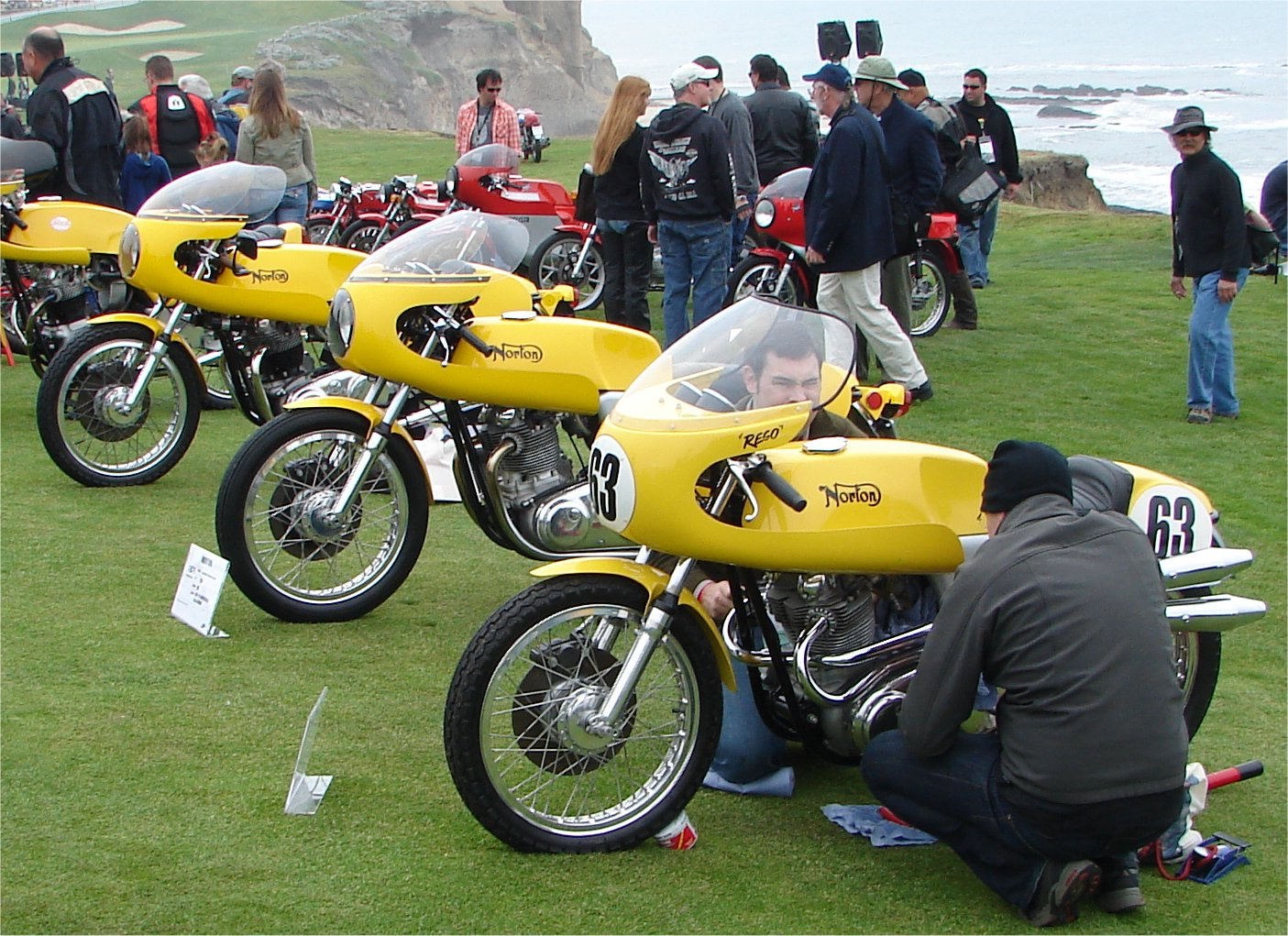
Norton Commando Production Racers

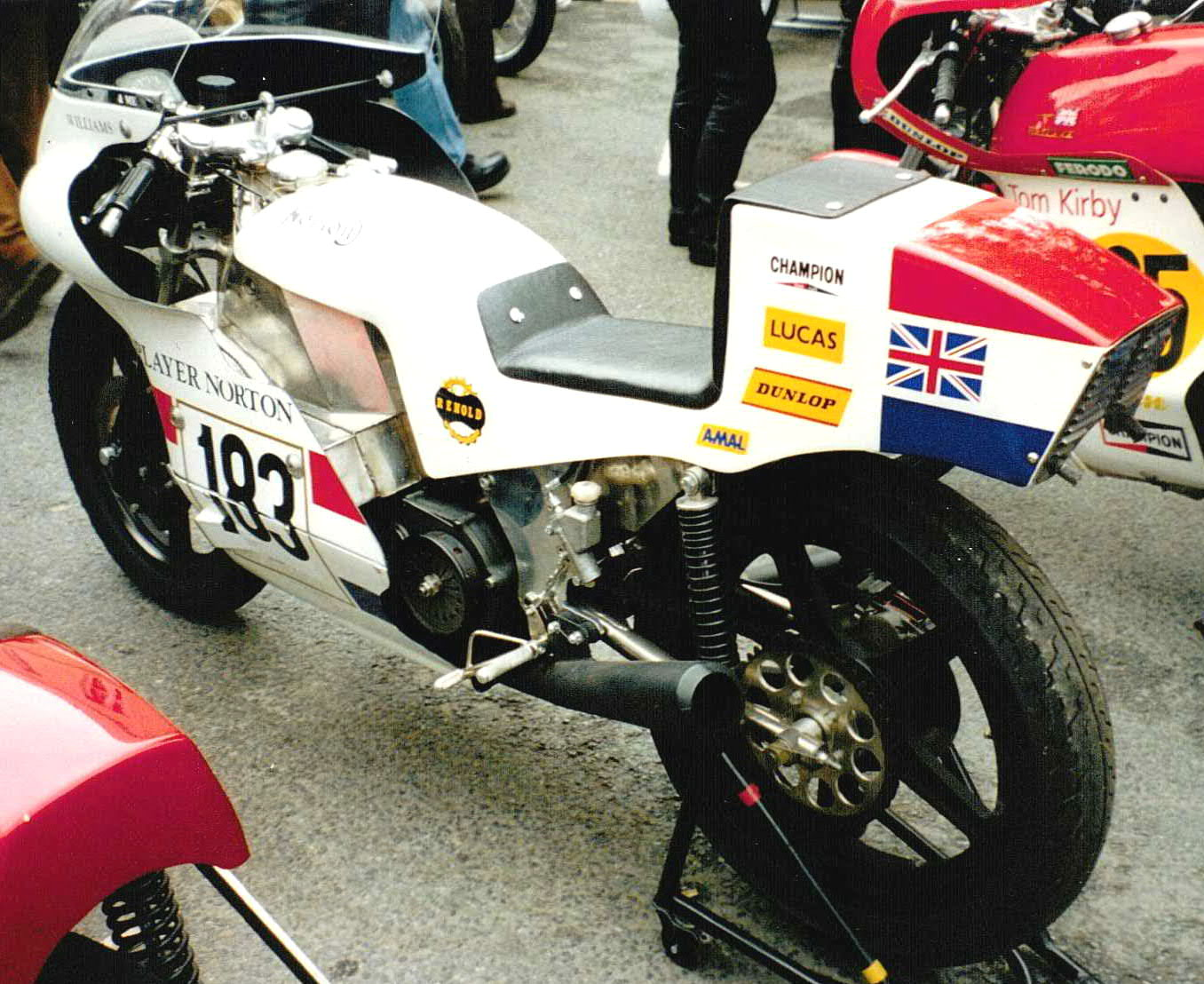
1973 Norton Monocoque displayed at Castletown, Isle of Man in 1999

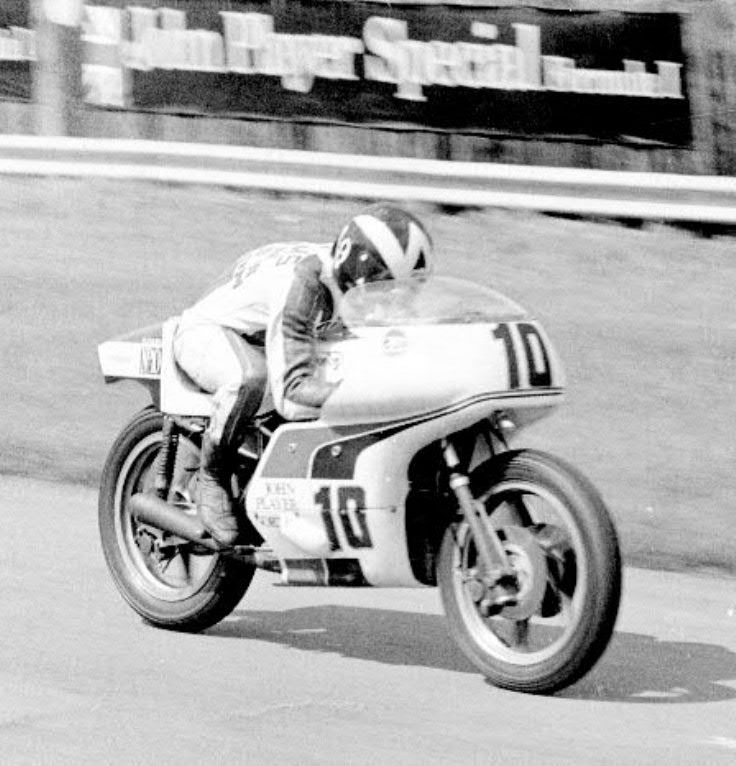
Peter Williams on a 1974 JPN Space frame

From its 1967 beginnings the Commando took part in racing events. After successes in 1969 by factory and dealer-entered machines like Paul Smart's second and Mick Andrew's 4th places in the Isle of Man TT Production class and a win in the Hutchinson 100 Production Class by Mick Andrew on the Gus Kuhn entered Commando and 5th by Peter Williams, the company decided to produce a production racing model which became known as the Yellow Peril.

One of the first victories for the bike was at the 1970 Thruxton 500 with riders Charlie Sanby and Peter Williams. At that year's Isle of Man 750 Production TT, Williams came close to winning but ran out of petrol with sight of the finish line whilst leading. One of the first bikes was brought by an Italian team and on it their rider, Giuliano Ermanno, won the 1970 100 Miglia di Imola. At the 1971 Isle of Man TT, Williams set a new lap record of over 101 mph in the 750 Production TT before retiring.

With sponsorship from John Player to promote their John Player Special brand of cigarettes the John Player Norton racing team was set up in November 1971 to compete in Formula 750 events. Current 250cc world champion Phil Read was recruited to the team, as was former Suzuki GP rider Frank Perris to act as team manager. The bikes were designed by Peter Williams.

in 1972 Williams won the Hutchinson 100 at Brands Hatch, Mick Grant led a procession of JPNs to victory at Scarborough and Read won the British season's finale at Brands' Race of the South.

A new bike was designed for 1973 with a semi-monocoque chassis giving a small frontal area and low centre of gravity by carrying the oil and fuel as low as possible. A Peel-type fairing incorporating handlebar blisters and seat tailpiece were developed in the MIRA wind tunnel and the drag coefficient was reduced to 0.39.

In total the monocoque won 14 international races in 1973 including Williams winning the Formula 750cc TT with Mick Grant second.

The 1974 model was built with a compact space frame to keep the frontal area as small as possible and was again fitted with an all-enveloping peel-style fairing. Williams and Dave Croxford competed at a number of European such as Imola and Spa, where Williams won.

The John Player sponsorship had been for three years. As Norton's parent company at the time, Norton Villiers Triumph, were experiencing financial difficulties, the racing programme was cut back. The sponsorship deal with John Player was not renewed.

In 1975 the race shop produced ten over-the-counter club racers, the TX750 "Thruxton Club" Racer. The machines used a modified Commando frame and the short stroke motor.

== Commando revival ==
Following the demise of Norton and the end of Commando production, a number of companies have produced "new" Commandos, either re-manufacturing Norton built machines or new builds using newly manufactured parts. These include:

Colorado Norton Works

Swede Matt Rambow, who emigrated to the US in 1984, opened his workshop in Dolores, Colorado in 1997. The remanufactured machines can be built to customers specifications including upgrades to modern suspension, brakes etc.

Vintage Rebuilds

Kenny Dreer started rebuilding Commandos at Vintage Rebuilds in the 1990s. The workshop is located near Portland, Oregon. Dreer started to upgrade the machines he rebuilt with modern suspension, brakes and other updated components. In 1999 he produced a run of about 50 VR880 machines. The VR880 has a beefed up engine of 880 cc, updated suspension and brakes and used 80% new components. A few were fitted with hand -formed aluminium bodywork by Evan Wilcox.

Norvil Motorcycle Company

Norvil was founded in 1980 by Les Emery to produce spares for Norton motorcycles. They are joint owners of the Norvil (Norton-Villiers) trademark and hold a perpetual licence to use the Norton name. As well as manufacturing spares, they also manufacture complete Commandos.

== 961 Commando ==
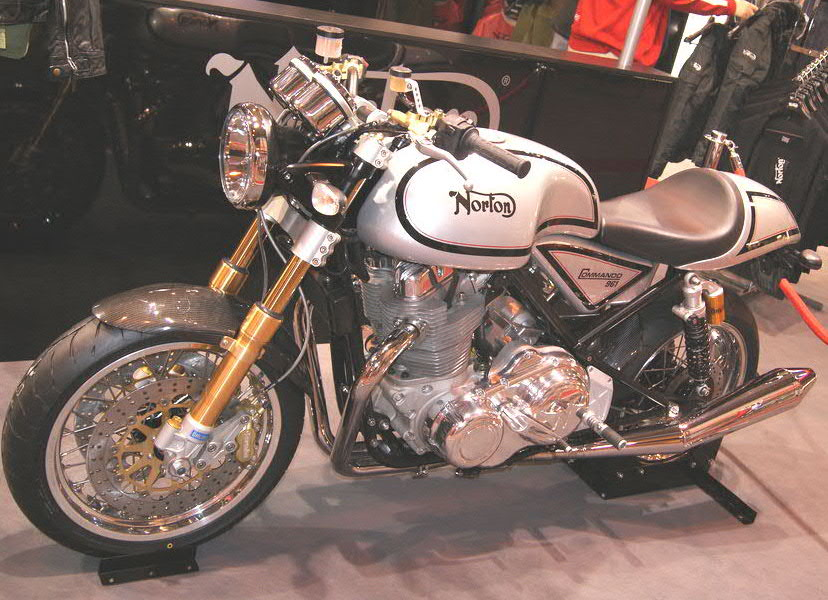
Norton Commando 961

Following on from the VR880, Kenny Dreer of Vintage wanted to build an all-new motorcycle as a successor to the Commando. With funding from Oliver Curme, Dreer hired a small design and development team led by Paul Gaudio (Design and development director), Simon-Pierre Smith (Lead Engineer), and Patrick Leyshock (Testing, Sourcing.) The new machine, called the 961 Commando never reached production in America due to lack of funding, and the company closed its doors in April 2006.

UK businessman Stuart Garner bought the rights to the design in 2008 and established a new factory at Donington Park, Leicestershire. The first machine came off the production line in March 2010. The 961 Commando was very well received; its design echoed that of the old pre-unit pushrod design, but was more modern, with an output of 79bhp, five-gears, Ohlins suspension and effective disc brakes. Production continued for more than a decade, but the Donington factory closed in 2020, and the "Norton" trademarked name and assets were transferred to an Indian-owned firm, TVS Motor Company, based in Solar Park, Solihull. TVS further refined the design and improved the build quality, and the "upgraded" 961 was released in 2023 to great acclaim.

== In film and television ==
A Commando 850 is used as the titular villainous bike in the 1990 horror film I Bought a Vampire Motorcycle.

A 1973 Commando 850 is featured in the 2008 Canadian movie titled One Week, about a young man with terminal cancer who rides across Canada on one.

== See also ==
- Métisse Motorcycles – Mk5 Road Racer
