= Peter Williams (motorcyclist) =

British motorcycle racer (1939–2020)

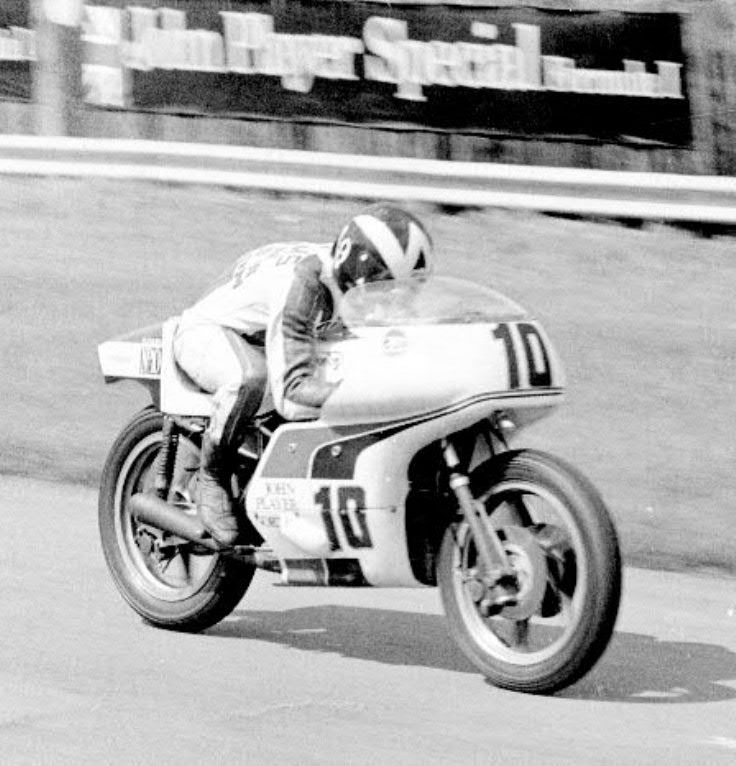
- Peter Williams on the 1974 Norton with Space Triangulation frame
- Nationality: British
- Born: 27 August 1939
- Died: 20 December 2020 (aged 81)
Motorcycle racing career statistics
Grand Prix motorcycle racing
Active years	1966 – 1973
First race	1966 350cc Dutch TT
Last race	1973 Isle of Man 500cc Senior TT
First win	1971 350cc Ulster Grand Prix
Last win	1971 350cc Ulster Grand Prix
Team	MZ
Championships	0
Starts / Wins / Podiums / Poles / F. laps / Points; 18 / 1 / 11 / N/A / 1 / 119

Peter Williams (27 August 1939 – 20 December 2020) was a British former professional motorcycle racer and engineer. He competed in Grand Prix motorcycle road racing from 1966 to 1973 as well as in British short-circuit races. The son of Jack Williams who led the Associated Motor Cycles (AMC) racing department, Williams encompassed a rare combination of talents as a proficient motorcycle racer as well as an innovative motorcycle designer. Trained in mechanical engineering, Williams was modest and soft-spoken with a studious appearance that was the antithesis of a stereotypical motorcycle racer. He pioneered the use of alloy wheels and disc brakes in motorcycle racing and was one of the first motorcycle racers to adopt the full-face helmet.

The highpoint of Williams' career came in 1973 when he won the Isle of Man Formula 750 TT race riding a motorcycle of his own design. Williams was notable for his dedication to riding the underpowered, single-cylinder Matchless G50 motorcycle on which he placed second in the Isle of Man Senior TT four times, most frequently to Giacomo Agostini and his powerful MV Agusta. After he was seriously injured in a race in 1974, he retired from competition and continued his engineering career with Cosworth and Lotus Cars.

== Riding career ==
=== Early life ===
Williams was born in Nottingham, England, as the son of Jack Williams, the head of the AMC race department. His father was involved in the development of the World Championship winning AJS Porcupine and then the AJS 7R and Matchless G50. After training as a draughtsman, Williams worked in the drawing office at the Ford Dagenham factory. As his father had discouraged him from motorcycle racing, Williams did not begin to compete on British race circuits until he was 24 years old. He rose to prominence in 1964 when he shared an AJS model 14 CSR motorcycle with Tony Wood to win the 250 cc class at the 1964 Thruxton 500 endurance race. He was easily recognized by the large letter W painted on the front of his helmet, a logo that he used for his entire racing career.

Williams rode a 350 cc Norton Manx motorcycle in the Junior TT at the 1964 Manx Grand Prix but failed to finish the race. In the 250 cc Class, he scored a third place finish on a Greeves Silverstone. His performance earned him a job offer to join the Greeves factory as draughtsman where he helped develop a water-cooled 250 cc Greeves road racer.

In 1965, Williams entered his first Senior TT during the Isle of Man TT races riding a 500 cc Dunstall Norton but was forced to abandon the race while lying in third place due to an engine failure. In the 1965 Lightweight TT, he scored a third place result riding an Orpin Greeves Silverstone. Williams began an eight-year collaboration in 1965 with motorcycle designer and tuner, Tom Arter riding a 350 cc AJS built by John Surtees as well as a Matchless G50.

=== Tom Arter collaboration ===
Williams won the 1966 North West 200 riding a Matchless G50 then rode an AJS 7R to a second-place finish behind Giacomo Agostini (MV Agusta) in the Junior TT race at the 1966 Isle of Man TT. He scored the first podium result of his career when he rode a Tom Arter prepared Matchless G50 to finish in second place behind Agostini at the 1966 500 cc Nations Grand Prix held at the Monza Circuit. By 1966, AMC fell into receivership and eventually became a part of Norton-Villiers, who would take over the BSA motorcycle factory a few years later.

In early 1967, Williams marketed an engineering solution to enable a proprietary disc brake assembly produced and merchandised by Rickman Motorcycles to be fitted to Norton Manx and AJS 7R/Matchless G50 racing machines. Also in 1967, Williams and Arter began work on a motorcycle to replace their Matchless G50 using a prototype, twin-cylinder 500 cc Weslake engine, a project that would be abandoned due to financial constraints.

For the 1967 Grand Prix season, Williams and Arter decided to campaign their single-cylinder Matchless G50 in a full season of World Championship competition against the MV Agusta and Honda factory teams and their powerful multi-cylinder machines. Agostini won the opening round in Germany while Mike Hailwood's Honda broke down, allowing Williams to claim second place. At the 1967 Isle of Man TT, Hailwood claimed a thrilling victory after Agostini's machine broke its drive chain on the final lap, letting Williams claim another fortuitous second place. At the third round at Assen, Hailwood and Agostini came first and second, with Williams in third place, so after the first three rounds of the season he was the championship points leader as a privateer racer on a motorcycle considered to be obsolete. He severely injured his ankle while competing in the 350 cc East German Grand Prix and was forced to withdraw from the remainder of the season. He ended the season ranked fourth in the 500 cc Class which marked the best result of his World Championship racing career.

Mike Hailwood had arranged for Williams to join him on the Honda team for the 1968 season, but then the FIM implemented new rules limiting all gearboxes to six-speeds, 125cc and 250cc motorcycles to no more than two cylinders, and 350cc and 500cc motorcycles to four cylinders. The new rules favored two-stroke engines over four-stroke engines in the smaller displacement classes, and since the Honda factory had a company policy to race only four-stroke motorcycles, they decided to withdraw from motorcycle racing to concentrate on Formula 1 racing. Honda's departure left the MV Agusta factory as the only major manufacturer to field a racing team in the World Championships. After rejecting an offer to race an all-British Read-Weslake 500GP twin, Williams returned to race the Tom Arter Matchless G50 for the 1968 season.

At the 1968 Daytona 200, Williams rode the underpowered Matchless G50 against larger and more powerful 750 cc motorcycles to finish in 8th place. He placed fourth at the 1968 Dutch TT along with a fifth place in Czechoslovakia to end the season ranked sixth in the 1968 500 cc World Championship standings.

After the collapse of AJS, Williams joined the Norton-Villiers Drawing Office in 1969. He suffered from chronic asthma which forced him to miss the 1969 Isle of Man TT, but returned to competition at the 1969 Dutch TT where he led the first two laps on the single-cylinder Matchless before Agostini and the MV Agusta 500 Three caught and passed him to take the lead and eventual victory with Williams finishing in second place. The Arter-Matchless motorcycle was then loaned to Jack Findlay who destroyed it one week later in a crash while competing in the 500 cc Belgian Grand Prix.

Findlay's crash gave Arter and Williams the opportunity to rebuild the Matchless motorcycle using a lighter, slimmer frame made from narrower-gauge tubing by Formula One chassis constructors Grand Prix Metalcraft. The lightweight chassis also benefitted from a slim, wind-cheating bodywork and was one of the first racing motorcycles to feature hydraulic disc brakes. The motorcycle was also the first to utilise six-spoke, solid-cast Elektron alloy wheels, which were designed by Williams himself at a time when wire-spoked wheels were considered the standard. The motorcycle was dubbed "cart wheels" and "artillery wheels" by British motorsport journalists due to its distinctive wheels.

Williams and Arter developed and modified the Matchless G50 into a proficient racing machine that extended the competitive life of the four-stroke single-cylinder engine during an era dominated by two-stroke engines. By 1969, the era of domination by British single-cylinder engines was over; however, their use of lightweight material and aerodynamics allowed the underpowered yet agile Matchless G50 compete with Agostini's more powerful MV Agusta.

Williams won the 1970 North West 200 500cc race and once again finished second to Agostini in the 1970 Senior TT on the Arter Matchless Special. He then led the massed-start 750 cc class Production TT race on a Norton Commando when he ran out of petrol just yards from the finish line allowing Malcolm Uphill (Triumph) to pass him for the victory. He entered other larger-capacity races on Norton Commando twins, teaming with Charley Sanby to win the 1970 Thruxton 500 endurance race. Williams and the Arter-Matchless won the 1970 British 500cc Championship after a season-long battle with Alan Barnett riding a Colin Seeley-prepared Matchless G50.

Williams repeated his second-place finish behind Agostini aboard the Arter Matchless at the 1971 Isle of Man TT, and placed third in the Formula 1 750cc TT on a Norton Commando behind Tony Jefferies (Triumph) and Ray Pickrell (BSA). Williams won his only world championship race in 1971 riding an MZ to win the 350 cc Ulster Grand Prix. He placed second on his Norton behind Pickrell (Triumph) in the 1972 Formula 1 750cc TT. At the 1972 Hutchinson 100 held at the tight and technical Brands Hatch circuit, Williams used the Matchless' lightweight and agility to catch and pass Agostini’s MV Agusta triple, as the reigning World Champion then crashed while pursuing Williams.

=== John Player Norton ===
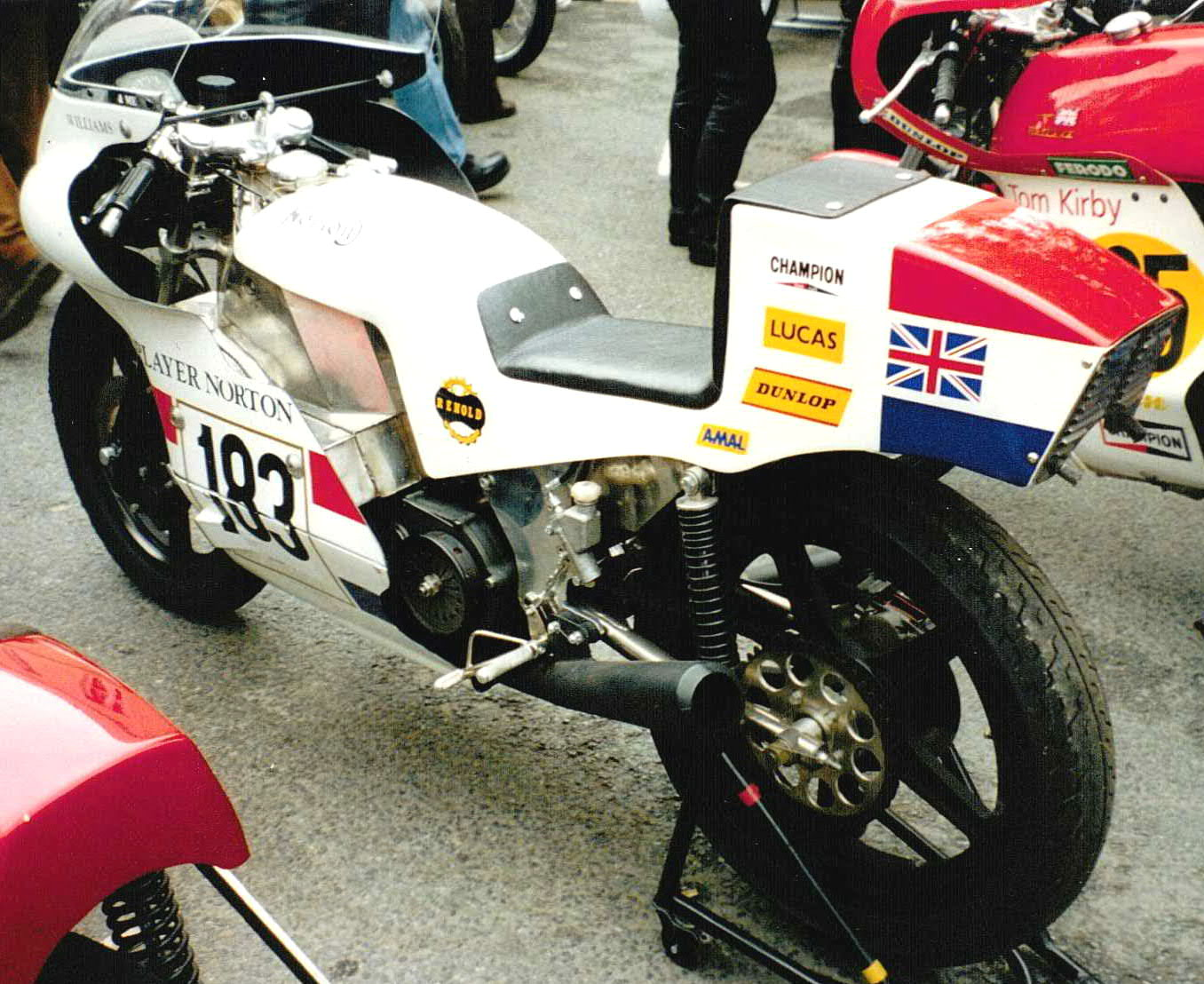
Peter Williams' 1973 John Player Norton 750 with sheet stainless steel semi-monocoque frame, exhibited at Castletown, Isle of Man in 1999

In the role of Norton team designer and development rider, he constructed the John Player Norton with a semi-monocoque frame. The machine was designed as an integrated package with a Peel-type fairing incorporating handlebar blisters which helped to reduce the drag coefficient to 0.39.

Williams was the standout performer for the British team at the 1973 Transatlantic Trophy match races aboard the John Player Norton. The Transatlantic Trophy match races pitted the best British riders against the top North American road racers on 750cc motorcycles in a six-race series in England. Williams ended the series as the top individual points leader with three victories along with a second place and third place results.

At the second round held at Mallory Park, Williams, riding the slower but better handling Norton battled for the lead with Yvon Duhamel, riding the faster Japanese three-cylinder two-stroke engined Kawasaki H2R. Three laps from the end, Duhamel's motorcycle developed a stiff throttle, allowing Williams to take the victory. DuHamel came back to win the second race over second-placed Williams.

At the third round at Oulton Park, Williams claimed the first race victory after early leader, Art Baumann's Kawasaki developed transmission troubles. In the second race, Williams was able to overtake Kawasaki teammates Gary Nixon and Duhamel to claim his third victory of the series. Williams tied Duhamel as the highest individual points scorers, both with 84 points.

Williams won his first and only Isle of Man TT race when he rode the John Player Norton to victory in the 1973 Isle of Man Formula 750 TT race, setting the second fastest-ever lap of the Snaefell Mountain Course at 107.27mph. In the 1973 Senior TT against a field of powerful, twin cylinder motorcycles, Williams rode the Arter Matchless G50 to second place behind Jack Findlay (Suzuki TR500).

The result marked the fourth time that he had finished the Senior TT in second place aboard the antiquated Matchless G50 (1967, 1970, 1971, 1973). Williams' average of 100.62 mph was 2.6 seconds quicker than Mike Hailwood's winning speed in 1961 on a Norton Manx, making them the only two competitors at that point in time to have averaged over 100 mph on a single-cylinder machine in the Senior TT. His single-cylinder TT lap record would stand until 1997, when it was broken by Dave Morris riding a BMW F650.

At the British round of the 1973 Formula 750 season held at the fast and flowing Silverstone Circuit, Williams demonstrated the prowess of his designing skills as he led the race on the John Player Norton against the far more powerful Japanese two-stroke motorcycles, only to run out of petrol one lap from the end of the race.

Williams' competitive riding career was ended by injuries suffered in a racing accident at Old Hall Corner, Oulton Park on August Bank Holiday Monday, 26 August 1974, when the fibreglass one-piece fuel tank/seat/tail unit became detached. Williams agreed to an out of court settlement with Norton. The accident left him without the use of his left arm.

=== Career after racing ===
After his competitive racing career, Williams operated a Kawasaki motorcycle dealership in Southampton. He was employed by Cosworth Engineering in the development of fuel-injected liquid-cooled twin-cylinder motor for the Norton Challenge P86. He also worked on Cosworth’s 3-litre DFV V8 Formula One engine, and a Supermono racebike. Williams then worked for Lotus Cars in the development of a V-twin Superbike with a carbon fiber monocoque frame that was never produced.

Williams presented an erudite voice for motorcyclists at public appearances and university lectures. He planned on producing the EV-0 RR, an electric-powered racing motorcycle intending to compete at the TTXGP Zero Emissions race at the Isle of Man TT in June 2009. He abandoned the project in favor of fabricating an exact replica of his TT-winning monocoque racer for sale, built to original specifications. Only four of the replicas were built at a cost of £65,000 each, before Williams became ill and the project foundered.

Williams died in his sleep on Sunday, 20 December 2020 at the age of 81 after a long illness.

== Motorcycle Grand Prix results ==
**Position**	1	2	3	4	5	6
**Points**	8	6	4	3	2	1

(key) (Races in bold indicate pole position)

Year	Class	Team	1	2	3	4	5	6	7	8	9	10	11	12	13	Points	Rank	Wins
1966	125cc	EMC	ESP -	GER -		NED -		DDR -	CZE -	FIN -	ULS -	IOM -	NAT; 5	JPN -		2	-	0
1966	350cc	AJS		GER -	FRA -	NED -	BEL -		CZE -	FIN -	ULS -	IOM; 2	NAT -	JPN -		6	11th	0
1966	500cc	Matchless		GER -		NED -	BEL -	DDR -	CZE -	FIN -	ULS; 6	IOM; 7	NAT; 2			7	9th	0
1967	350cc	AJS	GER -	IOM; NC	NED -		DDR -	CZE -		ULS -	NAT -		JPN -			0	-	0
1967	500cc	Matchless	GER; 2	IOM; 2	NED; 3	BEL -	DDR -	CZE -	FIN -	ULS -	NAT -	CAN -				6	4th	0
1968	350cc	AJS	GER -		IOM; 21	NED -		DDR -	CZE -		ULS -	NAT -				0	-	0
1968	500cc	Matchless	GER; 3	ESP -	IOM -	NED; 4	BEL -	DDR -	CZE; 5	FIN -	ULS -	NAT -				9	6th	0
1969	500cc	Matchless	ESP -	GER -	FRA -	IOM -	NED; 2	BEL -	DDR -	CZE -	FIN -	ULS -	NAT -	YUG -		12	18th	0
1970	350cc	AJS	GER -		YUG -	IOM; NC	NED -		DDR -	CZE -	FIN -	ULS -	NAT -	ESP -		0	-	0
1970	500cc	Matchless	GER -	FRA -	YUG -	IOM; 2	NED; 7	BEL -	DDR -		FIN -	ULS; 5	NAT -	ESP -		22	10th	0
1971	250cc	MZ	AUT -	GER -	IOM; NC	NED -	BEL -	DDR -	CZE -	SWE -	FIN -	ULS; 4	NAT -	ESP -		8	22nd	0
1971	350cc	MZ	AUT -	GER -	IOM -	NED -		DDR -	CZE -	SWE -	FIN -	ULS; 1	NAT -	ESP -		15	15th	1
1971	500cc	Matchless	AUT -	GER -	IOM; 2	NED -	BEL -	DDR -		SWE -	FIN -	ULS -	NAT -	ESP -		12	13th	0
1972	500cc	Matchless	GER -	FRA -	AUT -	NAT -	IOM; NC	YUG -	NED -	BEL -	DDR -	CZE -	SWE -	FIN -	ESP -	0	-	0
1973	500cc	Matchless	FRA -	AUT -	GER -	IOM; 2	YUG -	NED -	BEL -	CZE -	SWE -	FIN -	ESP -			12	15th	0
