= Norton P10 =

- Manufacturer: Norton Motorcycle Company
- Parent company: Associated Motor Cycles
- Assembly: Plumstead, London
- Successor: Norton Z26
- Class: Prototype
- Engine: 800 cc (49 cu in) air cooled DOHC parallel twin
- Ignition type: Magneto
- Transmission: Unit construction 5 speed chain drive

The Norton P10 was a prototype motorcycle designed by AMC in the 1960s. It used a unit construction 800 cc DOHC parallel twin engine. The model suffered from oil leaks and severe vibration during testing and was never put into production. Following the collapse of AMC in 1966 and the subsequent takeover by Manganese Bronze Holdings to form Norton-Villiers, the prototype was used as a starting point of the Z26, which was intended as a replacement for the Norton Atlas.

== History ==
Charles Udall had joined AMC as engineering director in 1961 from Velocette, where he had been involved in the design of the M-series engines and the LE. He started designing a new DOHC twin, initially as a 750 but soon increased to 800 cc. A prototype was built, using a shortened featherbed frame, which was extensively road-tested, included at the MIRA track at Lindley, near Nuneaton.

The engine had bad vibration problems and development engineer Wally Wyatt tried rubber mounting the engine. During acceleration in the lower gears the rubber mountings would distort causing the engine to move which resulted in the drive chain jumping off its sprockets.

Oil leaks were also a problem. Test rider John Wolverson later recalled "It would go out on road test, and when it came back it looked as if someone had poured a gallon of oil all over it.".

The engine was complex and would have been expensive to produce.

== Technical details ==
The engine was a unit construction DOHC parallel twin and had a 5 speed gearbox. Continuing from Udall's designs at Velocette, the engine used a one piece crankshaft which ran on tapered roller bearings. Whilst this arrangement worked well on the narrow Velocette singles, the width of the twin required the bearing to be pre-loaded by 11 thou (0.28 mm) when cold to eliminate end float when hot.

A long (4 ft (1.2 m)) chain drove the camshafts and the magneto, which was mounted at the rear of the engine. The chain ran from the crankcases to the head in external tubes. The tubes were coated internally with PTFE and had a rubber O ring top and bottom to seal them. To avoid a split link in the chain, the tubes were threaded onto the chain before it was riveted and fitted to the engine. The camshaft sprockets had vernier adjustment to allow precise timing. The long chain caused the engine to sound noisy and the chain was prone to failures. Journalist Bob Currie described the engine as being 'clattery'.

Crankcase pressure was controlled by a breather fitted with a reed valve. This caused the engine to emit a flatulence like sound when the engine was kicked over.

Despite the use of overhead cams, the engine didn't produce any more power than the Atlas engine it was intended to replace.
