= Norton Commando Production Racer =

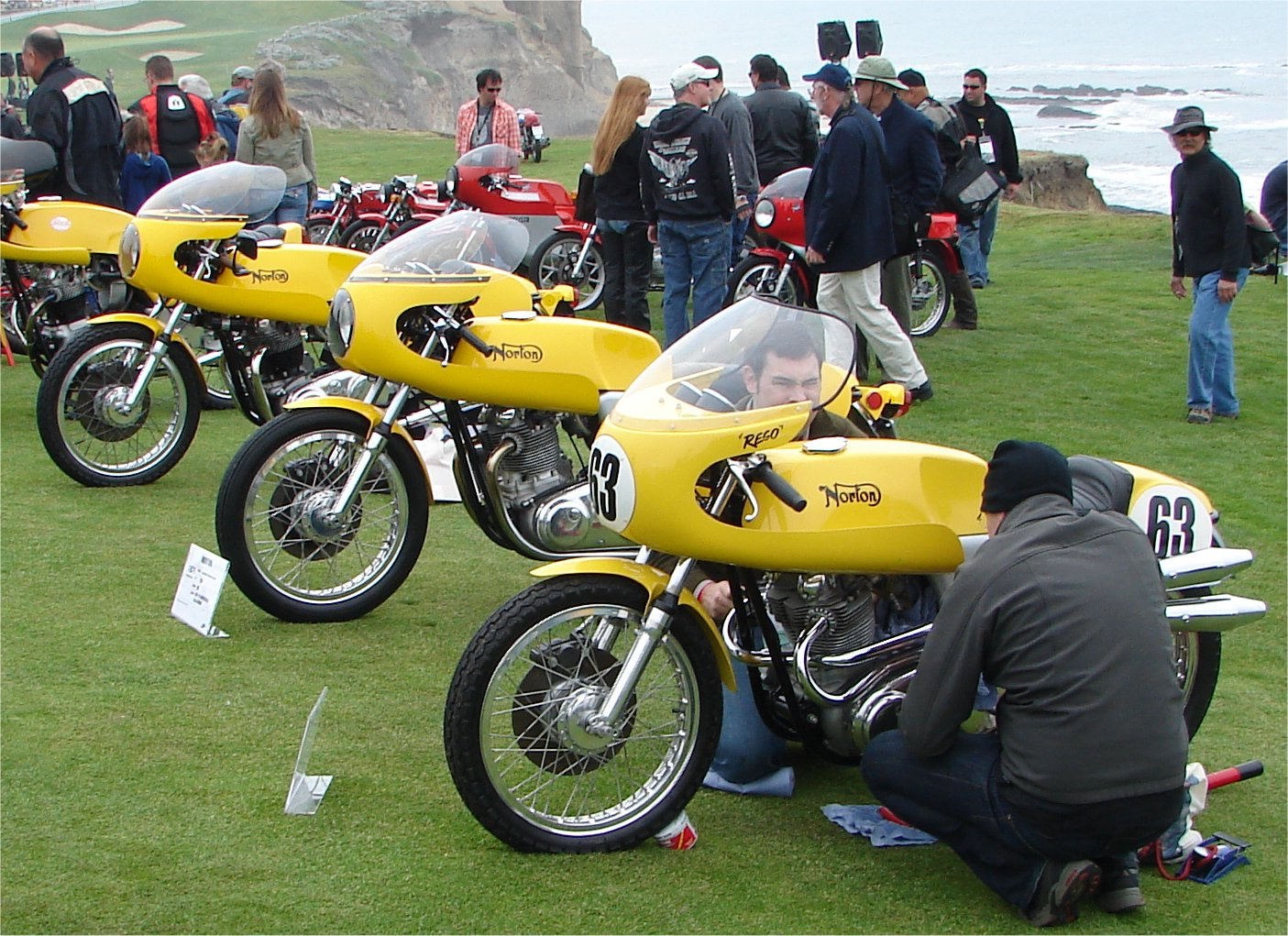
- Norton Commando Production Racers
- Manufacturer: Norton-Villiers
- Also called: Norton Commando PR
- Production: 1970-1972
- Assembly: Norton Villiers Performance Centre, Thruxton Circuit, Hampshire
- Engine: 745 cc (45.5 cu in) air-cooled OHV parallel-twin
- Top speed: 130 mph (210 km/h)
- Power: 66 bhp (49 kW) - 68 bhp (51 kW) @ 7,000 rpm
- Transmission: 4 or 5 speed, chain drive
- Wheelbase: 57 in (1,400 mm)
- Seat height: 29.5 in (750 mm)
- Weight: 406 lb (184 kg) (wet)
- Fuel capacity: 3.5 imp gal (16 L; 4.2 US gal)

The Norton Commando Production Racer was a hand built production racer produced by Norton-Villiers from 1970 - 1972. It was based on the road-going Norton Commando, and although fitted with lights it was never intended as a road bike. The model was commonly known as the Yellow Peril.

The exact number of PR machines produced is unknown, but estimates range from 119 to nearly 200.

== Background ==
The origins of the Norton Commando can be traced back to the late 1940s when the 497 cc (30.3 cu in) Norton Model 7 Twin was designed by Bert Hopwood. The twin-cylinder design evolved into 600 cc, then the 650 cc Manxman and Dominator until superseded by 750 cc Atlas before being launched as the 750 cc Commando in 1967.

The revolutionary part of the Commando, compared to earlier Norton models, was the award-winning frame developed by a team led by former Rolls-Royce engineer Dr. Stefan Bauer designed around a single 2.25 in (57 mm) top tube. The team to free the Commando from classic twin vibration problems and Bauer, with Norton-Villiers Chief Engineer Bernard Hooper and assistant Bob Trigg, decided that the engine, gearbox and swing-arm assembly were to be bolted together and isolated from the frame by special rubber mountings.

From its 1967 beginnings the Commando took part in racing events. After successes in 1969 by dealer-entered machines like Paul Smart's second and Mick Andrews' 4th places in the Isle of Man TT Production class and a win in the Hutchinson 100 Production Class by Mick Andrew on the Gus Kuhn entered Commando and 4th by Peter Williams' Arter Bros machine, the company decided to produce a production racing model, hence developed the Production Racer model.

== Technical ==
The PR was built at the Norton Villiers Performance Centre at the Thruxton Circuit from 1970 - 1972, mostly by former AJS rider and senior development engineer Peter Inchley. Two different variants of the PR were built:

The first variant was based on the 1969 Commando R model produced at the Plumstead, London factory. The Plumstead models had a twin-leading-shoe front drum brake and the "cigar" silencers that were carried over from the Atlas. The oil tank was exposed and painted grey. On the Plumstead models the points were located in a housing behind the timing case where the magneto had been mounted on the Atlas models. The rev-counter drive was taken from the front of the timing cover.

The second variant was based on the 1971 Commando Roadster. After production has moved from Plumstead to Wolverhampton, changes were made to the Commando. The points were moved to the front of the timing cover and the rev-counter drive moved to the centre of the engine. A disc brake was fitted at the front and upswept "peashooter" silencers fitted. A cover was fitted over the oil tank.

=== Engine and transmission ===
The engines were carefully hand assembled and blueprinted. Cylinder heads were individually chosen from stock castings and gas-flowed and squish bands machined into the combustion chambers. Larger inlet valves were fitted in phosphor-bronze valve guides and rockers polished. A 3S racing camshaft and shorter pushrods were used. Conrods were selected matching weights and high compression pistons fitted. Carburettors were stock size 32 mm Amal Concentrics, although Amal GP carbs could be fitted as an option. Boyer-Bransden electronic ignition could be fitted as an option. Power output was 66 bhp (49 kW) - 68 bhp (51 kW) @ 7,000 rpm .

The standard Commando diaphragm clutch was retained, driving a close ratio 4 speed gearbox. A 5 speed Quaife gearbox was available as an option.

=== Chassis ===
The frame was selected from production frames and checked for exact dimensions and trueness. Brackets for the fairing were welded and the brackets for the stands were removed. Custom yokes were fitted that adjusted the steering head angle. The forks were re-valved and fitted with shorter progressive springs. Early variants had the twin leading shoe front brake fitted with racing linings. This could be replaced with a single disc brake if required, which required new fork legs with lugs for the Lockheed calliper. Later variants used the disk front brake introduced to the production bikes in 1971. Testing had shown that a narrower front wheel improved lap times, and an alloy WM2 rim with a 360 x 19 tyre was fitted. Rear rim was an alloy WM3 item fitted to the standard hub. The standard rear brake with ventilation holes drilled in it was used.

A 3.5 imp gal (16 L; 4.2 US gal) alloy tank, a racing seat and a bikini fairing, all sprayed yellow, were fitted.

== Racing results ==
One of the first victories for the bike was at the 1970 Thruxton 500 with riders Charlie Sanby and Peter Williams. At that year's Isle of Man 750 Production TT, Williams came close to winning but ran out of petrol with sight of the finish line whilst leading. One of the first bikes was brought by an Italian team and on it their rider, Giuliano Ermanno, won the 1970 100 Miglia di Imola.

At the 1971 Isle of Man TT, Williams was third in the Formula 1 750 cc TT and set a new lap record of over 101mph in the 750 Production TT before retiring.
