= Norton Isolastic frame =

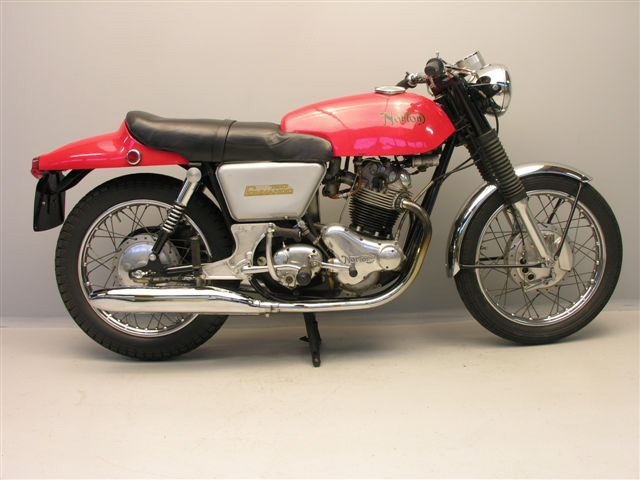
1969 750 cc Norton Commando 'Fastback'

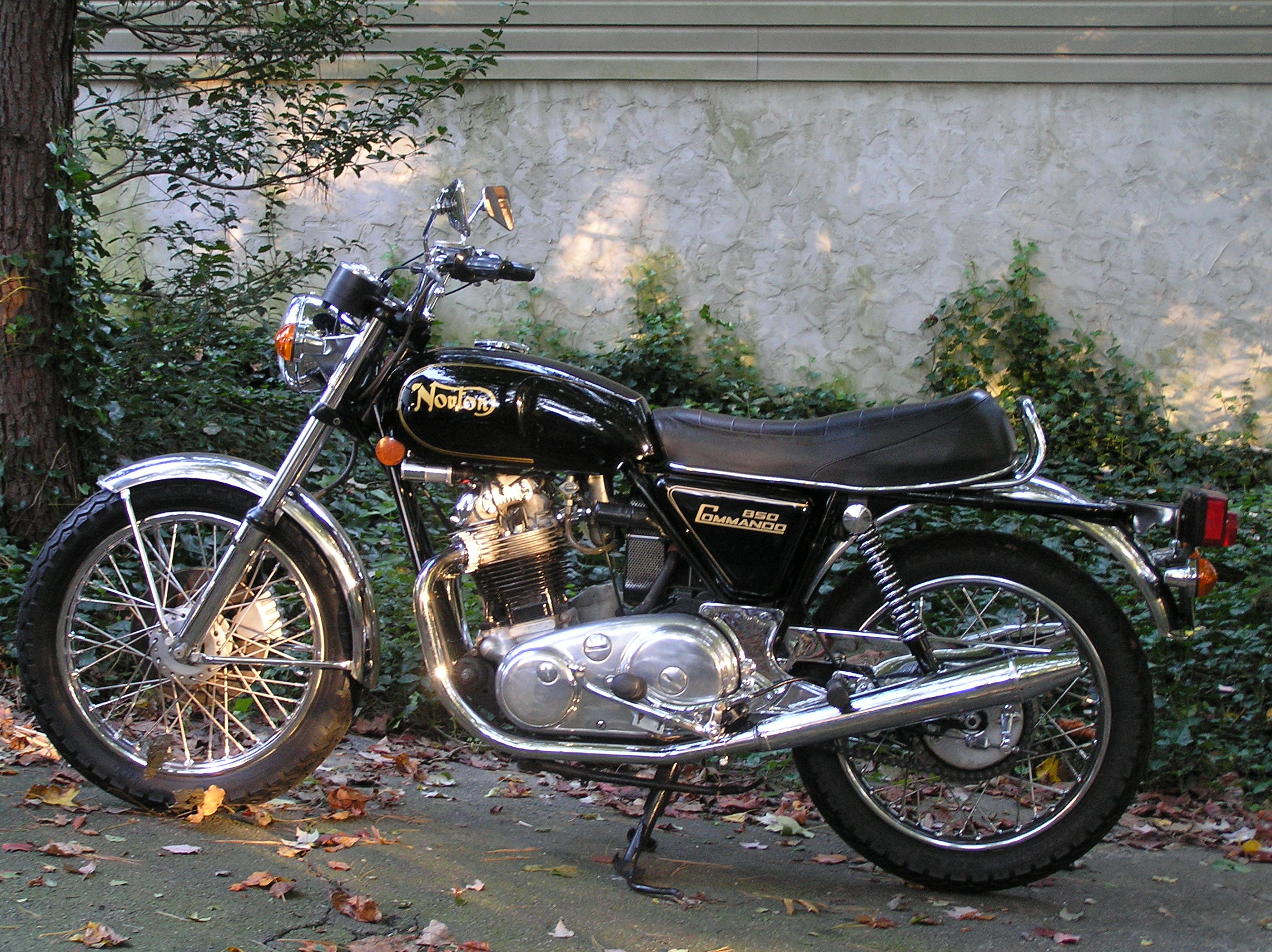
1973 850 cc Norton Commando with US-spec small fuel tank

The isolastic frame, designated by Norton as GlideRide, used a system of engine-to-frame mountings incorporating rubber bushes to isolate the vibration of the vertical twin engine from the frame and rider. The isolastic frame was developed for use with the Commando inclined engine, whilst the Featherbed frame continued in production for the Mercury with a softer-specification 650 cc vertical-engine until 1970.

== History ==
Following the collapse of the old Norton parent-company AMC in 1966, a new business was structured to produce motorcycles using the name Norton Matchless Division, under a new parent company name of Norton Villiers Ltd.

Part of the changes involved creating a new design frame produced as previously by Reynolds Tubes in Tyseley, Birmingham, England, where the traditional Featherbed frame had been produced since the 1950s, shipped for assembly at the Matchless works in Woolwich, London.

In an attempt to reduce the worsening problem of engine vibration being transmitted through the frame, as the capacity of the engine increased to 750cc with the Norton Atlas, Norton Villiers decided to replace the Featherbed frame for their top model, and the Norton Commando was the result, although Norton-Matchless machines like the P11 continued to use conventional Matchless frames.

The innovative new design isolastic frame made it smoother through the use of rubber bushes to isolate the engine and swingarm from the frame, forks, and rider. As the rubber bushes deteriorated, however, the bike became prone to fishtailing in high-speed turns. Earlier models therefore required careful maintenance and adjustment of the clearance between frame and mounts using shims.

Several improvements were made in 1969. The frame benefitted from additional stiffening and strengthening, which, together with an improved centre-stand, helped to improve ground-clearance which had been criticised. Slightly softer rubber mountings were introduced to reduce a vibration period at 1,500 to 1,900 rpm. A new model named Commando S was introduced with alternative styling having a different tank, mudguards and high-level exhausts.

The six-storey former Matchless factory at Woolwich closed on 25 July 1969, and production was transferred to a new, small, modern facility at Andover, Hampshire, when the range was expanded to five Commando variants—Fastback, Roadster SS, Production racer and Hi-Rider, all having "Isolastic Construction—Norton's revolutionary answer to vibration".

By 1971, the company name had changed again to Norton Villiers Europe Ltd. By 1973, a variant on the Roadster was introduced named Interstate, with larger 5 3/4-gallon (27 litre) fuel tank replacing the original US-specification 2 1/2 gallon (18 litre) capacity. By 1974 the company name had changed yet again, to Norton Triumph Europe Limited.

== Prototype models ==
As part of an attempt to produce new models from existing parts, NVT produced a few prototype models using the Isolastic engine mounting system. None of the prototypes made it into production.

=== Norton P92 ===
The P92 model comprised a BSA B50 engine in a BSA Fury/Triumph Bandit frame using Isolastic mountings from the Norton Commando. The US DOT had mandated that all motorcycles sold in the US should have a left hand gear change. The B50 had the gear lever on the right, so to comply with this requirement, the engine was tilted forward in the frame and a gear linkage run under the gearbox to provide a left hand gear change.

=== 900 Commando ===
A prototype '900 Commando' was also produced. It used a Triumph T180 triple engine (a T160 Trident engine increased in capacity to 870 cc) in Commando cycle parts.
