= Matchless G12 =

British motorcycle

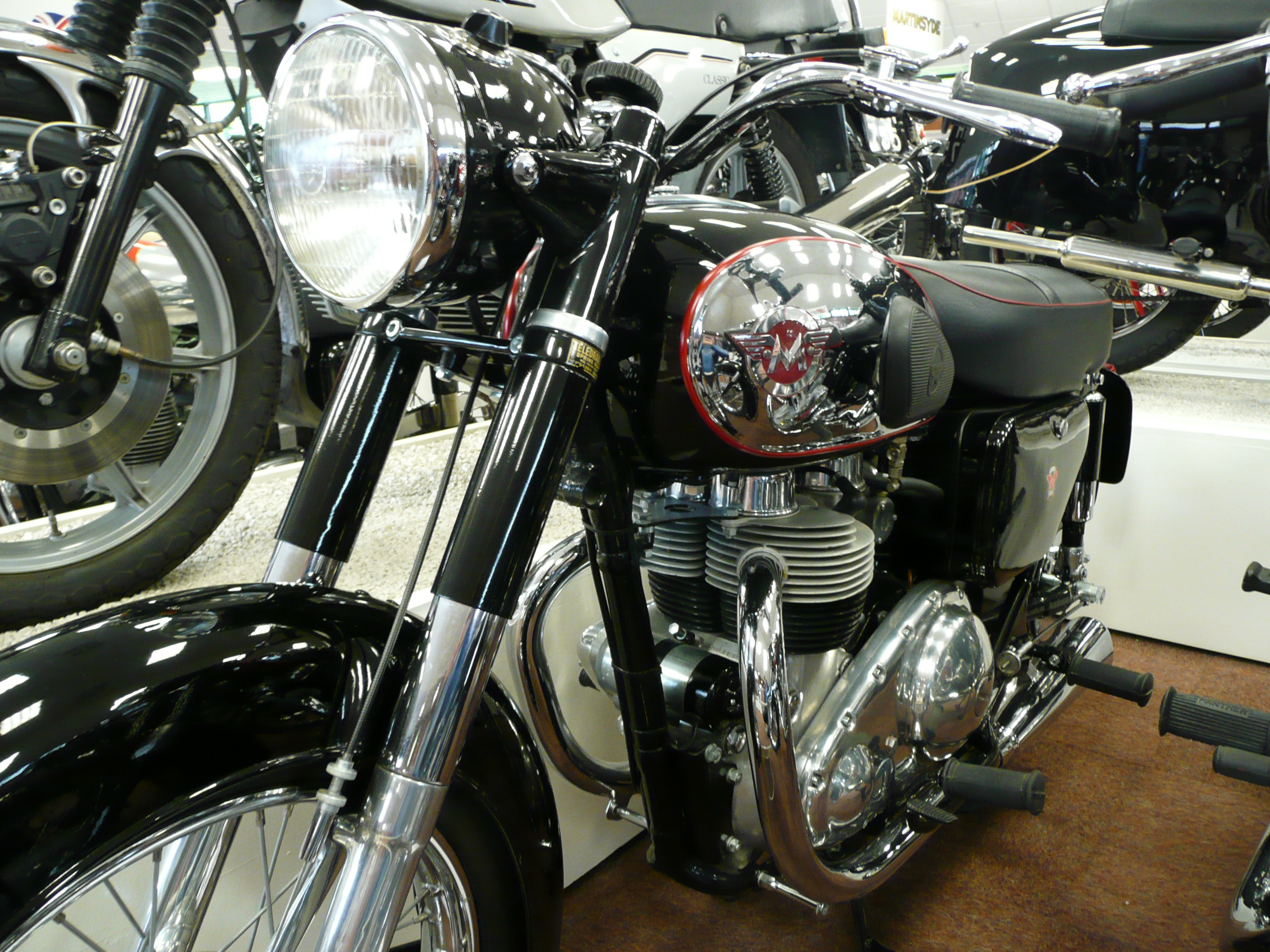
- Manufacturer: Associated Motor Cycles Plumstead, London
- Also called: 'Monarch'
- Production: 1958–66
- Predecessor: Matchless G11
- Engine: 646 cc (39 cu in) air-cooled twin
- Power: 35 bhp (26 kW) @ 6,500rpm
- Transmission: Four-speed gearbox to chain final drive
- Brakes: drum brakes
- Weight: 396 pounds (180 kg) (dry)

The Matchless G12 is a British motorcycle made by Associated Motor Cycles at the former Matchless factory in Plumstead, London. Developed in 1958 specifically to capture the potentially lucrative US market, the last G12 was produced in 1966.

== Development ==
=== Matchless G12 ===
The Matchless G12 was one of the last motorcycles designed under the Matchless name. It was also produced as the AJS Model 31 by the same company. Designed by Phil Walker, AMC knew that it had to be a 650 cc (39.7 cu in) but wanted to use as many parts from the Model 11 as possible. The cylinders could not be bored out further so the stroke was lengthened from 72.8 to 79.3 mm (2.87 to 3.12 in), resulting in a capacity of 646 cc (39.4 cu in). This meant developing a new crankshaft and primary chaincase, which also provided the opportunity to add a Lucas alternator. Volume production began in September 1958.

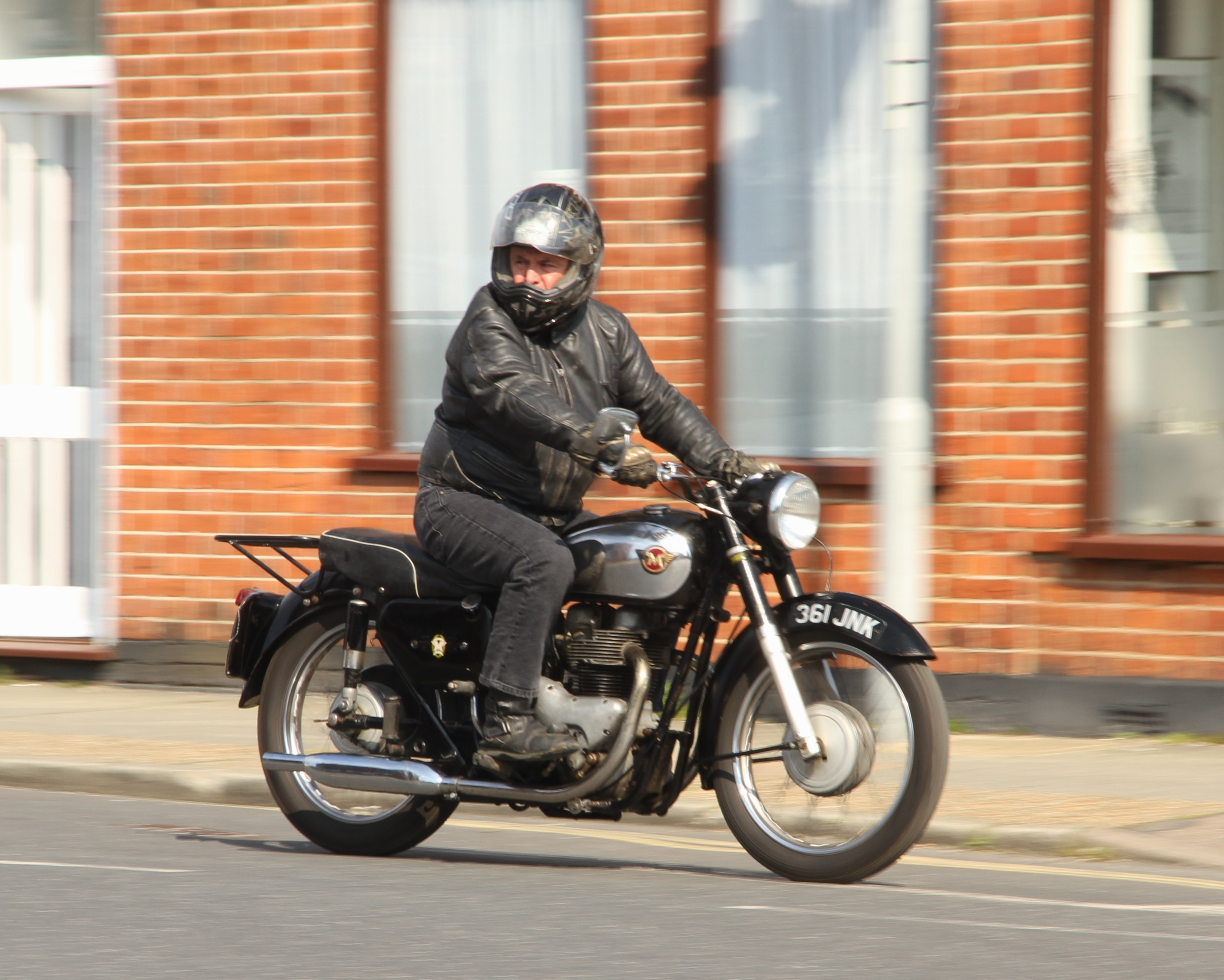
1960 Matchless G12 in use

=== Matchless G12 De Luxe ===
In 1959 the G12 was redesigned and modernised as the De Luxe with a new full cradle tubular duplex frame and a new cylinder head. Vibration had always been a problem, so the crankshaft was upgraded to nodular iron. Capable of 100 mph (160 km/h) performance, the G12 became popular with the American market.

=== Matchless G12 CS ===
The Matchless G12 CS (sometimes referred to as the CS X) was an off-road version of the Matchless G12 with improved ground clearance and a slightly upswept exhaust and an 8.5:1 compression ratio. It was not a trials competition machine but instead aimed at the 'desert racer' market in the US. While never as popular as rivals Triumph and BSA 650's in Open Class desert competition, the Matchless was powered by a torquey and reliable motor and was suspended with the superior Teledraulic front fork.

=== Matchless G12 CSR ===
The Matchless G12 CSR designation officially stood for "Competition Sprung Roadster," the same nomenclature used with the G80 and G50 models. It is mistakenly referenced as "Competition Sport Road". It was dubbed "Coffee Shop Racer" by its rivals. With its distinctive two-into-one "siamese" exhaust system and upgraded camshafts the CSR was a high-performance motorcycle with what was, at the time, a high compression ratio of 8.5:1, distinguishing it and the G12 CS from the other G12 models, which had a 7.5:1 compression ratio. The factory diverted Chief Engineer Jack Williams from AJS 7R development to address the problems with leaks and vibration and modify the bikes for racing, with the result that Ron Langston and Don Chapman won the prestigious Thruxton 500 long-distance endurance race on the AJS Model 31 counterpart to the G12. Encouraged by this victory, in 1963 Matchless named the G12 CSR "Monarch" in ("Apache" in the US) and twin carburettors. the AJS version was renamed the "Hurricane".

=== Matchless G15/45 ===
In 1964 the CSR gained Norton brakes and forks, and the following year a Norton Atlas 750 cc (45.8 cu in) engine replaced the trouble-prone AMC unit. In 1962 and 1963, AMC had produced a limited run of 212 touring motorcycles of 738 cc (45.0 cu in) displacement using an enlarged version of the G12 AMC-designed engine, but these bikes – which were given the model designation "G15/45" – proved even less reliable than the 650 cc (39.7 cu in) version when ridden hard. So AMC abandoned its plan to develop a 750 cc desert racer version. However, when examples of the rare G15/45 are found, they often have achieved similar mileages to the G12 on which they are based. The styling and colour schemes may be equally to blame for the lack of commercial success. If successful, this could have saved the company, as there was a huge demand in the US for powerful desert racers to compete in endurance events. By this time the company were in financial trouble and production ended in 1966.

Some success was achieved with 750cc Norton Atlas-engined models. These were the Matchless G15CS/M, G15CS/N, G15Mk2, G15P, G1533, G15CS, N15CS and G15CSR; AJS Model 33CSR; and Norton P11 (Cheetah), P11A, and Ranger 750. Around 10,000 were sold in total, more than the number of Norton Atlas. The CS "street scramblers" were competitive and 4,500 were built. The Project 11 (P11) models won the 1969 World championship before the European two-strokes arrived, and 2,500 were sold.

== See also ==
- List of motorcycles of the 1950s
