= AJS Model 20 =

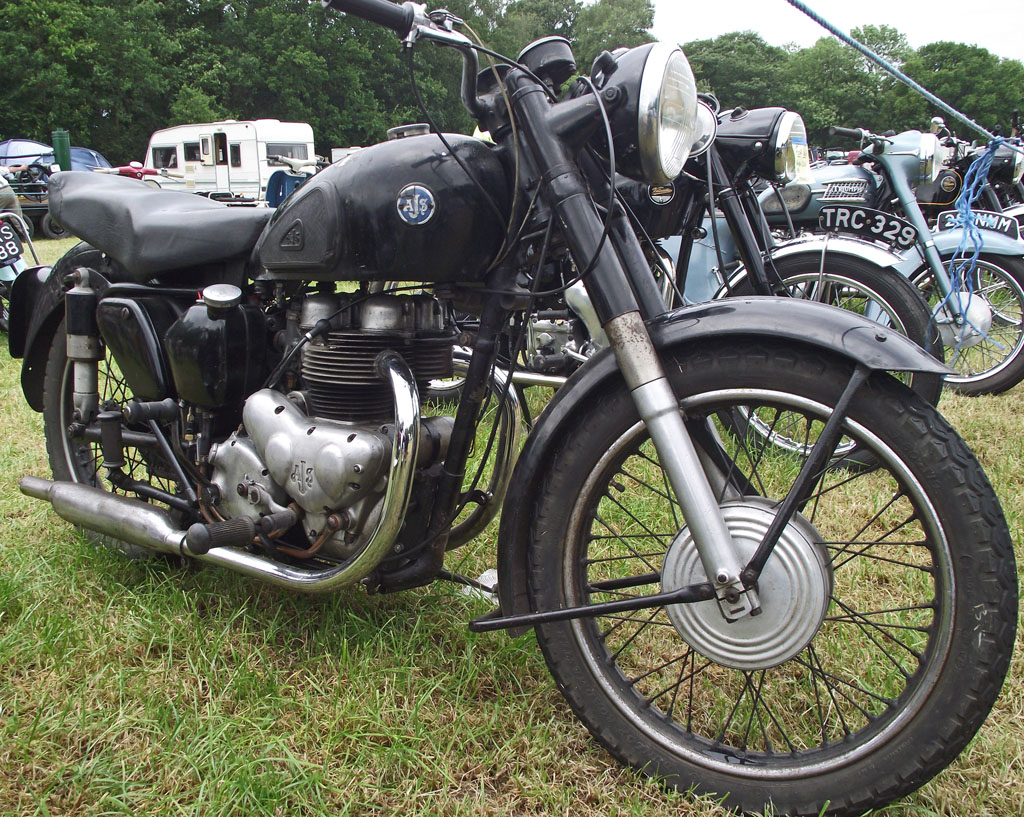
- Manufacturer: Associated Motorcycles Plumstead, London
- Production: 1948–1958
- Successor: AJS Model 31
- Engine: 498 cc air cooled twin
- Top speed: 85 mph (137 km/h)
- Transmission: Four speed gearbox to chain final drive
- Suspension: Teledraulic front fork, swinging arm rear
- Brakes: drum brakes
- Weight: 395 lb (179 kg) (dry)

The AJS Model 20 is a British motorcycle that was made by Associated Motorcycles at the former Matchless factory in Plumstead, London. The Model 20 was discontinued when the 646 cc AJS Model 31 was introduced in the autumn of 1958.

== Development ==
The AJS Model 20 and corresponding Matchless G9 were launched at the Earl's Court motorcycle show in late 1948. At first for export to the US, it was not until late in the summer of 1949 that AJS first offered the Model 20 on the home market. From the beginning, it had a "Teledraulic" telescopic front fork, swinging arm rear suspension, dual seat, and "megaphone" silencers. The G9 was called the "Super Clubman", and the AJS Model 20 was called the "Spring Twin". The basic design changed little over the course of the next few years. The most significant change was made in 1952, when a new Burman gearbox was adopted.

In 1951, the rear suspension was upgraded to the "Jampot" unit, derided for its shape in the 28 September issue of The Motor Cycle. In the same year, minor changes included a new Lucas horn-push on the handlebar and a medallion badge in place of the previously used transfer. Front fork shuttle damping was also replaced with rod and damper-type.

The Model 20 was discontinued when the 646cc AJS Model 31 replaced it in the autumn of 1958.

== See also ==
- List of motorcycles of the 1940s
- List of motorcycles of the 1950s
