= Norton Interpol =

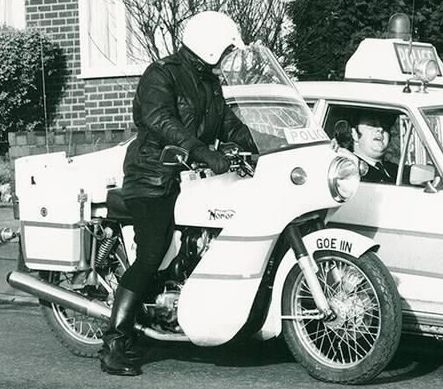
- West Midlands Police 1974 or '75 Norton Interpol beside a patrol car
- Manufacturer: Norton-Villiers
- Predecessor: Norton Atlas Police model
- Engine: 745 and 828 cc (45.5 and 50.5 cu in) air-cooled OHV parallel-twin
- Transmission: Wet clutch, 4-speed, chain drive
- Related: Norton Commando

The Norton Interpol was a police motorcycle produced by the British manufacturer Norton between 1969 and 1976. The Interpol was based on the company's Commando model. The 'Interpol' name was retained for Norton's later Norton Interpol 2 rotary engined police motorcycle.

== Background ==
Some police forces had expressed interest in the Commando. Norton's chairman, Dennis Poore, recruited Neale Shilton, who had just left Triumph to produce a Commando to police specifications. Shilton had been responsible for the success of the Triumph Saint amongst police forces and as Fleet Sales Manager had made many contacts within various police forces. The result was the 'Interpol' machine, which sold well to police forces, both at home and abroad. The 750 cc machine was fitted with panniers, top box, fairing, radio mountings, police lights, and auxiliary equipment.

== Timeline ==
The machine was first exhibited at the 1969 Brighton Bike Show and was fitted with an Avon fairing with a blue light and Craven panniers. The tank was derived from the Atlas, but with a modified underside to clear the Commando's top frame tube, and a single seat. Shilton took the bike around the UK demonstrating it to the various police forces. Once production started, the basic machine was assembled in the factory and the accessories such as fairings and panniers were fitted off-site. The exact specification varied dependent on the individual forces' requirement. A disc front brake was offered as an option from 1971 and make standard in 1972. Fitment of this required new handlebars so the master cylinder cleared the fairing. Reverse cone silencers were fitted in 1972, but not upswept like other models in the Commando range so as to give room for the panniers. The larger Interstate tank was fitted from 1972

Most Interpols were finished in white, but some were supplied in dark blue or black and without fairings to be used as 'unmarked' vehicles.

When Norton's parent company Norton Villiers Triumph (NVT) hit financial trouble in 1975 Shilton left Norton and joined BMW. In his new position Shilton helped BMW take over the UK police motorcycle market. Many of the accessories used on the Interpol, such as the fairing and top box, were carried over to the BMW police bikes.

== Tanks and radios ==
Police radios were usually fitted to the petrol tank. There was no standard police radio with different forces using different radios. The radios were expensive and were reused when a new bike was brought, leading to a multitude of fitting requirements for the radio. The tank from the previous police version of the Atlas was carried over, with a modified underside to overcome the differences between the Atlas and Commando frames. Four variant were available: plain, with a radio recess, with screwed inserts or with pommels. (The bike exhibited at the Brighton Bike show had a recessed tank with a Cossar radio, with although obsolete was still in common use).

The Lancashire Constabulary were one of the largest forces in England at the time. They pioneered moving the radio from the tank to a rear box behind the rider. When the 5 imp gal (23 L; 6.0 US gal) Interstate tank was introduced in 1972 to give the bikes a longer range, this added further reasoning to use a rear mounted radio. The Pye Westminster was introduced in 1967 and became available in various car and motorcycle configurations as well as offering more features and channels. It was also lighter and smaller than its predecessors. The Westminster eventually became the most used police radio.

== 1975 Saudi Arabia order ==
Shilton travelled to Riyadh in March 1975 with the intention of selling Interpols to Saudi's Minister of Defence Prince Aziz. Shilton impressed Prince Aziz at a military tattoo by riding past the royal enclosure on an Interpol with the lights flashing and siren sounding with Shilton standing to attention on the footrests and giving an eyes right salute as he passed. A deal worth £1 million was agreed to supply nearly 600 bikes.

By the summer of '75 Norton Villiers Triumph were liquidation and the Wolverhampton factory where the Commando was made was occupied with workers staging a sit-in. The former BSA factory at Small Heath was producing a final run of the Triumph Trident T160 of 288 bikes for Australia and 224 for the US. These bikes were transferred to the Saudi order and the bikes converted to a police specification with Norton badges.

The Tridents were unreliable in Saudi Arabia and the final consignment of 130 bikes was cancelled. These bikes were sold off as the Triumph Cardinal in 1977.
