= List of AMC motorcycles =

This is a partial list of motorcycle models produced by the Associated Motor Cycles (AMC) from its foundation in 1938 to incorporations as Norton-Villiers-Triumph. Many models were produced to the same specification under the badge names of AJS and Matchless.

== AJS and Matchless model list ==
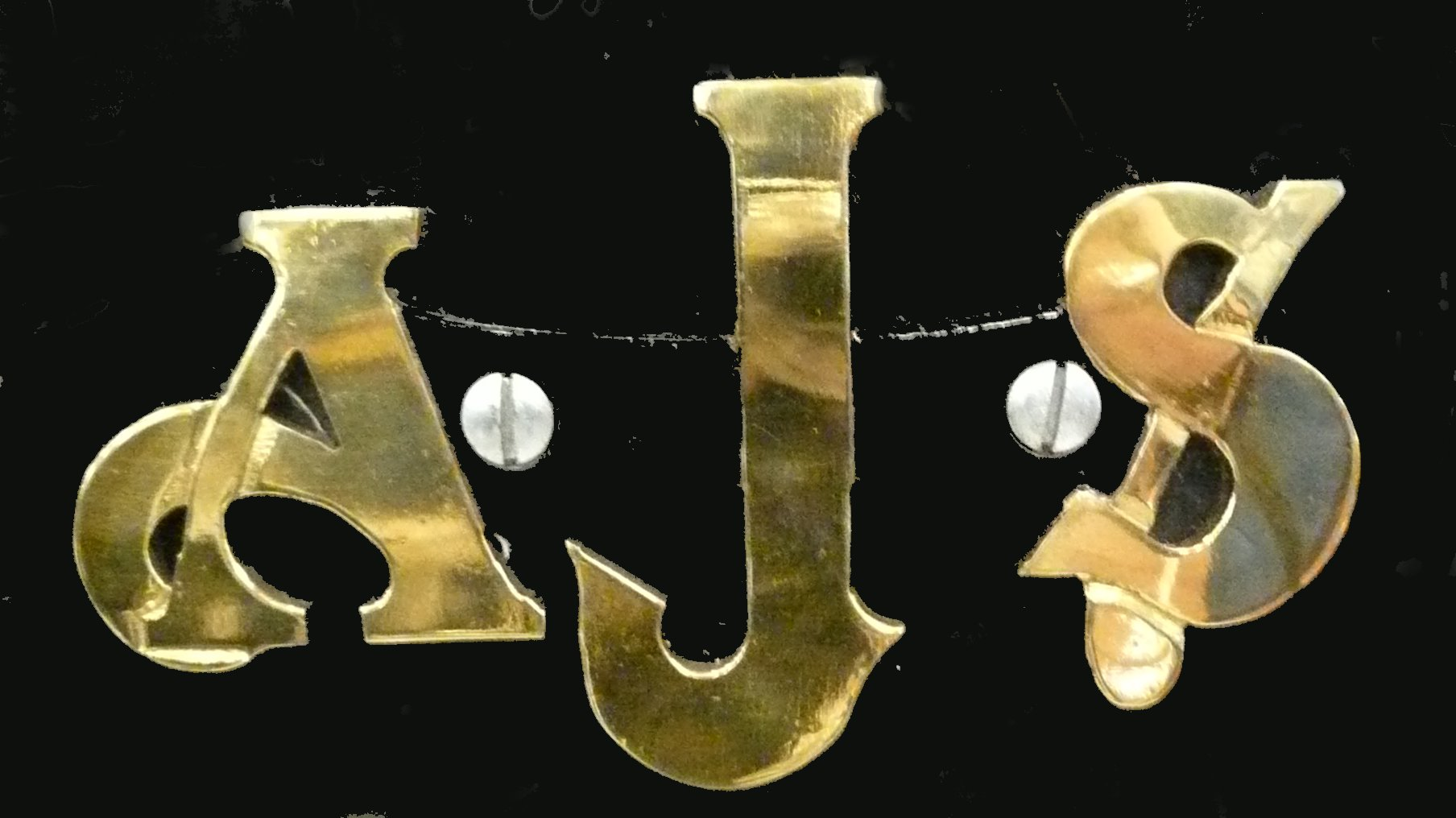

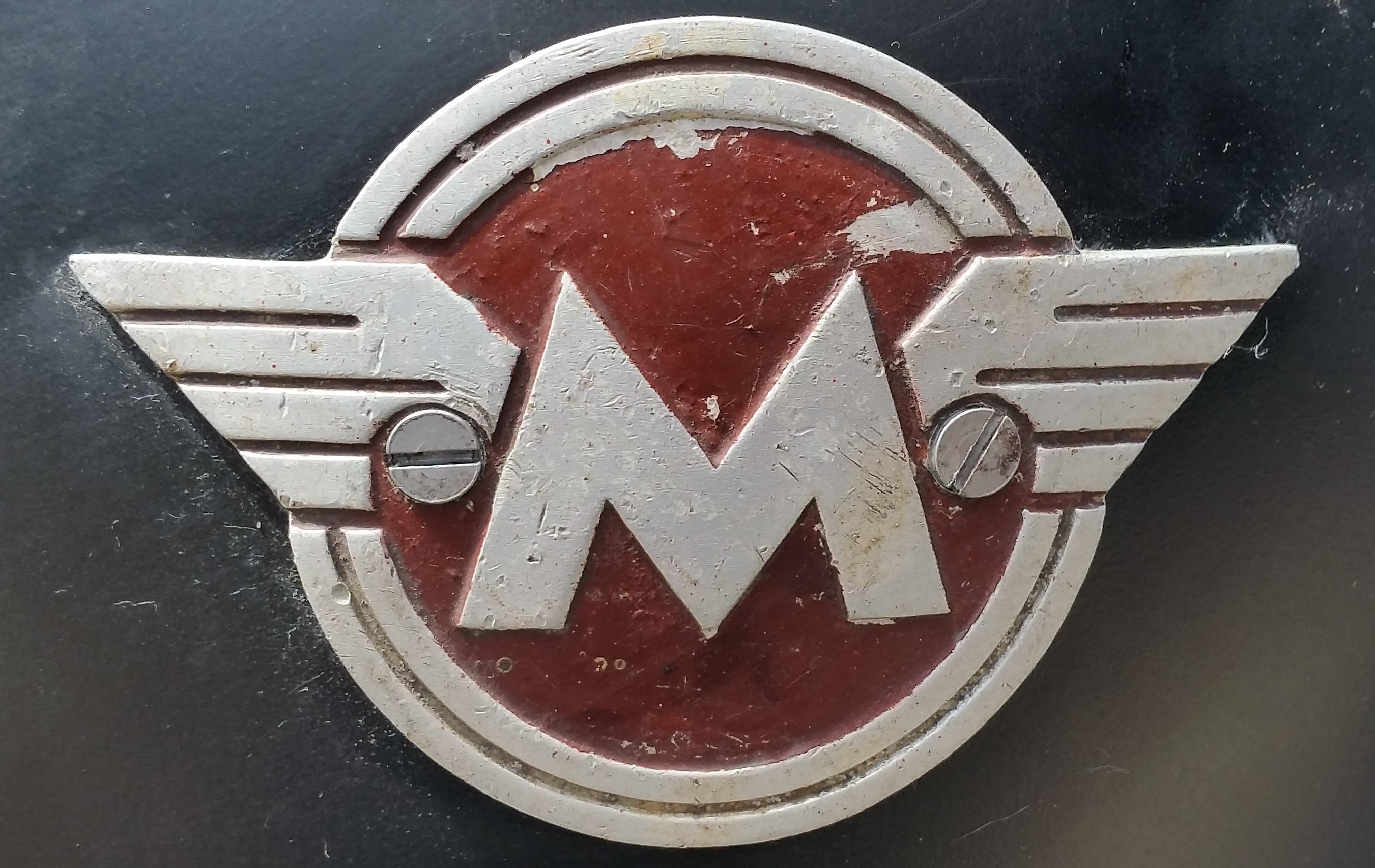
Matchless Tank Badge from a 1959 Matchless

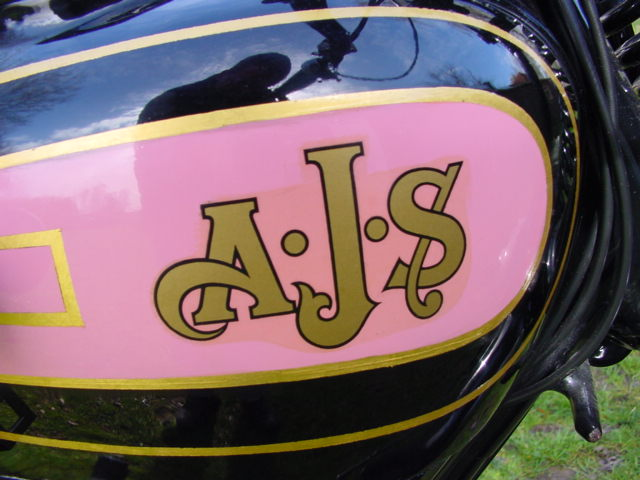

Year	AJS	Matchless	cc
1940		G3 (ex-WD)	348
1941–44		G3 (ex-WD)	348
1945		G3 (ex-WD)	348
1945	16M	G3L	348
1945	18	G80	497
1946	16M	G3L	348
1947	16MC	G3LC	348
1947	18	G80	497
1947	18C	G80C	497
1948	16M	G3L	348
1948	16MC	G3LC	348
1948	16MS	G3LS	348
1948	18	G80	497
1948	18C	G80C	497
1949	16M	G3L	348
1949	16MC	G3LC	348
1949	16MS	G3LS	348
1949	18	G80	497
1949	18C	G80C	497
1949	18S	G80S	497
1949	20	G9	498
1950	16M	G3L	348
1950	16MC	G3LC	348
1950	16MS	G3LS	348
1950	18	G80	497
1950	18C	G80C	497
1950	18S	G80S	497
1950	20	G9	498
1951–52	16M	G3L	348
1951–52	16MC	G3LC	348
1951–52	16MCS	G3LCS	348
1951–52	16MS	G3LS	348
1951–52	18	G80	497
1951–52	18C	G80C	497
1951–52	18CS	G80CS	497
1951–52	18S	G80S	497
1951–52	20	G9	498
1953	16M	G3L	348
1953	16MC	G3LC	348
1953	16MCS	G3LCS	348
1953	16MS	G3LS	348
1953	18	G80	497
1953	18C	G80C	497
1953	18CS	G80CS	497
1953	18S	G80S	497
1953	20	G9	498
1954	16M	G3L	348
1954	16MC	G3LC	348
1954	16MCS	G3LCS	348
1954	16MS	G3LS	348
1954	18	G80	497
1954	18C	G80C	497
1954	18CS	G80CS	497
1954	18S	G80S	497
1954	20	G9	498
1955	16M	G3L	348
1955	16MC	G3LC	348
1955		G3LCS	348
1955	16MS	G3LS	348
1955	18	G80	497
1955	18C	G80C	497
1955	18CS	G80CS	497
1955	18S	G80S	497
1955	20	G9	498
1956	16MCS	G3LCS	348
1956	16MCT	G3LCT	348
1956	16MS	G3LS	348
1956	18	G80	497
1956	18C	G80C	497
1956	18CS	G80CS	497
1956	18S	G80S	497
1956	20	G9	498
1956	30	G11	593
1957	16MCS	G3LCS	348
1957	16MCT	G3LCT	348
1957	16MS	G3LS	348
1957	18	G80	497
1957	18C	G80C	497
1957	18CS	G80CS	497
1957		G80R	497
1957	18S	G80S	497
1957	30	G11	593
1957	20	G9	498
1958	14	G2	248
1958	16MCS	G3LCS	348
1958	16MCT	G3LCT	348
1958	16MS	G3LS	348
1958	18	G80	497
1958	18C	G80C	497
1958	18CS	G80CS	497
1958		G80R	497
1958	18S	G80S	497
1958	30	G11	593
1958	30CS	G11CS	593
1958	30CSR	G11CSR	593
1958	20	G9	498
1959	14	G2	248
1959	14CS	G2CS	248
1959	16	G3	348
1959	16C	G3C	348
1959	16CS	G3CS	348
1959	18	G80	497
1959	18CS	G80CS	497
1959		G80R	497
1959	30	G11	593
1959	31	G12	646
1959	31 DeLuxe	G12 DeLuxe	646
1959	31CS	G12CS	646
1959	31CSR	G12CSR	646
1959	20 DeLuxe	G9 DeLuxe	498
1959	20 Standard	G9 Standard	498
1959	20CS	G9CS	498
1959	20CSR	G9CSR	498
1960	14	G2	498

== See also ==
- List of Ariel motorcycles
- List of BSA motorcycles
- List of Triumph motorcycles
- List of Norton motorcycles
- List of Royal Enfield motorcycles
- List of Velocette motorcycles
- List of Vincent motorcycles
