= Matchless G9 =

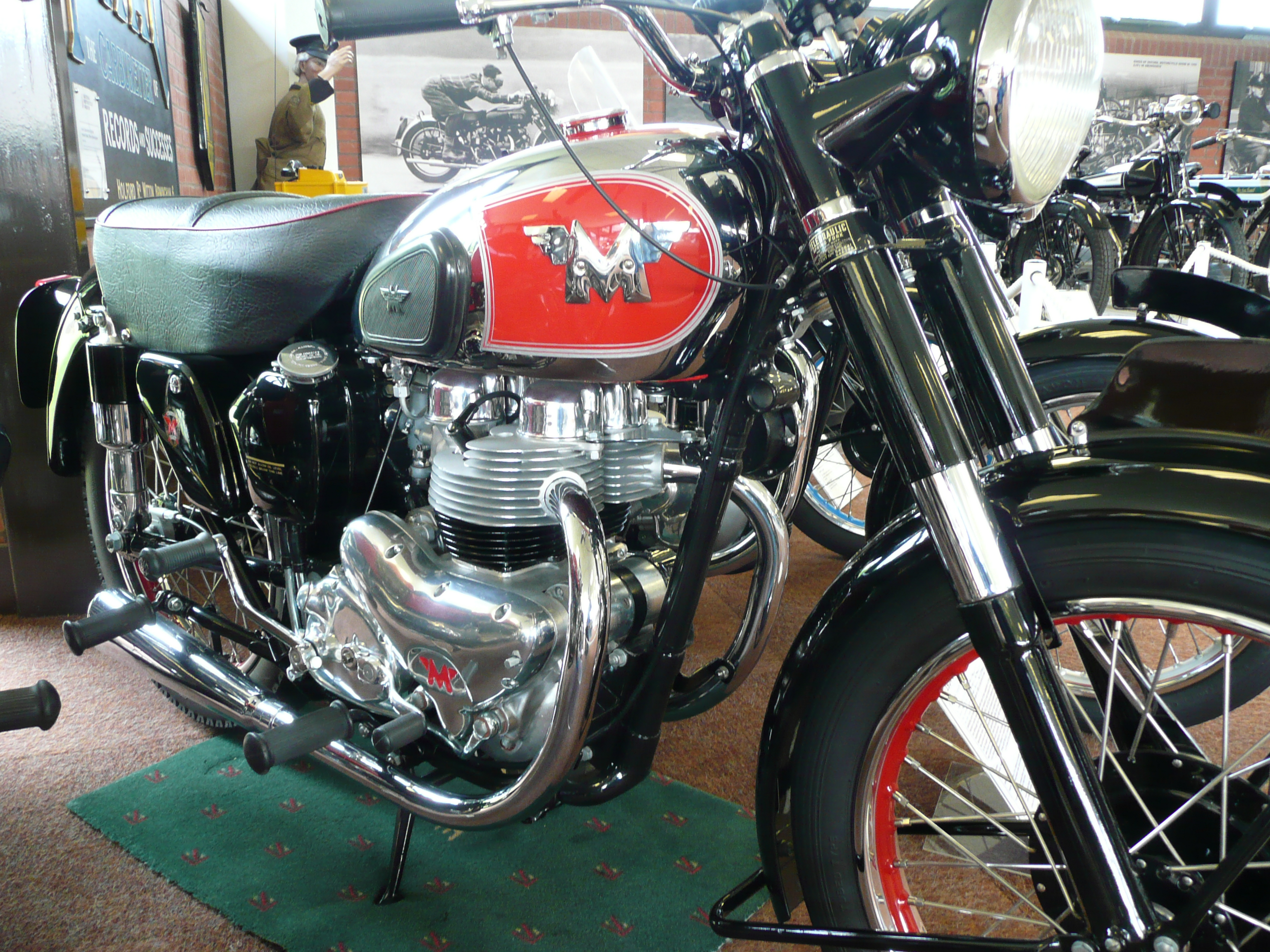
- Manufacturer: Associated Motorcycles Plumstead, London
- Production: 1948–1958
- Successor: G12
- Engine: 498 cc air cooled twin
- Top speed: 85 mph
- Transmission: Four-speed gearbox to chain final drive
- Suspension: Teledraulic front fork, swinging arm rear
- Brakes: Drum brakes
- Weight: 395 pounds (179 kg) (dry)

The Matchless G9 is a British motorcycle that was made by Associated Motorcycles at the Matchless factory in Plumstead, London. The G9 was discontinued in 1961.

== Development ==
The Matchless G9 and corresponding AJS Model 20 were launched at the Earls Court motorcycle show in late 1948. At first exclusively for export to the US, it was not until late in the summer of 1949 that Matchless first offered the G9 on the home market. From the beginning, it had a "Teledraulic" telescopic front fork, swinging arm rear suspension, dual seat, and "megaphone" silencers. The G9 was called the "Super Clubman", and the AJS Model 20 was called the "Spring Twin". The basic design changed little over the course of the next few years. The most significant change was made in 1952, when a new Burman gearbox was adopted.

In 1951, the rear suspension was upgraded to the "Jampot" unit, derided for its shape in the 28 September issue of The Motor Cycle. In the same year, minor changes included a new Lucas horn-push on the handlebar and a medallion badge in place of the previously used transfer. Front fork shuttle damping was also replaced with rod and damper-type.

The G9 was discontinued in 1961.
