= G12 =

G12 may refer to:

== Vehicles ==
- EMD G12, an American diesel locomotive
- Fiat G.12, an Italian transport aircraft
- HMS G12, a Royal Navy G-class submarine
- HMS Saumarez (G12), a Royal Navy S-class destroyer
- Matchless G12, a British motorcycle
- Prussian G 12, a Prussian steam locomotive
- SMS G12, a German V1-class torpedo boat

== People ==
- "G12", a nickname for basketball player Ja Morant

== Other uses ==
- G12 (postcode), covering most of the West End of Glasgow
- G-12 (Brazilian football), a group of Brazilian football clubs
- G12 Hunchun–Ulanhot Expressway in China
- G12 Vision, a Colombian Christian movement
- Canon PowerShot G12, a digital camera
- County Route G12 (California)
- Group of Twelve, an intergovernmental organization
