= Norton-Villiers =

British motorcycle manufacturer

- Industry: Motorcycles
- Founded: 1966
- Defunct: 1972
- Fate: Merger
- Successor: Norton-Villiers-Triumph

Norton-Villiers was a British motorcycle manufacturer formed in the 1960s following the collapse of AMC. During the general decline of the British motorcycle industry, a British Government initiative combined it with the remnants of BSA Triumph to form Norton-Villiers-Triumph.

== Norton Villiers (1966–1973) ==
In 1966, AMC went bankrupt and were taken over by Manganese Bronze Holdings which formed Norton-Villiers to oversee operations. At the time Norton was the only motorcycle marque in the company that was making money. The AJS and Matchless traditional single cylinder four-stroke models ceased production. Matchless and AJS badged models equipped with Norton engines continued to be assembled until 1969. In 1968, all models were updated with new carburettors, ignition systems, and an ignition lock. The G15CS, N15CS, and M33CS models featured improved cycle components during the 1968–1969 production years.

The P11 series was a completely new development for 1967 and was further developed for 1968–69. The P11 was available either as Norton or Matchless.

In 2020, Indian automobile manufacturer TVS Motor Company acquired Norton Villiers.

In April 2022, parent company TVS Motor announced an investment of £100 million into Norton Motorcycles to support the development of a new manufacturing facility in Solihull and the engineering of future electric and internal combustion models.

=== Norton Commando ===
For Norton-Villiers the development of a new engine to market was cost-prohibitive, but the vibration of the 750 cc vertical twin was so well transmitted to the rider through the Featherbed frame of the Norton Atlas, that it was dropped in favour of an earlier experimental frame (based on a concept bike designated P10, and later Z26 as an improvement) that separated the engine from the frame with rubber bushes, creating a more rider-friendly experience.

The Norton Isolastic frame was developed in time for the 1967 Earls CourtShow. Production began in April 1968, but bending problems with the frame resulted in a more-developed frame being introduced in January 1969.

The Norton Commando promptly turned up in racing events, amongst the first being London dealer Vincent Davey running a team under the Gus Kuhn name with riders Dave Croxford and Mick Andrew.

The 1969 Commando S was introduced fitted with a high-level left-side exhaust and a 2.5-imperial-gallon (11 L) petrol tank, primarily aimed at the export (US) market. The original model was thereafter referred to as the Commando Fastback.

== Manufacture ==
In late 1968, the Plumstead works at Burrage Grove, where engines from the Wolverhampton plant and frames from the Manchester plant were assembled into complete machines, were presented with a Greater London Council compulsory purchase order. The Plumstead works closed in July 1969.

A Government subsidy allowed assembly to move to a factory at North Way, Andover, with an aircraft hangar on nearby Thruxton Airfield housing the Test Department. Manufacturing was concentrated at Wolverhampton, in the former Villiers factory, with 80 complete machines produced there each week. Wolverhampton also shipped components, assembled engines, and gearboxes to the Andover assembly line.

== NV Motorcycle models ==
- Neale Shilton designed a Commando to police specifications, the Norton Interpol. It had panniers, top box, fairing, and fittings for auxiliary electrical equipment
- March 1970, Roadster
- June 1970, Commando S discontinued
- September 1970, Fastback MK. 2, soon replaced by the Fastback Mk.3
- May 1971, Street Scrambler and the Hi Rider
- July 1971 Fastback Long Range
- January 1972 Mk.4 Fastback, an updated Roadster, and the 750 Interstate, with Combat engines.

=== Combat engine ===
The high performance Combat engine gave 65 bhp (48 kW) at 6,500 rpm using 10 :1 compression ratio. It was too much for the stretched old 1948 Model 7 497 cc-based design, with main bearing failures and broken pistons being reported in the press, along with quality control issues. The solution to the main bearing problems were the bearings designated "Superblend" by Norton in a 1972 Service Release. These bearings were a 'special' with additional crowning, marked 6/MRJA30 and made by R&M (later RHP). Early in 1973 a superseding service release referred to Extra High Capacity Main Bearings. These were in reality just a higher load capacity roller bearing NJ306E made by FAG. The piston issues were resolved by removing the slot for oil drainage behind the oil ring, and drilling a series of holes instead, so that the piston crown didn't separate from the piston at higher RPMs.

== Forced merger ==
This brought a deterioration in finances. By the middle of 1972, the BSA group was in serious financial trouble as a result of its BSA and Triumph motorcycle activities. The government offered a financial rescue package contingent on a merger of the two groups and Norton-Villiers-Triumph was born.

== Sources ==
Motorcycle History (retrieved 21 October 2006)
