= 1955 Southern 100 Races =

The 1955 Southern 100 was a race which was on 14th July around the 4.25 mile Billown Course in the Isle Of Man.

== Race results ==
=== Race 1; 1955 Southern 100 Junior 350cc Race final standings. ===
July 1955 Billown Circuit 12 laps – 51 miles (81.13 km)

Rank	Rider	Team	Speed	Time
1	(Isle of Man) Derek Ennett	350cc AJS	76.79 mph	39' 51.27
2	(England) Dave Chadwick	350cc Norton	76.75 mph	39' 51.87
3	(England) Dennis Pratt	350cc BSA	—	+1 lap
4	(Isle of Man) Dennis Christian	350cc BSA	—	+1 lap
5	(England) Edward Hunt	350cc Velocette	—	+1 lap
6	(England) P.H.Beighton	350cc AJS	—	+1 lap
7	(England) V.L.Green	350cc AJS		
8	(England) John Holder	350cc BSA		
9	(England) D.E.Burns	350cc BSA		
10	(England) T.H.Anyon	350cc BSA		

=== Race 2; 1955 Southern 100 Lightweight 250cc Race final standings. ===
July 1955 Billown Circuit 6 laps – 25.50 miles (41.06 km)

Rank	Rider	Team	Speed	Time
1	(England) Dave Chadwick	250cc RDS	65.50 mph	23' 21.0
2	(England) John Patrick	250cc Velocette	63.70 mph	24' 00.0
3	(England) Frank Cope	250cc Norton	63.26 mph	24' 11.0
4	(England) Dougie Rose	250cc Velocette	61.30 mph	24' 57.0
5	(England) Syd Mizen	250cc Francis-Barnett	58.80 mph	26' 01.0
6	(England) K.R.E.Prince	250cc Francis Barnett	—	+1 lap
7	(England) D.Rumble	250cc CTS	—	+1 lap

=== Race 3; 1955 Southern 100 Solo Championship 500cc Race final standings. ===
July 1955 Billown Circuit 24 laps – 102 miles (164.25 km)

Rank	Rider	Team	Speed	Time
1	(England) Terry Shepherd	500cc Norton	78.26 mph	1:18.11.8
2	(Scotland) Alastair King	500cc Norton	75.50 mph	1:21.01.0
3	(Isle of Man) Derek Ennett	500cc Matchless	75.20 mph	1:24.21.4
4	(Isle of Man) Jack Wood	500cc BSA	—	+1 lap
5	(England) Brian Duffy	500cc Norton	—	+1 lap
6	(Isle of Man) Eddie Crooks	500cc Matchless	—	+2 laps
7	(England) V.L.Green	500cc AJS		
8	(England) John Holder	500cc BSA		
9	(England) P.H.Beighton	500c AJS		
10	(England) D.E.Burns	500cc BSA		
