= Norton P11 =

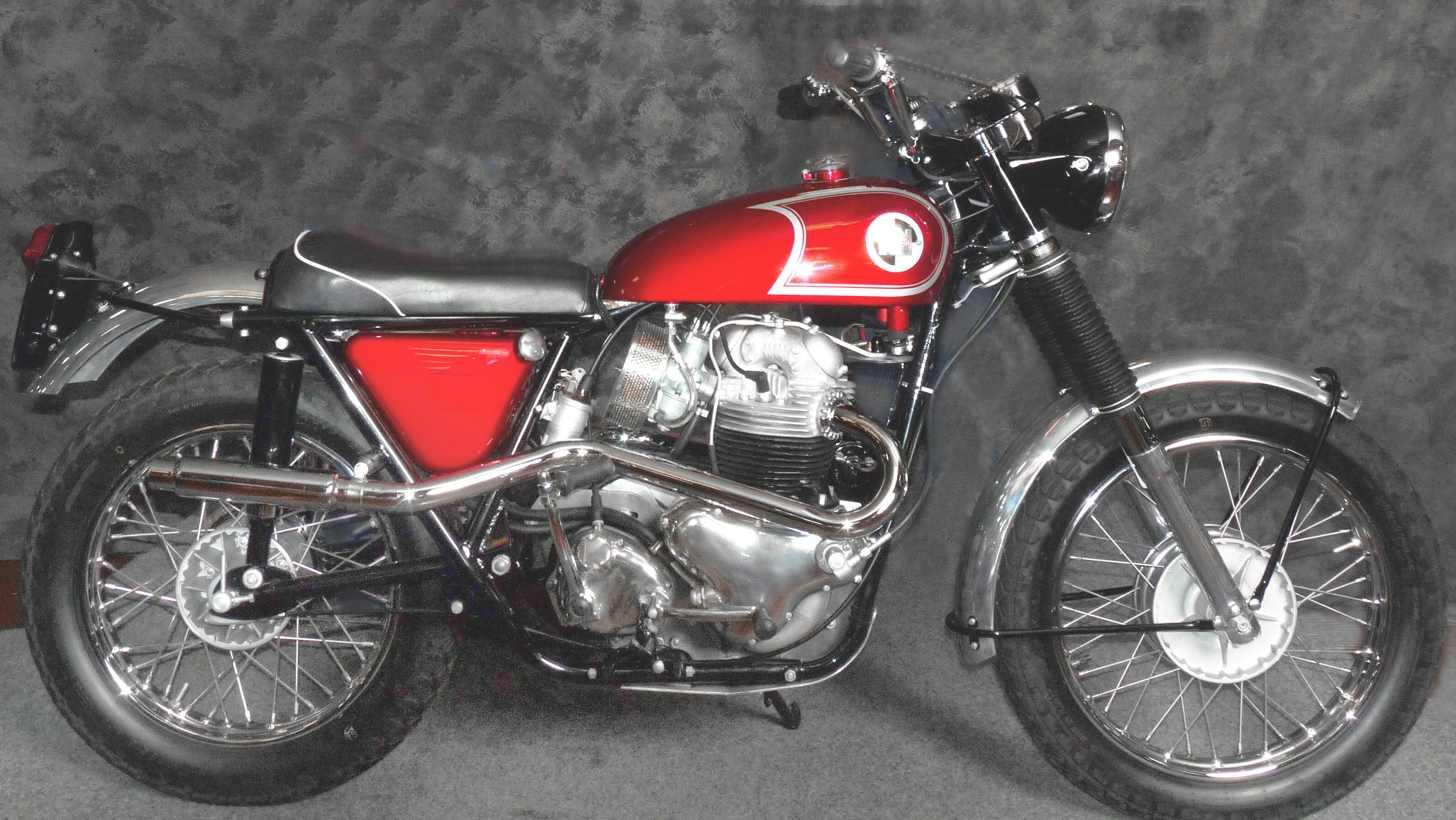
- Manufacturer: Norton-Villiers
- Also called: P11A Ranger
- Production: 1967–1969
- Predecessor: Norton Atlas
- Engine: 745 cc (45.5 cu in) air-cooled OHV parallel twin
- Transmission: Four-speed, chain

The Norton P11 is a 745 cc (45.5 cu in) air-cooled OHV parallel twin motorcycle that was made by Norton-Villiers from 1967 to 1969. Designed as an extremely light high power-to-weight ratio desert racer, the P11 was revised in 1968 to the P11A and marketed as the Norton Ranger, a road legal version of the P11 with a more comfortable seat to make it suitable for normal road use. The Norton P11 gained a reputation as a 'desert racer' in the late 1960s but by 1969 lighter two stroke desert racers began to dominate the sport and the Norton had begun Commando production and it was selling well. Norton ended production of the P11 series to concentrate on the Commando, which used a number of ideas developed on the P11 series.

== Development ==
Norton-Villiers developed the P11 from the Norton Atlas and Norton/Matchless N15CS and G15CS models as an export model for the growing sport of desert racing. Prototyped by Californian Norton Distributor Bob Blair using the Atlas 750 cc twin cylinder engine in a Matchless G85 CS (Competition Springframe) Reynolds 531 lightweight steel frame. Blair might have been responding to requests from the importer, Joseph Berliner of Berliner Motor Corporation. The aim was to achieve the best possible power-to-weight ratio, so all the cycle parts were made as light as possible, with a small alloy fuel tank. The magneto and Amal Monobloc carburettors on the prototype were replaced with twin coil capacitor ignition and twin Concentric carburettors, as well as a speedometer and tachometer and an alloy sump guard. The fuel tank and alloy oil tank were painted in Candy Apple Red with the frame in black. The new motorcycle was known as Project 11, and although testers of the prototype suggested that it should be called the Cheetah 45, it was eventually shortened to P11 and built at the former Associated Motor Cycles factory in Woolwich, London, largely from spare parts. The first P11 (No. 121007) was completed in March 1967 and the first batch were exported to the US and launched under the advertising slogan "Dynamite on wheels". They sold well with demand outstripping supply.

== Norton Ranger ==
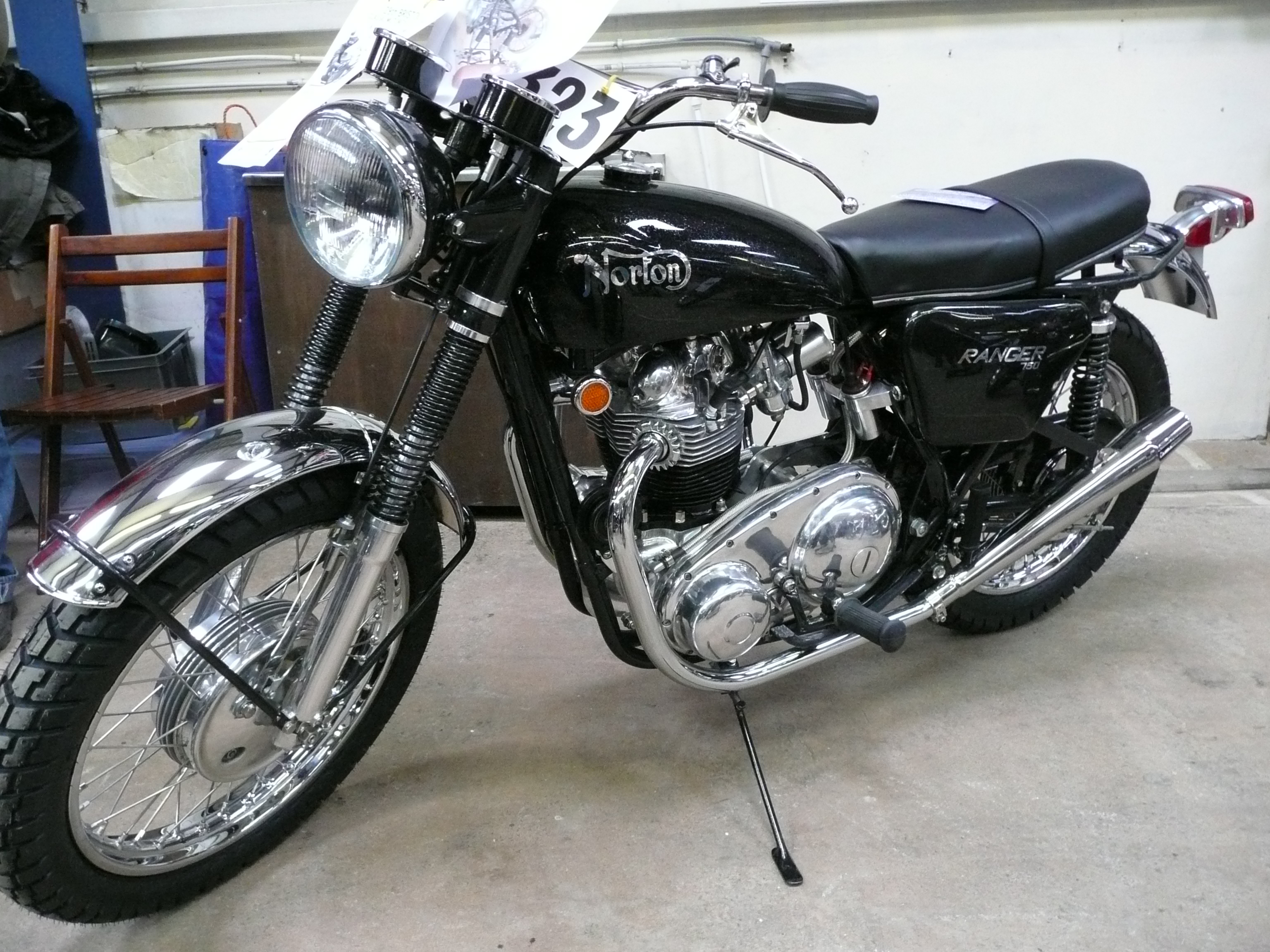
1968 Norton Ranger

In 1968 the P11 was revised to the P11A and marketed as the Norton Ranger, a road legal version of the P11 with a more comfortable seat to make it suitable for normal road use as well as off-road racing. The P11A/Ranger also had a low level exhaust fitted with long tapered silencers with detachable end caps and baffles. The availability of spare parts at the Norton-Villiers factory led to several changes of specification, and the P11, P11A and Ranger were produced with four different types of oil tanks (two alloy, two steel), 3.6 gallon and 2.2 gallon petrol tanks, different types of handlebars, forks and frames, two ignition systems and two different cylinder heads (with the last models produced using Norton Commando castings). The last model made was the Norton Ranger 750 which was the same as the P.11A/Ranger with stronger side stand mounting brackets, a front brake light and a Ranger 750 transfer on the oil tank and battery cover.

By 1969, lighter two-stroke desert racers began to dominate the sport and the Norton Commando had started production and was selling well. It was decided to end production of the P11 series to concentrate on the Commando - which used a number of ideas developed on the P11 series.
