= BSA Company =

Motorcycle manufacturer

- Type: Subsidiary
- Industry: Motorcycle manufacturing
- Founded: 1919; 107 years ago, Birmingham
- Headquarters: Southampton, United Kingdom
- Area served: Worldwide
- Products: Motorcycles
- Parent: Mahindra & Mahindra
- Website: www.bsacompany.co.uk

BSA Company Limited is a motorcycle manufacturer which purchased rights to the BSA name from Birmingham Small Arms Company's successor, Dennis Poore's Manganese Bronze Holdings, upon the liquidation of Norton Villiers Triumph in 1978.

In October 2016, India's Mahindra Group purchased BSA for £3.4 million in an effort to reintroduce motorcycles bearing the famous BSA name.

== Origin ==
When NVT Motorcycles Limited was liquidated in 1978, its management, then under William Colquhoun, formed a new company (BSA Company) and bought from NVT the rights to the BSA motorcycle brand.

== Military motorcycles ==
BSA Company produced military motorcycles (with Rotax engines) and motorcycles for developing countries (with Yamaha engines) under the BSA name. In the latter case, the old "Bushman" name was recalled to duty; it had previously been used on high ground clearance Bantams sold to the likes of Australian sheep farmers. Having moved from Small Heath to Coventry in 1973, Colquhoun moved the company again in 1986 to Blockley in Gloucestershire, where production continued on its military and off-road motorcycles – mostly then exported to African states.

== Andover Norton ==
In 1991, BSA Company was merged with another buy-out company, Mike Jackson's Andover Norton International Ltd., to form a new BSA Group. BSA purchased the Norton Spares business from Norton Motors, and this change to the cash starved spares business prompted a rapid and continuing growth in the sale of genuine parts.

MZ (GB) Ltd was acquired, and BSA Group became heavily involved with the renowned Norton F1 designers Seymour Powell in developing and launching the MuZ Skorpion, later to win the 1994 BBC Design Award. In December 1994, Colquhoun and Jackson's BSA Group was taken over by a newly formed BSA Regal Group and the company moved again, this time to Southampton.

== BSA Regal ==
In 1997, production began on the hand built 400cc Gold SR with the first batch of over 200 machines being exported to Japan. Production of the BSA John McLaren also commenced in 1997 and continue to be built in small numbers under licence. The spares business continued to supply the world's Norton twin owners and restorers. Development work with Government agencies and non-European motorcycle manufacturers had been augmented by the Southampton-based Regal Group and in 1999 a 500cc version of the Gold SR was launched for the European and American markets.

By 2003, it had become clear that demand for the hand built Gold SR was not reaching previous expectations and production ceased. The 1,000cc Tempest, widely acclaimed in its prototype form, did not reach the production line and MZ sales failed to reach their promising potential. In 2007, BSA's involvement with MZ ended when the parts business was sold. In the same year, Joe Seifert, the then new owner of Norton Motors Ltd, made an interesting and successful bid for BSA Regal's Norton Commando parts business. The bid included the return to BSA Company of its European trademarks.

In 2008, a serious infringement of BSA Company's trademarks occurred in India when Tube Investments of India, the eventual owners of the BSA trademarks for bicycles, used the BSA trademark on electric powered motor scooters. In January 2015, the infringement cases were still in the High Court of Madras and the Supreme Court of India.

In 2012, the BSA-Regal website listed only the history of BSA bikes, not any new or re-manufactured models. However, the Birmingham-based motorcycle parts company MCA (Aston) Limited was licensed by BSA Company to manufacture and market parts for BSA motorcycles.

In June 2014, BSA Company, working in conjunction with a British company, Ripe Motorcycles, launched the all-electric BSA John McLaren TAG 350, a small-wheeled off-roader. In January 2015, the model range was increased to include the BSA TAG 1000 (1 kW) for motocross competition, with a further model extension planned with the BSA TAG Race Supermoto.

== Mahindra Group ==
In October 2016, Mahindra Group of India bought BSA for £3.4 million. Mahindra Group makes small-capacity motorcycles and scooters in India, through its subsidiary Mahindra Two Wheelers. Mahindra Group also owns a majority stake in France's Peugeot Motocycles, and it has reintroduced Jawa motorcycles in India launching new models.

=== New BSA Gold Star ===
In late 2021, Mahindra announced a new model developed in Birmingham, England to be made in India. Named Gold Star after the 1950s/1960s original and with similar styling, it will have a 652 cc liquid cooled engine.
