= AJS Model 31 =

British motorcycle

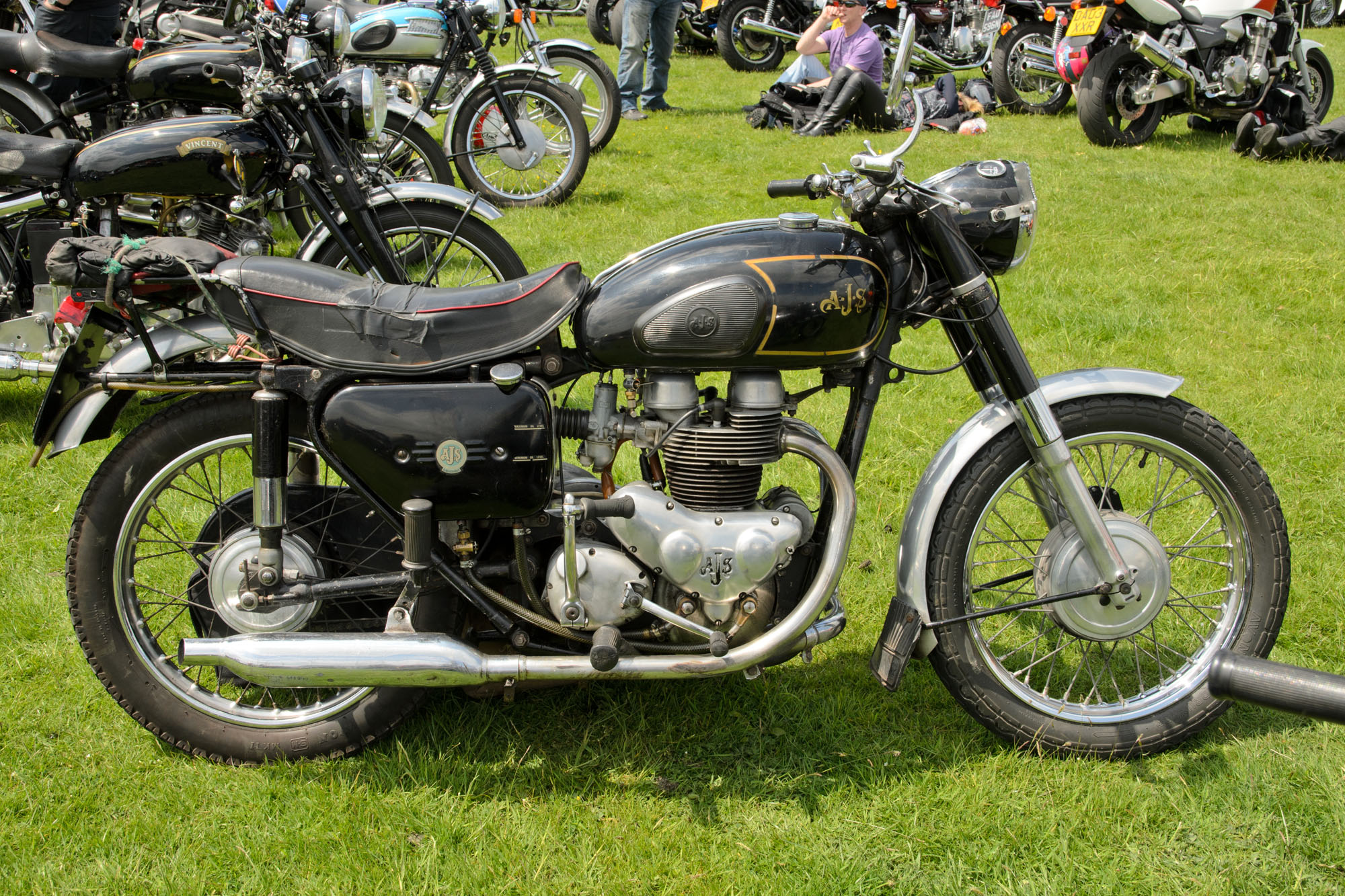
- Manufacturer: Associated Motor Cycles, Plumstead, London
- Also called: Hurricane
- Production: 1958–1966
- Predecessor: AJS Model 30
- Engine: 646cc air-cooled parallel twin
- Power: 35bhp @ 6,500rpm
- Transmission: Four-speed gearbox to chain final drive
- Brakes: drum brakes
- Weight: 396 pounds (180 kg) (dry)

The AJS Model 31 was a British motorcycle made by Associated Motor Cycles at the former Matchless works in Plumstead, London. Developed in 1958 specifically to capture the potentially lucrative US market, the last Model 31 was produced in 1966.

== Development ==
=== AJS Model 31 ===
The AJS Model 31 was also produced as the Matchless G12 by the same company. Designed by Phil Walker, AMC knew that it had to be a 650cc but wanted to use as many cycle parts as possible from the preceding 600cc Matchless G11, which had been badge-engineered as the AJS Model 30. The cylinders could not be bored out further, so the stroke was lengthened from 72.8mm to 79.3mm, increasing capacity to 646cc. That meant developing a new crankshaft and primary chaincase, which also provided the opportunity to add a Lucas alternator. Volume production began in September 1958.

=== AJS Model 31 De Luxe ===
In 1959 the Model 31 was redesigned and modernised as the De Luxe, with a new full cradle tubular duplex frame and a new cylinder head. Vibration had always been a problem, so the crankshaft was upgraded to nodular iron. Capable of 100 mph performance, the AJS Model 31 became popular with the North American market.

=== AJS Model 31 CSR ===
The AJS Model 31 CSR designation officially stood for Competition / Springer / Road but it was dubbed the Coffee Shop Racer by its rivals. With its distinctive two into one "siamese" exhaust system and upgraded camshafts, the CSR was a high-performance motorcycle but still prone to leaks and vibration. The factory diverted Chief Engineer Jack Williams from AJS 7R development to address the problems and modify the bikes for racing, with the result that Ron Langston and Don Chapman won the prestigious Thruxton 500 long-distance endurance race on the AJS Model 31. Encouraged by this victory in 1963, AJS named the Model 31 "Hurricane". By 1966 AMC was in financial trouble, and production ended.

== See also ==
- List of motorcycles of the 1950s
