= Norton Villiers Triumph =

British motorcycle manufacturer, 1973–1978

- Industry: Motorcycles
- Predecessors: BSA-Triumph; Norton-Villiers
- Founded: 1973
- Defunct: 1978
- Fate: Receivership
- Successors: BSA Company; FB-AJS; Meriden Motorcycle Co-operative; Norton Motors (1978); Villiers Australia Pty; Wolverhampton Industrial Engines
- Headquarters: Andover, Meriden, Small Heath, Wolverhampton
- Key people: Dennis Poore
- Subsidiaries: Triumph, Norton

Norton Villiers Triumph (NVT) was a British motorcycle manufacturer, formed by the British government to continue the UK motorcycling industry.

== Formation ==
Triumph had been owned by the BSA Group since 1951, but by 1972 the merged BSA-Triumph group was in serious financial trouble. In March 1973 the value of BSA shares slumped, which affected production at Meriden, causing 300 workers there to be laid off. British government policy at the time was to save strategic industries with taxpayers' money, and as BSA-Triumph had won the Queen's Awards for Exports a few years earlier, the industry was deemed eligible for financial support. The Conservative government under Ted Heath decided to bail out the company, provided that to compete with the Japanese it merged with financially troubled Norton Villiers (the remains of Associated Motor Cycles, which had gone bust in 1966), a subsidiary of British engineering conglomerate Manganese Bronze Holdings.

The merged company was created in 1973, with Manganese Bronze exchanging the motorcycle parts of Norton Villiers in exchange for the non-motorcycling bits of the BSA Group – mainly Carbodies, the builder of the Austin FX4 London taxi: the classic "black cab". As BSA was both a failed company and a solely British-known brand (the company's products had always been most successfully marketed in North America under the Triumph brand), the new conglomerate was called Norton Villiers Triumph—being effectively the consolidation of the entire once-dominant British motorcycle industry, thanks to the rise of the car and the Japanese manufacturers.

== Operations ==
NVT inherited four motorcycle factories—Small Heath (ex-BSA); Andover and Wolverhampton (Norton); and Meriden (Triumph). Chairman Dennis Poore intended to move all motorcycle production to Small Heath and Wolverhampton. Although Meriden was the most modern, its workers were the most militant and had the worst productivity of the four. Poore had plans to sell the Meriden site to Jaguar. In September 1973 Poore met with union representatives at Meriden and informed them that the factory was to be closed in the next few months and all 1,700 workers made redundant. In response, the workers occupied the factory and refused to allow any plant, components or completed motorcycles to leave the factory.

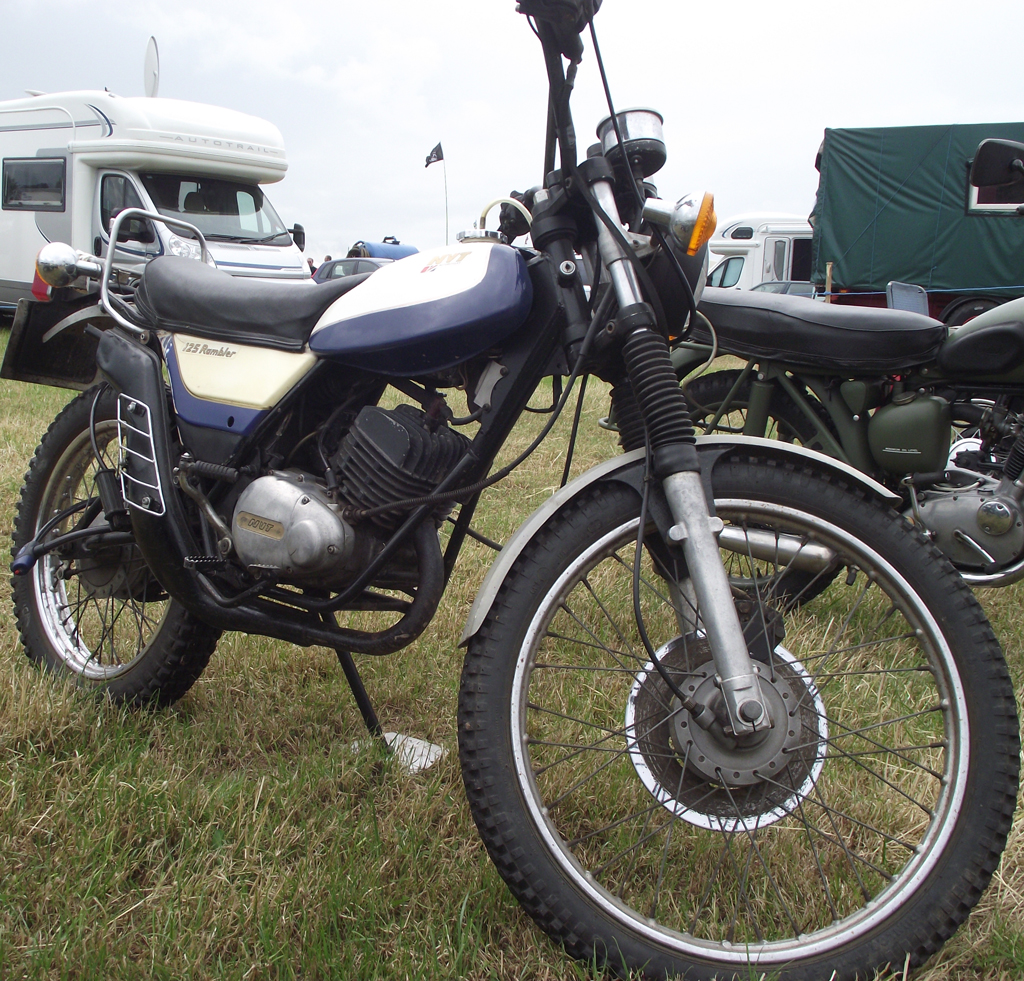
NVT Rambler 125

Still short of development cash, the company was restricted to launching developments of existing products, most notably around the popular Norton Commando. With its classical parallel twin probably by now overdeveloped, from March 1973 the Roadster, Hi Rider, and the Interstate all began to use a new 828 cc engine. Later NVT also produced the Easy Rider moped including a "sixteener" version with pedals and the NVT rambler 125/175 cc. This had a Yamaha engine housed in a British monoshock frame. Instruments were from Yamaha and forks, brakes and wheel parts from three Italian manufacturers. The Rambler later became the BSA Tracker. What money there was for development now had to be focused on one engine development. Deciding that the Japanese had taken the market a step forward, NVT were looking for a competitive edge, and had two products that could be developed, both from the BSA side of the company:

- The 500 cc twin, stepped-piston engine, with a monocoque pressed-steel frame, named internally the Wulf
- A rotary Wankel engine

Concluding that the commuter market was dying, NVT chose the Wankel, and as Peter Williams won the 1973 Formula 750 Isle of Man T.T. and Mick Grant came second for the Norton Racing team that year, the decision was to put the new engine in a new Norton motorcycle. However, the infrastructure of the old Norton company was itself being closed down, as the Andover factory closed after a sit-in. This coincided with the Conservative government of Ted Heath losing power, and in the light of the Three-Day Week the subsidy was withdrawn from June 1974 under the new Labour Government of Harold Wilson.

NVT continued with a programme of works closures, deciding to concentrate production on Wolverhampton and Small Heath. Poorly handled in communications, the announcement caused a sit-in at Meriden which, as it produced parts for other factories, caused Small Heath to shut down. With the election of the 1974 Labour government, the Meriden workers' co-operative was formed with NVT its sole customer for its production of 750 cc Triumph Bonneville T140V and Triumph Tiger TR7V models. Forced by American legislation to move all brake controls to the right-hand side of the bike, the standard used by most other manufacturers, including the Japanese. The foot-brake lever on British motorcycles was positioned on the left-hand side as it was to this side that sidecars were affixed. The brake pedal on the sidecar was then positioned alongside the brake pedal of the motorcycle allowing braking of both motorcycle and sidecar with one foot. The company reduced its range to five models: two Norton Commandos (the Mk.3 Interstate and the Roadster), the Triumph Bonneville T140V, the Triumph Tiger TR7RV and the Triumph Trident T160V. Both Nortons and the T160 were improved by the fitting of an electric starter, a rear disc brake and the left side gear change/right foot brake. The Bonneville got its own electric start in 1980 when marketed by the Meriden workers' co-operative itself. Unlike other motorcycles of this era, the kickstart lever was retained and the electric starter on Nortons was more properly referred to as an electric assister.

== Break-up and closure ==
In July 1975, the new Industry Minister Eric Varley recalled a loan for £4 million and refused to renew the company's export credits. The company went into receivership, and redundancies were announced for all of the staff at the various sites.

The Wolverhampton factory went into receivership in September 1975 and closed on 13 October making 1,600 workers redundant.

The closure of Small Heath was also announced in September 1975 and when an order for Tridents from the Saudi Arabian police force was completed the factory closed in February 1976.

Ironically, slated by management for closure, the Meriden site survived on Eric Varley's predecessor, Tony Benn's plan to exploit the Triumph Bonneville by a worker co-operative with a substantial government loan.

The Norton Wankel project was sold off by the receivers into private hands, with slow-selling and under-developed rotary-engined motorcycles appearing under the Norton name for the next 15 years; while Wolverhampton, having no viable products to produce, was reduced to a workers' sit-in and showing of an updated Commando model named Norton 76 and a 500 cc twin based on the Wulf concept. After Wolverhampton closed, having made Commandos from remaining spares, the workers took the former Tong Castle gates and erected them at the former Marston site.

NVT was eventually liquidated in 1978. Even though Norton Villiers Triumph is no more, motorcycles bearing the Triumph name are still being made; the marketing rights to Triumph were sold to the Meriden workers' co-operative in 1977 and upon its having gone into receivership in 1983, sold on to a new Triumph Motorcycles Ltd company situated in Hinckley, Leicestershire. Dennis Poore became managing director of Manganese Bronze, until his death in 1987.

== See also ==
- Triumph Owners Motor Cycle Club

== Bibliography ==
- Falloon, Ian (1 October 2019). The Complete Book of Classic and Modern Triumph Motorcycles 1937-Today. Beverly, MA, USA: Motorbooks. ISBN 978-0-7603-6601-1.
- Fleet, Ken (1976). "Triumph Meriden" (PDF). In Coates, Ken (ed.). The New worker co-operatives. Nottingham: Spokesman Books for the Institute for Workers' Control. pp. 85–96. ISBN 978-0851241470.
- "Those were the days - 1975". Express & Star.
