= AJS 7R =

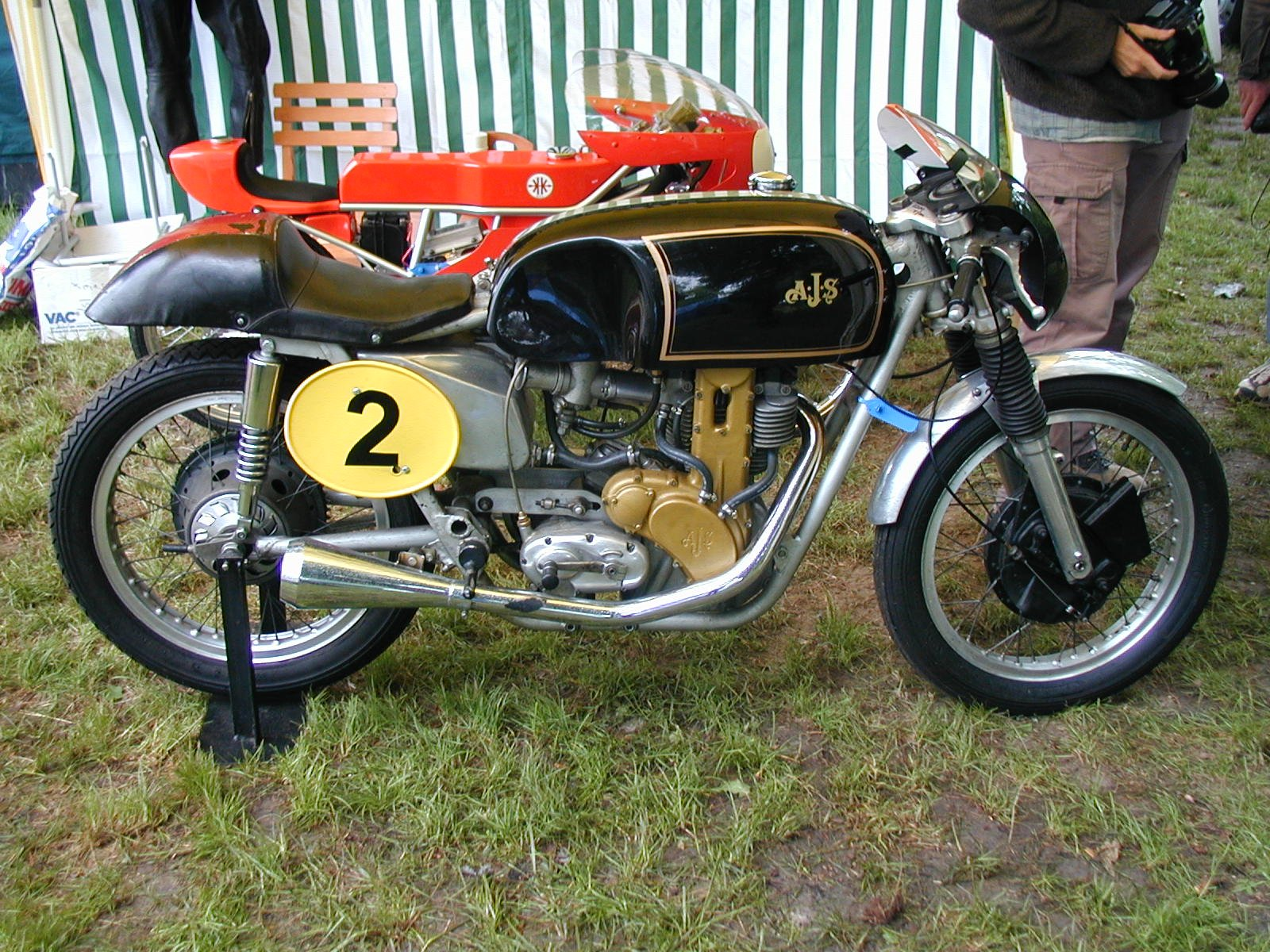
- AJS 7R in road racing configuration
- Manufacturer: Associated Motor Cycles
- Also called: 'Boy Racer'
- Production: Pre-war 1936 to 1939 (factory racing); Post-war 1948 to 1954 (factory racing), 1954 up to 1963 (public availability)
- Engine: 348cc single SOHC four stroke
- Bore / stroke: 74 mm × 81 mm (2.9 in × 3.2 in); 75.5 mm × 78 mm (2.97 in × 3.07 in)
- Power: 37 bhp (28 kW) at 7500 rpm.
- Weight: 285 pounds (129 kg) (dry)

The AJS 7R was a British 350 cc racing motorcycle built from 1948 to 1963 by Associated Motor Cycles. It was also commonly known as the ‘Boy Racer’, and won victories both for the factory and for privateers right from its introduction in 1948.

== The AJS 7R ==
A new design by Phil Walker, the chain-driven overhead camshaft 7R had the history of the pre-war AJS ‘cammy’ singles behind it. Initially, the 7R was not quite as powerful as its competitors, producing 32 bhp (24 kW) at 7500 rpm. The duplex frame and Teledraulic front forks remained relatively unchanged during production, while the engine had a number of changes. The included valve angle was progressively narrowed, and the crankshaft strengthened. In 1956 the engine dimensions changed from the original long-stroke 74 x 81 mm to the ‘squarer’ 75.5 x 78 mm. The AMC gearbox replaced the older Burman unit in 1958.

== AJS 7R3 ==
In 1951 AJS development engineer Ike Hatch developed a 75.5 mm bore x 78 mm stroke, three valve head version of the 7R making 36 bhp (27 kW). It was called the AJS 7R3, and was Ike's response to the Italian multi-cylinder racers. They did well enough in their first year, not as well the second. For 1954 Jack Williams, the works team manager, developed the bike further, lowering the engine in the frame, and making some tuning changes that gave 40 bhp (30 kW) @ 7800 rpm. It immediately won the first two rounds of the World Championship and took first at the Isle of Man TT. These were factory specials, but one has survived, and a second has been reconstructed from spares.

== Racing ==
The 1957 AJS 7R 350 cc, with 75.5 mm bore and 78 mm stroke, gave 38.5 bhp (28.7 kW) at 7600-7800 rpm, and weighed 285 lb (129 kg). The top speed was 180-190 km/h (115-120 mph).

AMC withdrew from the world of works, and one-off, road racing at the end of the 1954, with the death of Ike Hatch, and in the face of fierce competition from the other European bikes.

After this AJS made a production version of the standard two valve AJS 7R, for privateers and a 500 cc version, badged as a Matchless G50 was also sold. By the end of production in 1963 the two valve OHC AJS 7R engine made over 40 bhp (30 kW).

Swedish rider Bill Nilsson converted an AJS 7R road racing machine into a motocross bike and rode it to win the inaugural F.I.M. 500cc Motocross World Championship held in 1957. AJS 7Rs won the 1961, 62 and 63 Junior Manx Grand Prix races and came second in 1966.

== See also ==
- List of motorcycles of the 1940s
- List of motorcycles of the 1950s
