= Norton Atlas =

Motorcycle powered by straight-twin engines

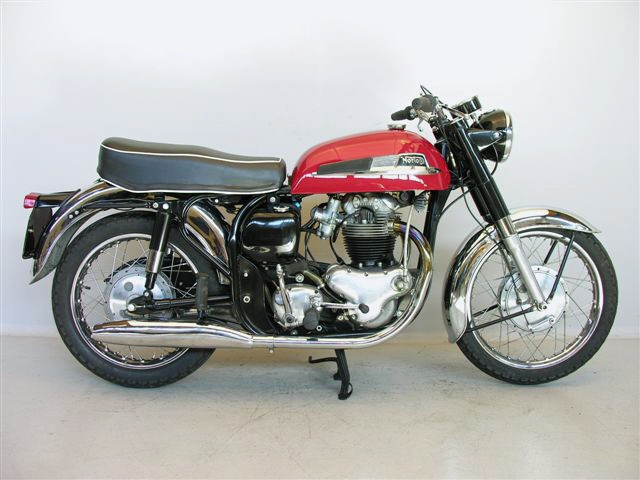
- Manufacturer: Norton Motorcycles
- Engine: 745 cc (45 cu in) air cooled twin
- Bore / stroke: 73 mm × 89 mm (2.9 in × 3.5 in)
- Power: 55 bhp (41 kW) at 6500 rpm
- Transmission: Four-speed, chain final drive
- Suspension: Telescopic forks dual shocks (5-way adjustable)
- Brakes: Drum, 203 mm (front) 178 mm (rear)
- Weight: 185 kg (408 lb) (wet)
- Fuel capacity: 13.5 L (3.0 imp gal; 3.6 US gal)

The Norton Atlas was a Norton motorcycle made between 1962 and 1968, until it was replaced by the Norton Commando.

In 2026, Norton revealed a new, completely reimagined, modern, middleweight, adventure touring bike under the same name plate.

== Development ==
The Mark 1 Atlas was launched as the 750SS in the early 1960s, but by the time it appeared c. 1962 it was being called a 750cc Atlas, with Norton's famous Featherbed frame. Designer Bert Hopwood's 1949 497cc Dominator engine had been bored and stroked over the years to 745cc, via 600cc and then 650cc versions, to appeal to the American market and initially was only produced for export.

The styling was aimed at the US market with high-rise handlebars, small 2.5-gallon petrol tank and valanced chrome mudguards and chain guard. The look was completed with a heavy-duty WM3-18 rear wheel, and a Lucas Competition magneto was supplied as standard.

The engine had lower compression than the Dominator (at 7.6:1) and was fitted with a single 376 Amal Monobloc carburettor giving 55 bhp (41 kW) at 6500 rpm. However the design produced excessive vibration at high revs, so the compression ratio was reduced. The Atlas shared many cycle parts with the last of the Dominator twins and had Norton's four-speed gearbox and heavy-duty clutch. Electrics were 6-volt and it had Roadholder forks, adjustable Girling rear shocks and a slimline Featherbed frame.

In 1964 the Atlas was upgraded to 12-volt electrics, and gained a second carburettor and wider fork yokes. A UK version was launched with flat bars and twin instruments. The Atlas continued to be built until 1968 but by then the Norton Commando had taken over.

== Specials and hybrids ==
Specialist tuners such as Dunstall produced Atlas-based racers (Domiracer 750) and offered race-styled roadsters (Dominator 750) although later on Dunstall also designated his roadsters as 'Domiracer'. A few Rickman Metisse frames were either made or later modified by owners to accept Norton power plants, and the factory-built Atlas-powered AMC-Norton hybrids (Norton Matchless) included an Atlas-powered, Matchless-framed, off-road trailster designated P11.

Over seven thousand Atlas hybrids were produced at Plumstead between late 1963 and late 1968 using Atlas engines and various Matchless frames. These had designations G15 or N15 for the roadster and P11 for the trailster (instead of names).

== Resurgence ==
As part of the Resurgence programme, following the TVS Motor Company acquisition of Norton, the Norton Atlas and Atlas GT were unveiled at EICMA 2025 alongside the Manx and Manx R, forming part of Norton's new model range following its acquisition by TVS Motor Company. The Atlas is configured as an adventure-oriented motorcycle, while the Atlas GT uses a more road-focused specification.

The Atlas and Atlas GT were designed and engineered at Norton's headquarters in Solihull, United Kingdom, and are manufactured at TVS Motor Company's facility in Hosur, India. The Atlas uses a 19-inch front wheel and 180 mm of suspension travel at both ends, while the Atlas GT uses 17-inch wheels and 140 mm of suspension travel at both ends.
