= Associated Motor Cycles =

Former British motorcycle manufacturer

Associated Motor Cycles (AMC)
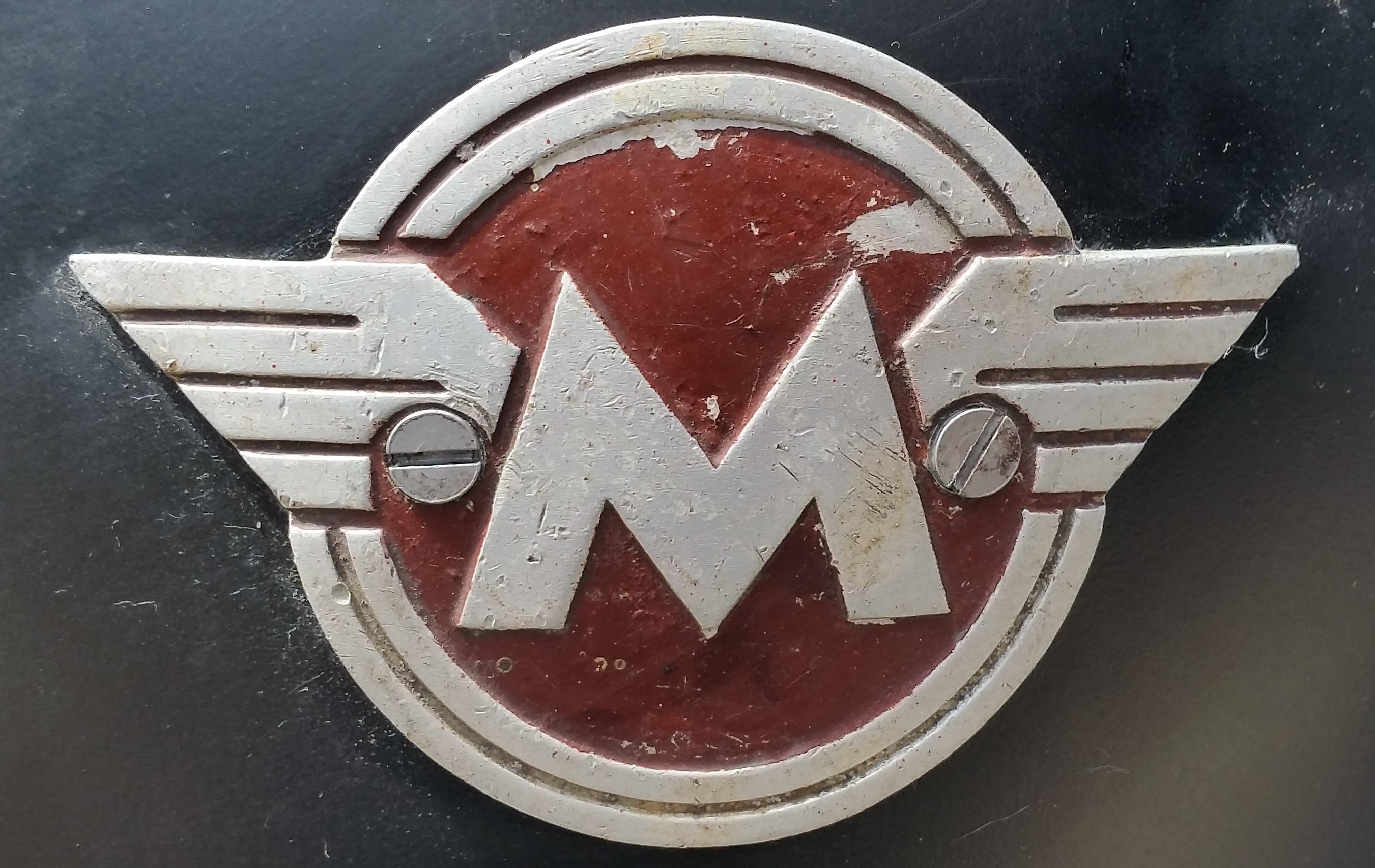
- Industry: Manufacturing and engineering
- Founded: 1938
- Defunct: 1966
- Fate: Taken over
- Successor: Norton-Villiers
- Products: Motorcycles

Associated Motor Cycles (AMC) was a British motorcycle manufacturer founded by the Collier brothers as a parent company for the Matchless and AJS motorcycle companies. It later absorbed Francis-Barnett, James, and Norton before incorporation into Norton-Villiers. Henry Herbert Collier founded Matchless as a cycle company in 1878. His sons Henry (Harry) and Charles (Charlie) joined him and the name was changed to H. Collier & Sons.

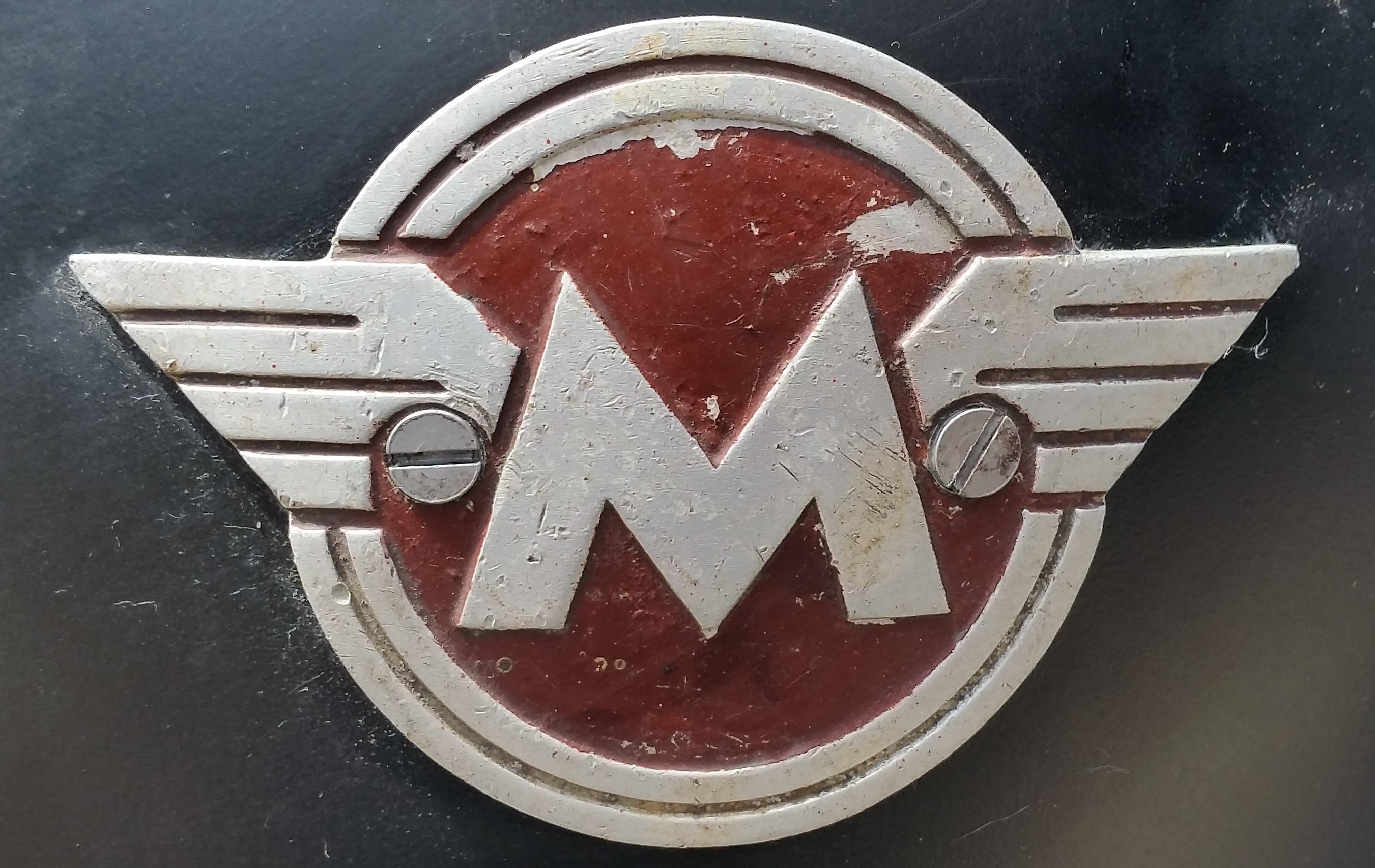
Matchless fuel tank badge

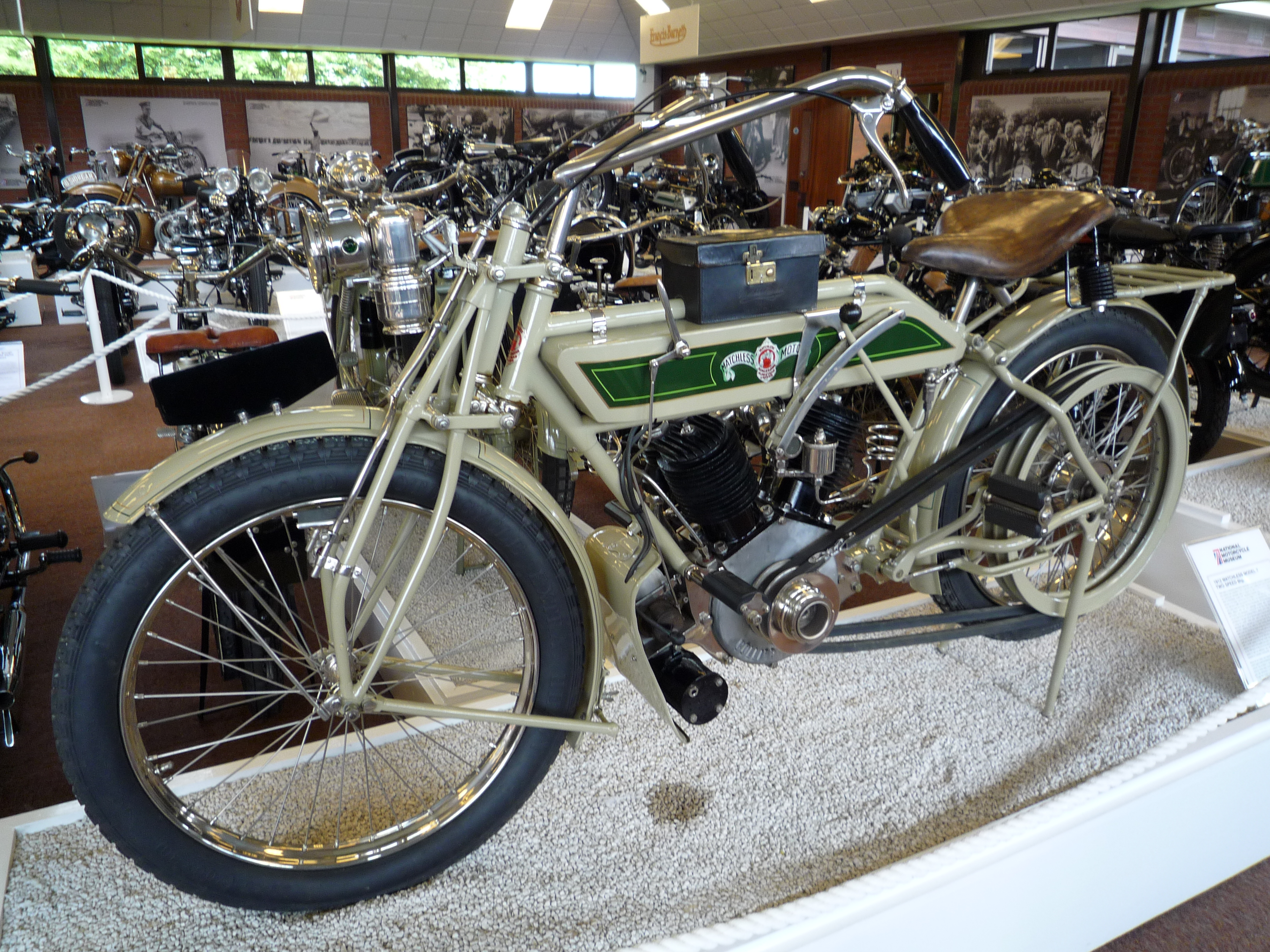
1912 Matchless v-twin

== History ==
AJS had been bought by Matchless's owners, the Colliers, in 1931 and Sunbeam was added in 1937 from Imperial Chemical Industries. The name of the Matchless Motor Cycles company was changed to "Amalgamated Motor Cycles Ltd" in 1937 and "Associated Motor Cycles (AMC)" in 1938. AMC was not a manufacturer in its own right, but rather the parent company of a group of motorcycle manufacturers which included Matchless, AJS, Norton, James, Francis-Barnett, Sunbeam and others.

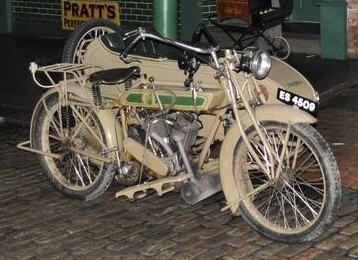
1922 Matchless Model H v-twin with sidecar

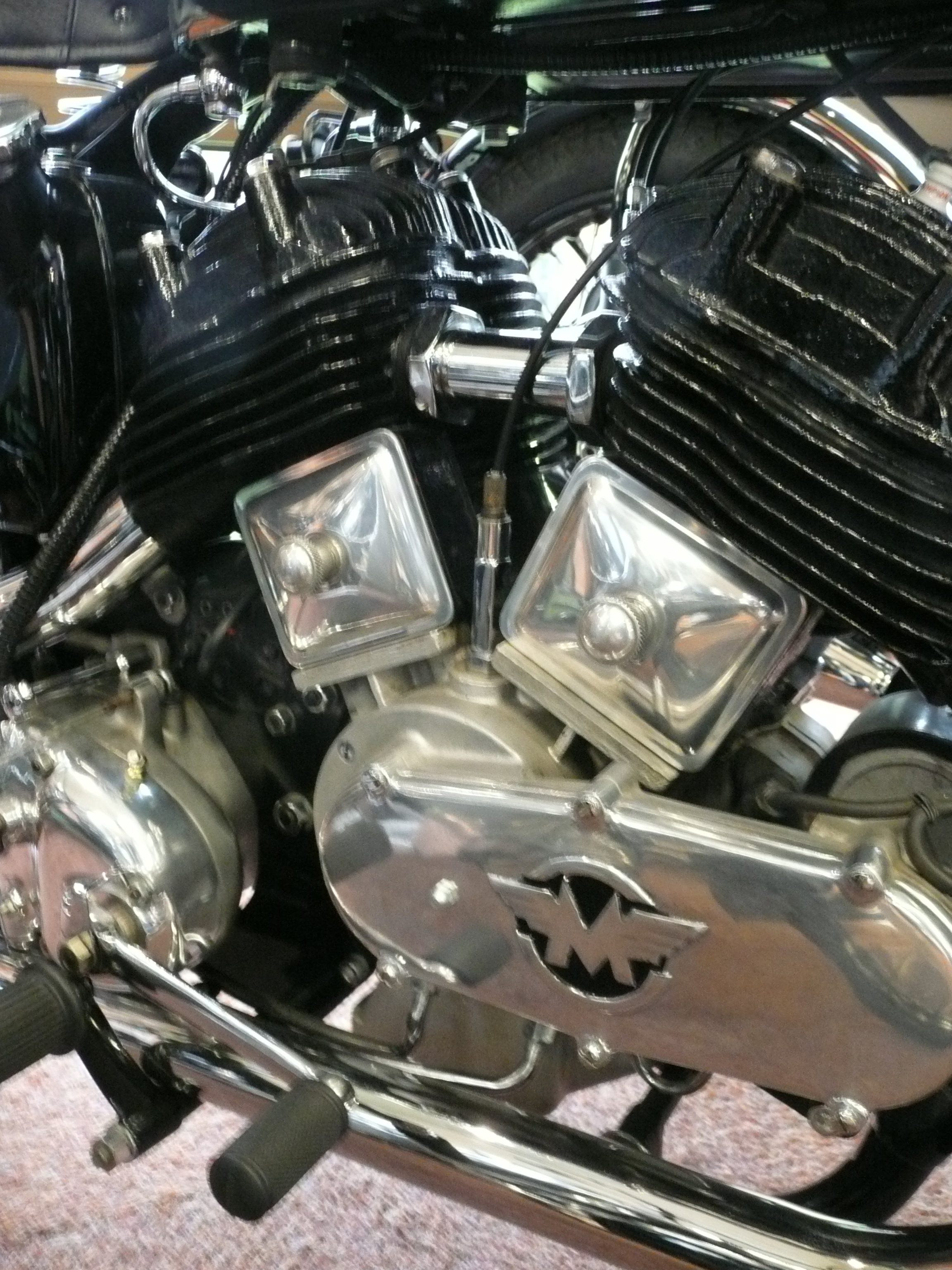
1938 Matchless Model X (close up)

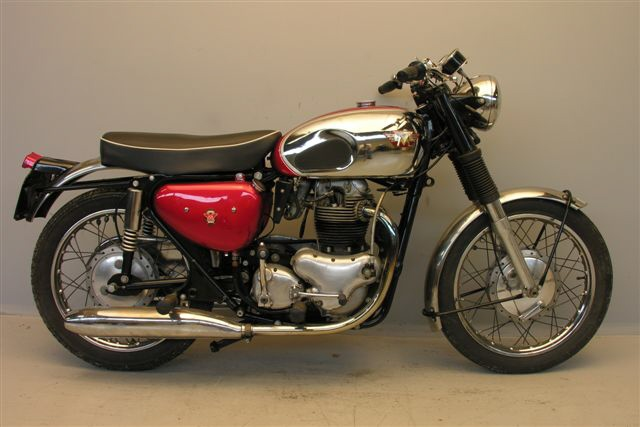
1968 Matchless G15 CSR 750cc twin

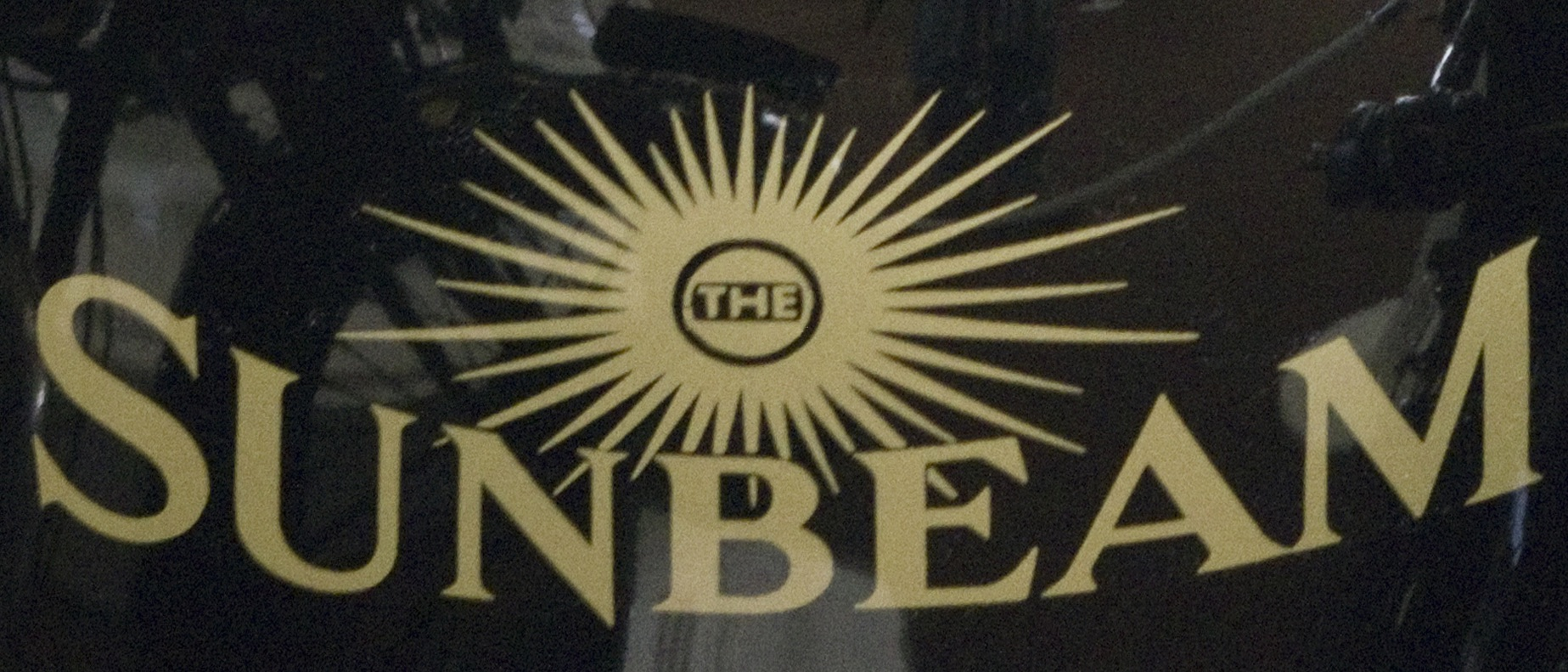
Sunbeam motorcycle fuel tank decal

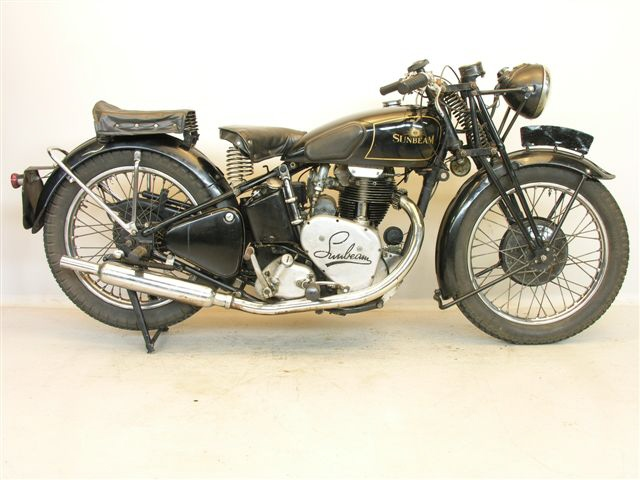
1939 Sunbeam Model B 24 350 cc single

In 1939 a 495 cc AJS V4 was built to compete against the supercharged BMWs then dominating racing. The bike was a water-cooled and supercharged design. In 1939 the dry-sump V4 was the first bike to lap the Ulster Grand Prix course at over 100 mph (161 km/h). It weighed 405 lb (184 kg). Its top speed was 135 mph (217 km/h). Then the Second World War intervened. During the War, Matchless manufactured 80,000 G3 and G3L models for the armed forces. AMC sold the Sunbeam name to BSA in 1943.

=== After World War II ===
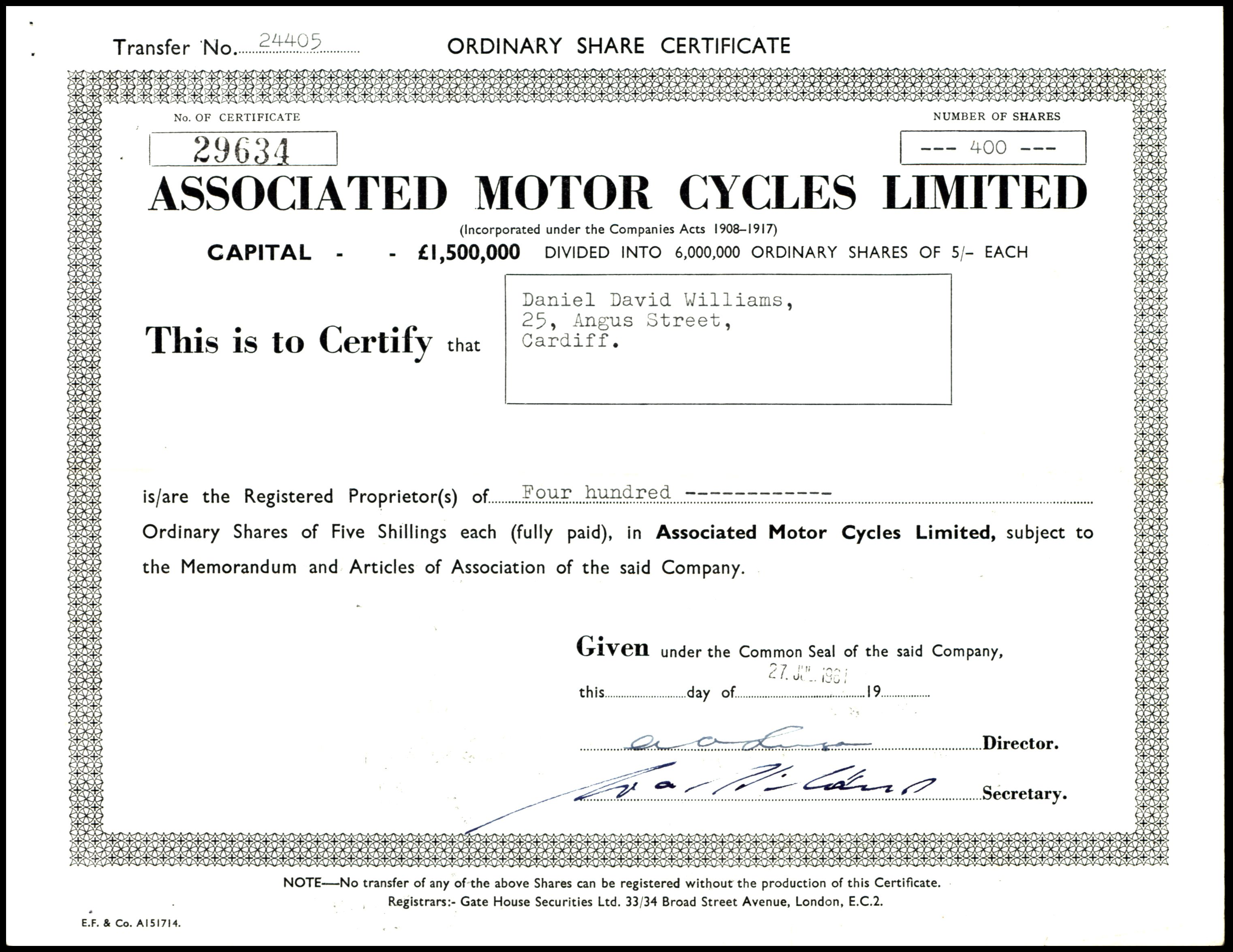
Share certificate of Associated Motor Cycles Ltd., issued 27 July 1961

Post-war landmarks start with the production of Matchless/AJS 350 cc and 500 cc singles, developed from the legendary war-time Matchless G3 produced for the Army. In 1946 Freddie Clarke joined AMC as Chief Development Engineer after a row with his former employers, Triumph, and in 1947 AMC absorbed Francis-Barnett, followed later by the acquisition of James in 1951. In 1949 the first Matchless/AJS vertical twin (500cc) was produced, later to be joined by 600 cc and 650 cc vertical twins in 1956 and 1959 respectively. On the racing front AMC were fielding the AJS Porcupine (500 cc forward-facing parallel twin), the AJS 7R (32 bhp, 350 cc OHC single), the Matchless G50 (a 500 cc variant of the 7R) and by 1951, the Matchless G45 (500 cc vertical twin). The AJS Porcupine had been designed for supercharging, before the rules changed ending supercharged racing motorcycles, but even so, Les Graham won the 1949 World Championship on an unsupercharged AJS 500 cc Porcupine.

In 1951 AJS development engineer Ike Hatch developed a 75.5 mm (3.0 in) bore x 78 mm (3.1 in) stroke, three valve head version of the AJS 7R making 36 bhp (27 kW). It was called the AJS 7R3, and was Ike's response to the Italian multi-cylinder racers. They did well enough in their first year, not as well the second. For 1954 Jack Williams, the works team manager, developed the bike further, lowering the engine in the frame, and making some tuning changes that gave 40 bhp (30 kW) @ 7800 rpm. It immediately won the first two rounds of the World Championship and took first at the Isle of Man TT. These were factory specials, but one has survived, and a second has been reconstructed from spares. In 1953 there was a Clubman range of Matchless/AJS 350 cc and 500 cc singles, and the production model Matchless G45 500 twin became available.

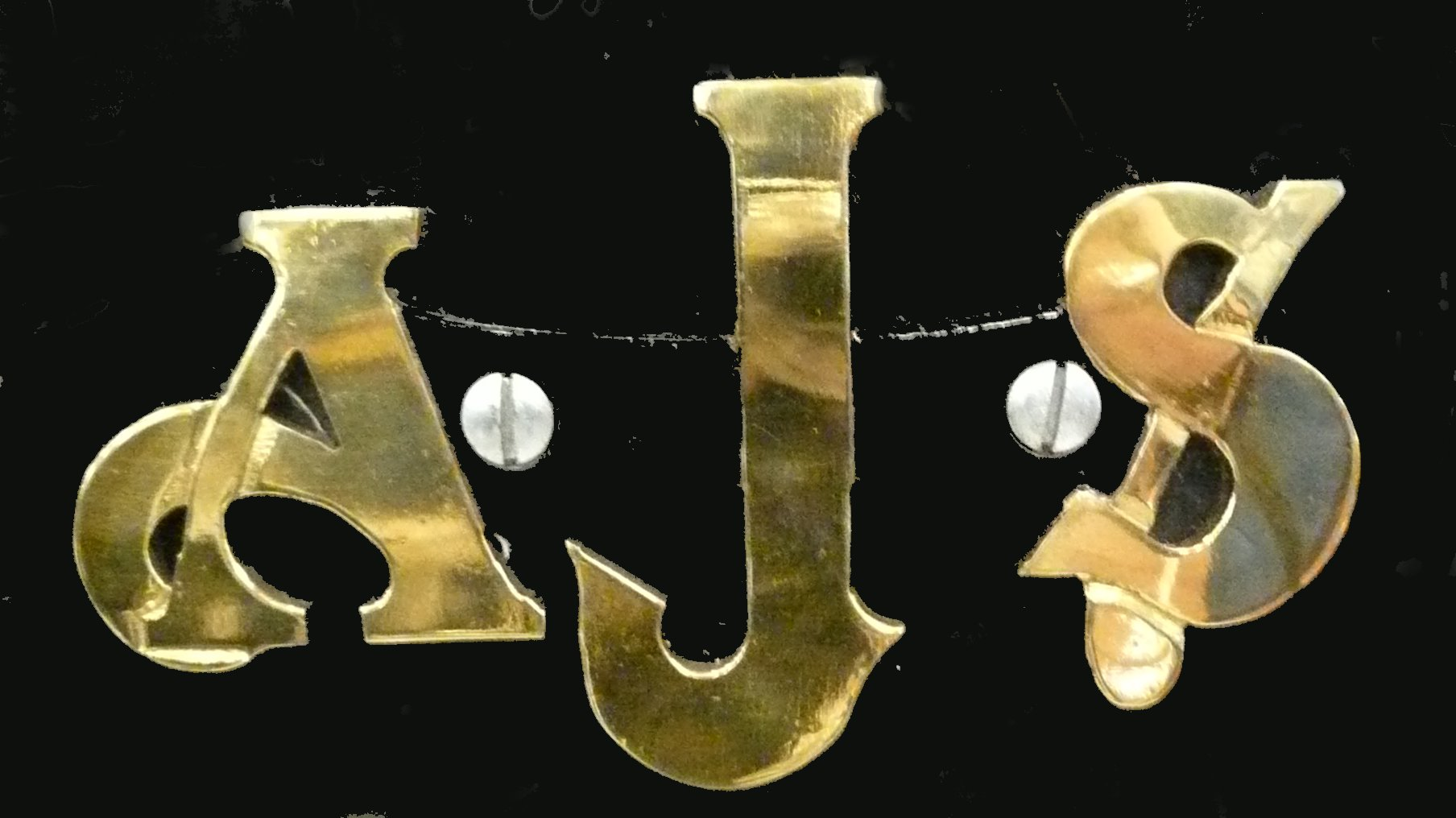
AJS fuel tank badge

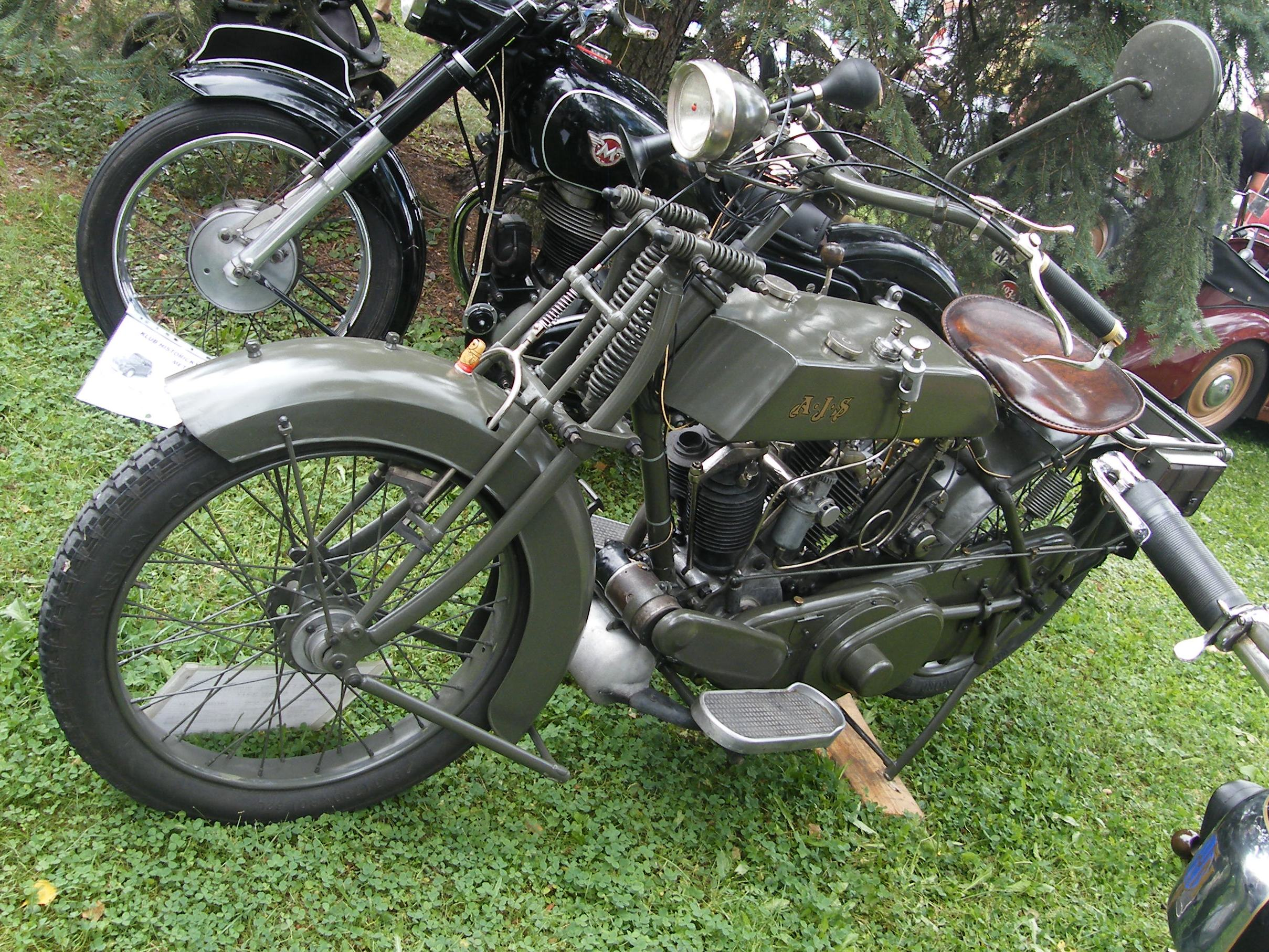
1917 AJS Model D 750 cc v-twin (green, foreground)

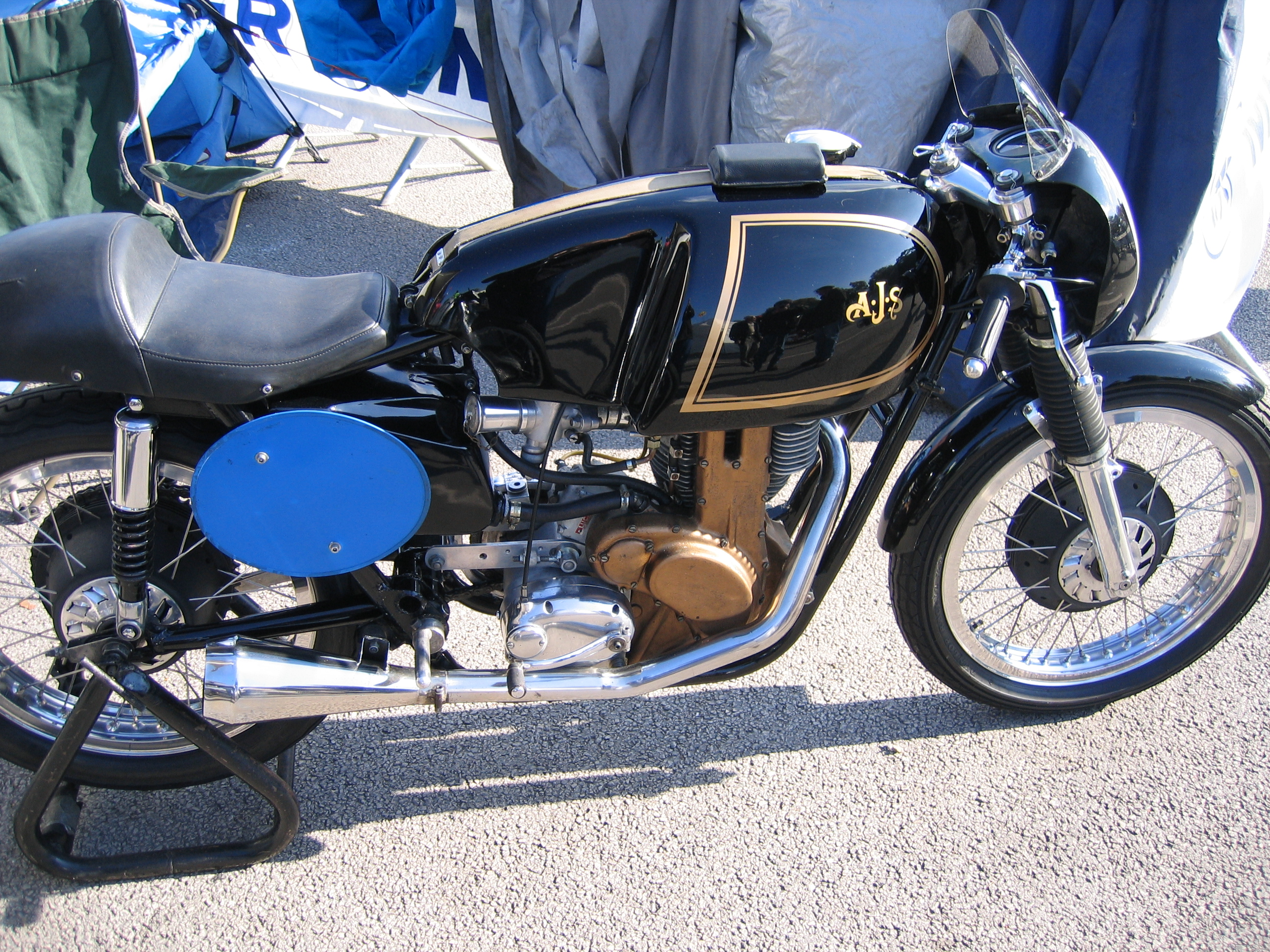
AJS 7R single-cylinder racer, manufactured 1950s/1960s

In 1952 further extended the empire by taking over Norton. Then 1958 saw the introduction of unit construction 250 cc AJS/Matchless machines. From 1948, competition models of the singles were produced which gave the company some memorable wins.

AMC withdrew from the world of works and one-off road racing at the end of the 1954, with the death of H.J.'Ike' Hatch, and in the face of fierce competition from the other European bikes. Instead of works specials, AJS and Norton would make the production versions of the Manx Norton and the standard two valve AJS 7R, for privateers.

In 1958 the Matchless/AJS road bikes were joined by a 250 cc and in 1960 by a 350 cc for a lightweight series of singles.

In 1960 leading light Bert Hopwood resigned and joined Triumph at Meriden. That same year AMC posted a profit of a just over £200,000, not so good compared with BSA's £3.5 million. Then in 1961 they posted a loss of £350,000. With the closure of the Norton plant at Birmingham in 1962 and the merger of Norton and Matchless production, the future was beginning to look rather bleak. In the sixties, with sales declining AMC made the commercial decision to focus on the Norton twins and the Matchless/AJS singles but they were not to be successful and the factory ceased production shortly afterwards.

Some models were "parts bin specials" put together at the request of the American dealers. The Americans were desert racing, so Berliners sent AMC an example custom bike using a Norton 750 motor in a G80CS frame, and asked them to build them some. This was the last Matchless motorcycle, the 748 cc G15 which was also sold as the AJS Model 33' and as the Norton P11. The G15 was produced up until 1969. A Mk2 version was sold in Britain from 1964.

Matchless/AJS built predictable handling, comfortable, well-made, reliable and economical motorcycles, for their day. Unfortunately such attributes were not enough to keep them in business. Continuing poor sales led to AMC becoming part of a new company, called Norton-Villiers in 1966. Some of the contents of the Norton factory including motorcycles were later auctioned off after the company went into receivership.

Four-stroke scrambler production ceased in 1966. Matchless became overshadowed with focusing on BSA, Triumph and Norton from 1960. The more race-worthy Matchless G85CS replaced the G80CS having a purpose-built frame, alloy fuel tank, ultralight hubs, 12:1 compression ratio and GP Amal (carburettor). Only 150 of these hand built bikes were made.

Vic Eastwood, Chris Horsfield, and Dave Nicoll were signed to race these Matchless Motocross bikes.

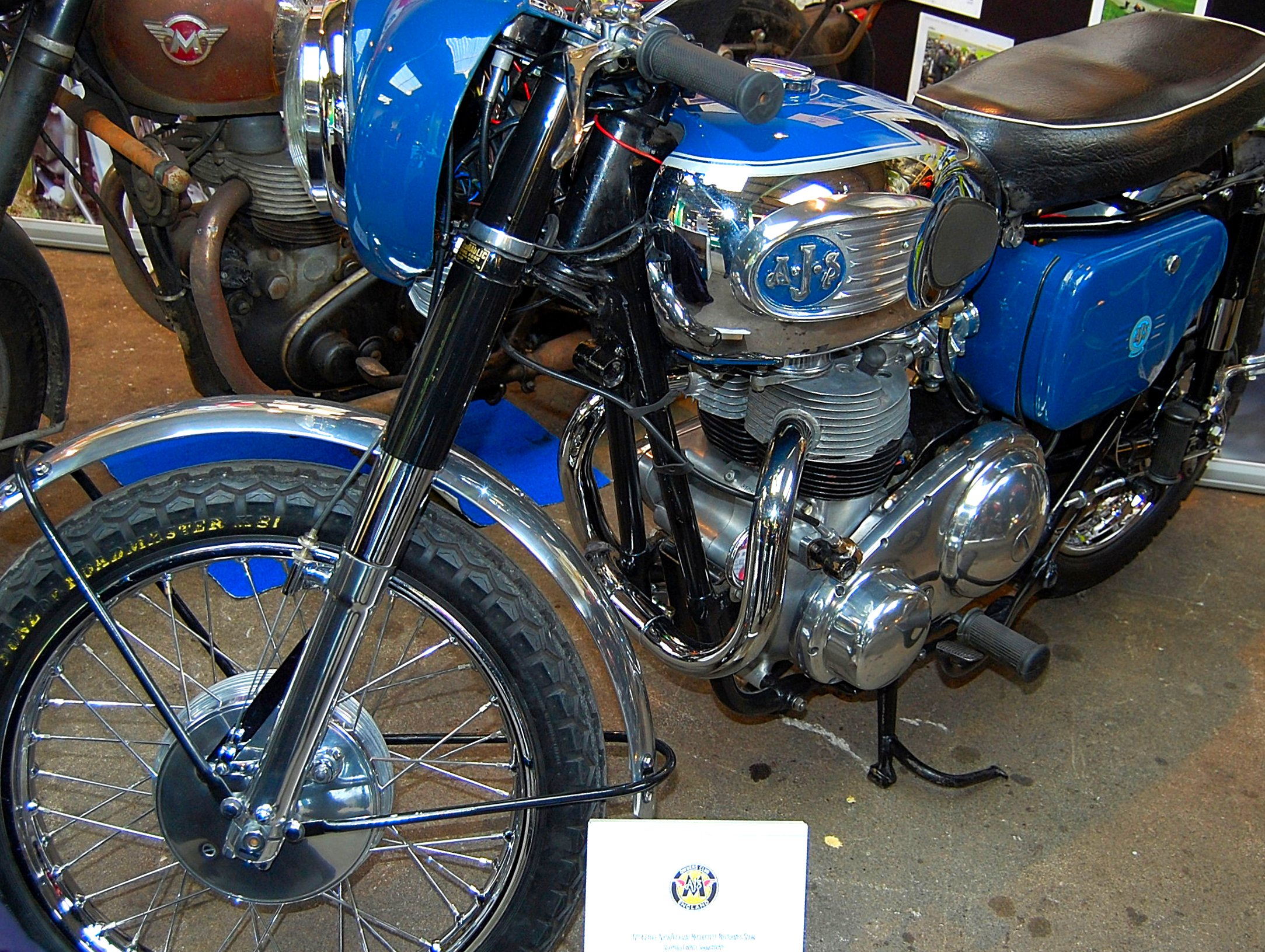
1961 AJS Model 31 650cc twin

== Decline ==
By the late 1960s, competition from Japan had driven the British motorcycle industry into a precipitous decline. In 1966 AMC collapsed and was reformed as Norton-Villiers under Manganese Bronze Holdings. This only staved off the problems for a little while and Norton-Villiers eventually went into liquidation in 1974. Norton was reformed with financial assistance from the British government as Norton Villiers Triumph (NVT) actually incorporating the majority of BSAs motorcycle concerns but omitting the BSA name for Triumph. In part due to a labour dispute, NVT later went into receivership in 1974.

== AJS Motorcycles 1974 – ==
Following the final collapse of NVT, the AJS name was bought by former works rider and competition manager Fluff Brown who continued production of the AJS Stormer in 250 and 360cc capacities. The company, AJS Motorcycles, still owned by the Brown family, now imports and retails small capacity motorcycles manufactured in China under the AJS name, whilst maintaining the spares supply for the Stormer models.

== See also ==
- List of AMC motorcycles
