= Ducati Bronco =

Ducati 125 Bronco
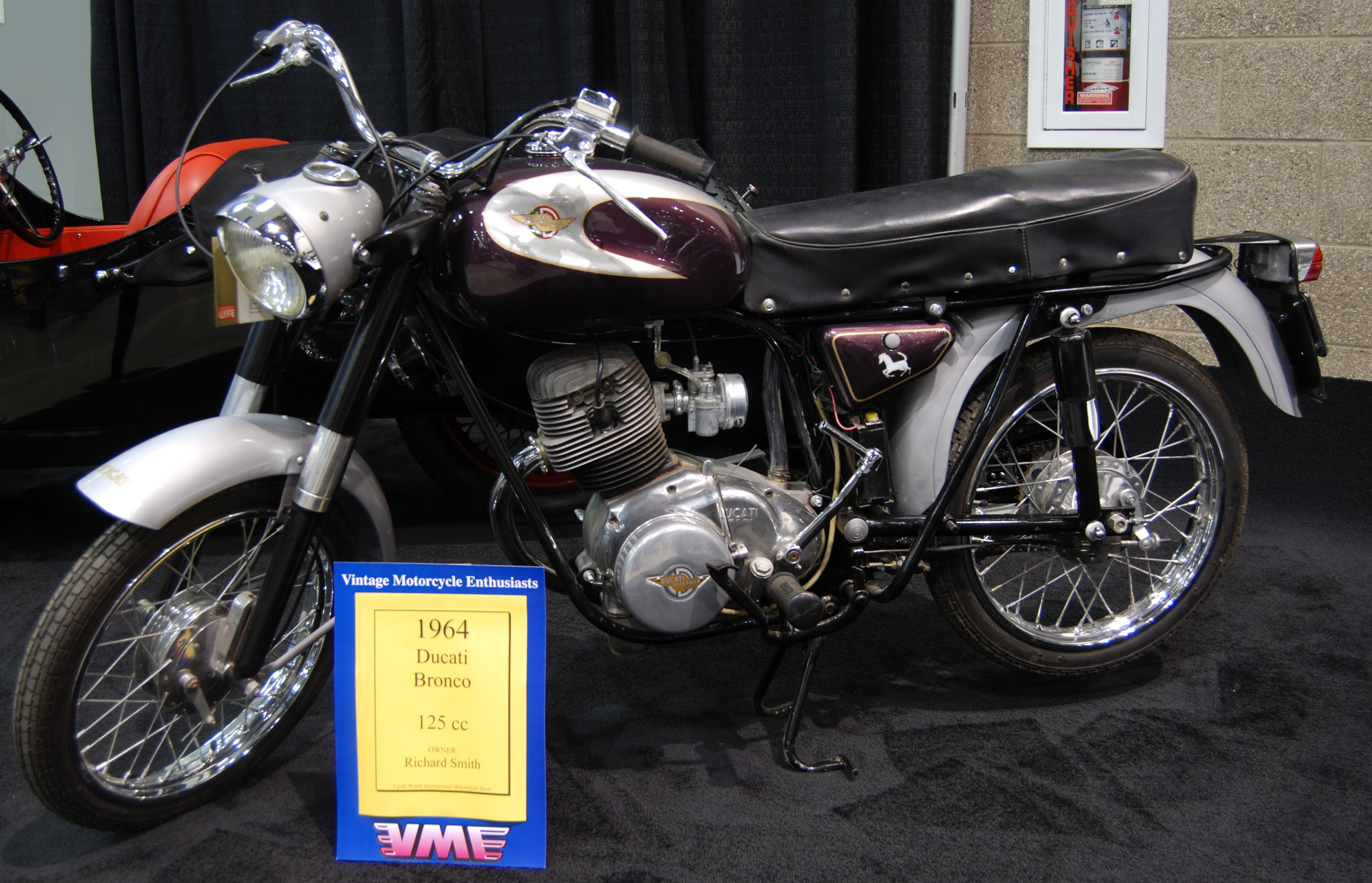
- Manufacturer: Ducati Meccanica S.p.A.
- Also called: 98 TS 1958-60, 98 Bronco/Cavallino 1959-63, 85 Turismo, 85 Sport 1958-60, 85 Bronco 1959-62; 125 Bronco 1960-66
- Production: 1960-1966
- Class: Standard
- Engine: Air-cooled single cylinder 4-stroke, 124.4 cc (7.59 cu in) displacement, 6.8:1 compression, 25° forward inclined
- Bore / stroke: 55.2 mm × 52 mm (2.17 in × 2.05 in)
- Top speed: 53 mph (85 km/h)
- Power: 6.5 bhp (4.8 kW) @ 6500 rpm
- Transmission: 4 speed manual. Gear ratios: I 1:2.69, II 1:1.85, III 1.36, IV 1:1. Chain 118 links 1/2" x 3/16" R-roller ∅ 8.51. Sprockets 17T front, 41T rear.
- Frame type: Tubular steel, duplex full cradle
- Suspension: Front: Marzocchi hydraulically damped telescopic fork. Rear: non-adjustable twin hydraulic shock swingarm.
- Brakes: Double shoe drum, front and rear, 123 mm dia. x 25 mm width, cable-operated
- Tires: 2.75 in × 16 in (70 mm × 406 mm), tube type on spoke rims
- Wheelbase: 1.29 m (4 ft 3 in)
- Dimensions: L: 1.9 m (6 ft 3 in); W: 0.82 m (2 ft 8 in); H: 0.98 m (3 ft 3 in)
- Seat height: 0.79 m (2 ft 7 in)
- Weight: 91 kg (201 lb) (dry); 102.8 kg (227 lb) (wet)
- Fuel capacity: 13 L (3.4 US gal)
- Oil capacity: 1.2 L (0.32 US gal)
- Fuel consumption: 99 mpg_{‑US} (2.4 L/100 km; 119 mpg_{‑imp}) at a cruising speed of 37–40 mph (60–64 km/h) (claimed)
- Related: 125 Aurea, 125TV and 125T

The 125 Bronco is a tubular steel/full-duplex-framed, base model motorcycle made by Ducati from 1960 to 1966, produced mainly for American distributor Berliner Motor Corporation. It was the second to last example, before the Ducati 125 Cadet/4, of Ducati pushrod technology which began in 1952 with the pressed-frame Ducati 98 models, which themselves had followed the Cucciolo T3, pull-rod (Ducati 60) and pushrod (60 Sport, 65 Sport, 65T Tourist) design singles.

A 1965 Bronco model was advertised for US$379, which would be US$ 2,580 in 2009 dollars, and touted as "America's most popular and reliable lightweight motorcycle." Bronco versions in 85 cc (5.2 cu in) (1959–62) and 98 cc (6.0 cu in) (1959–63) had also been produced.

== Description ==
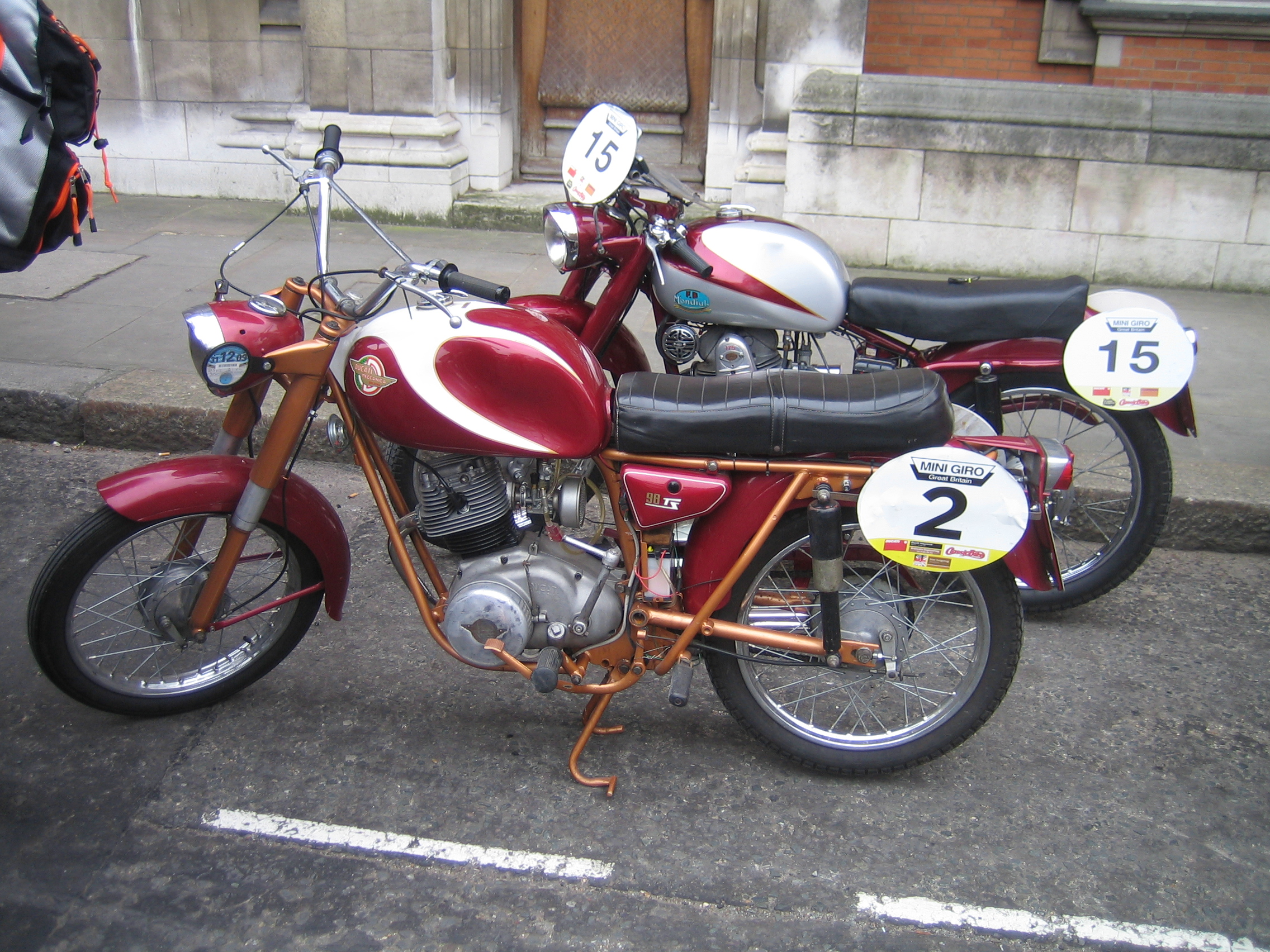
Visually, this 1958-60 98 TS is typical of this Ducati series. Some models had different fuel tanks, or had lower handlebars. Ducati Owners Club in the 2009 London Parade.

The bike's 124.4 cc (7.59 cu in) single-cylinder powerplant, redesigned for the 1958 125 Aurea, was an overhead valve pushrod engine made visually distinctive by a "Ducati Meccanica" winged laurel wreath and "D" logo cast in relief in brass on the left side aluminum flywheel cover. Mechanically, the new engine used an internal rather than external oil line feeding the upper valve train. The Aurea was styled like previous sporty standard models (Ducati 125 TV, 125 T), but had a 6V battery added to help the flywheel magneto power the lights and horn. For the 1960 Bronco, the Aurea's low, racing-style handlebar was replaced with a more upright touring handlebar, and a smaller gas tank, and smaller 16-inch, knobby tires were fitted.

The winged "D" emblem was repeated with a decal on the sides of the tank, along with a decal of a prancing horse (or "Cavallino Rampante") on the sides of the toolbox.

After the 125 Bronco and Cadet/4, Ducati made no further refinements of the OHV pushrod singles line that had begun with the Ducati 85, focusing instead on the OHC bevel drive and desmo singles, and ultimately twins, that were to become integral with the Ducati image.
