= Rokon =

Rokon may refer to:

- Rokon, South Sudan, a city in Central Equatoria
- Rokon (motorcycle manufacturer), a Rochester, New Hampshire-based motorcycle manufacturer
- Al Sahariar, a cricketer also known as Rokon
- a street in Saint Lawrence, Malta
