= List of James motorcycles =

This is a list of motorcycles produced by the James Cycle Co.

== 98cc ==
- Autocycle (Deluxe and Superluxe)
- Comet
- Commodore

== 125cc ==
- M.L. (1945–1948)
- Cadet 125 (Rigid-frame, J5, and J6)

== 150cc ==
- Cadet 150 (J15, L15, Flying Cadet L15a, Cadet M15, and Cadet M16)
- Scooter (SC1/SC4)

== 175cc ==
- Cavalier L17 (1958–1959)

== 200cc ==
- Captain (Rigid-frame, J8 Deluxe "Plunger", K7, L20, Sports Captain L20S)

== 225cc ==
- Colonel K12

== 250cc ==
- Commodore L25 (1957–1962)
- Superswift (1962–1963)
- L25T Commando (1959–1962)
- M25T Trials (1963–1966)
- Cotsworth L25S scrambles (1959–1962)
- M25R Scrambler and M25RS (1963–1966)
