= James Comet =

British motorcycle produced beginning in 1948

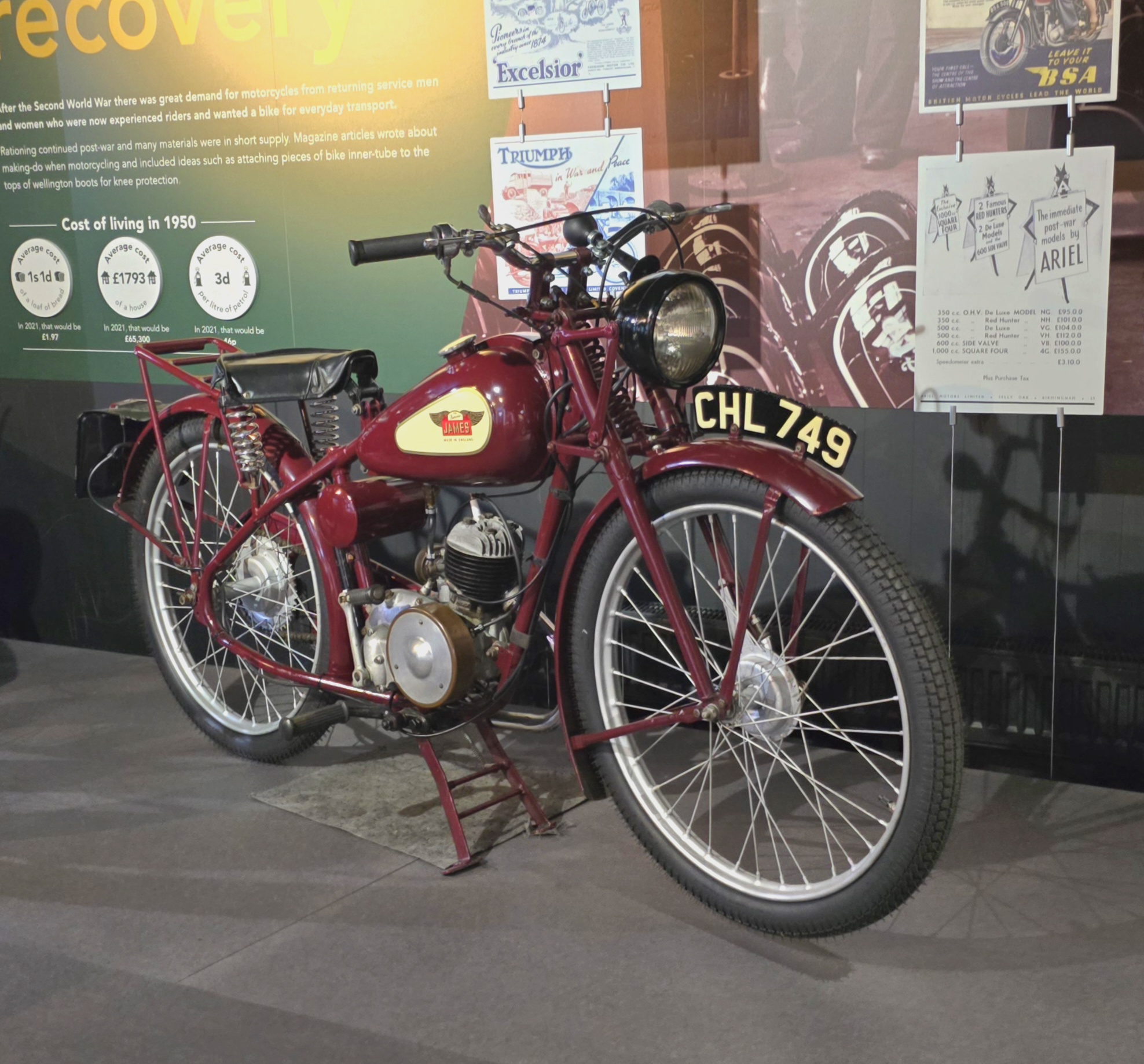
1950 James Comet in the Haynes International Motor Museum.

The James Comet was a 98 cubic centimetre (cc), two-stroke, motorcycle manufactured by the James Cycle Co. and announced on 21 October 1948. A post-World War II design, the Comet went into production in late 1948.

== Comet J1 / J3 / J10 rigid frame ==
- Engine: Villiers Engineering 1F engine at 98cc 47mm x 57mm engine. Late 1952 & 1953. the J3 Comet Deluxe models were fitted with the Villiers 4F engine. Carburetor was a Villiers Type 6/0.
- Transmission: Two speed with clutch. Handlebar gear lever has 'trigger'.
- Frame: Single downtube frame.
- Suspension: Front was taper tube for girder type with single, central undamped spring. Rear: None
- Brakes: 4" front and rear
- Drive: Chain and sprocket

== Comet J11 ==
The Comet J11 was manufactured from 1954 to 1955.

- Engine: Villiers Mk 4F (98cc) (47mm x 57mm), Carburetor was a Villiers Type 6/0
- Transmission: Two speed with clutch.
- Frame: Single down tube
- Suspension: Front was lightweight telescopic fork, plastic gaiters. Rear was a plunger-type.
- Brakes: 4" front, 5" rear
- Drive: Chain and sprocket

== Comet L1 ==
The Comet L1 was manufactured from 1956 to 1964.

- Engine: Villiers Mk 4F. Capacity 98cc, (47mm x 57mm). Villiers Mk 6F optional
- Transmission: Two speed with clutch.
- Frame: Tubular front and top rails. Pressed & fabricated central tub and swinging-arm.
- Suspension: Front was lightweight telescopic fork, plastic gaiters. Rear swingarm.
- Brakes: 4" front, 5" rear
- Drive: Chain and sprocket

== See also ==
- List of James motorcycles
- List of motorcycles of the 1940s
- List of motorcycles of the 1950s
