= Ducati Cucciolo =

Cucciolo
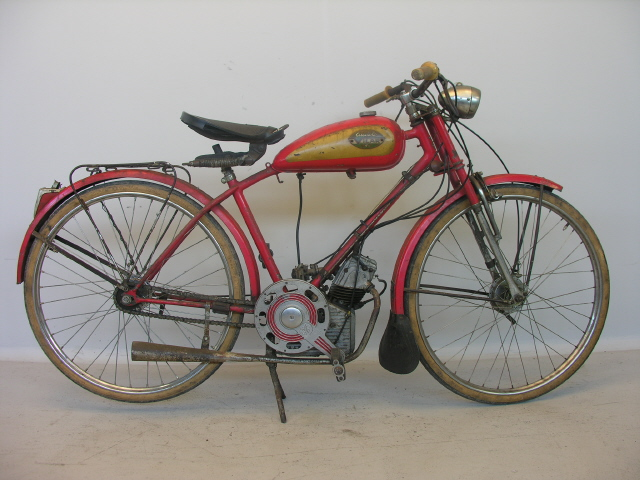
- Manufacturer: Ducati
- Production: 1946–1958
- Class: Motorized bicycle engine
- Engine: 48 cc (2.9 cu in) pullrod single
- Top speed: 40 mph (64 km/h)
- Weight: 98 lb (44 kg) (dry)

The Ducati Cucciolo was a 4-stroke clip-on engine for motorized bicycles conceived during and shortly after World War II by a Turin lawyer, Aldo Farinelli, and developed with a self-taught engineer, Aldo Leoni.

During the war, Aldo Farinelli began working with the small Turinese firm Siata (Società Italiana per Applicazioni Tecniche Auto-Aviatorie) with the idea of developing a small engine that could be mounted on a bicycle. Farinelli's and Leone's first prototype was running on the streets of Turin in Autumn of 1944. The yapping sound of the engine's short stubby exhaust inspired the name Cucciolo ("puppy") for the motor. Weighing a little over 17 pounds (7.7 kg) and giving 180 miles per US gallon (77 km/L) when installed in a bicycle.

On July 26, barely one month after the official liberation of the country, Siata announced their intention to sell Cucciolo engines to the public. It was the first new automotive design to appear in postwar Europe. Some businessmen bought the little engines in quantity and installed them in frames, thus offering for sale the first complete units.

Soon demand outstripped the limited production capabilities, so Siata found a manufacturing partner in Borgo Panigale, near Bologna. Ducati was a well-known name in electronics and appliances, and in the post-war torn Italy, it was seeking new opportunities to employ its workers and facilities, so a licensing agreement with Siata was reached. Production rose from 15 units in 1946 to over 25,000 in the following years, when Ducati reached an exclusive agreement for the production.

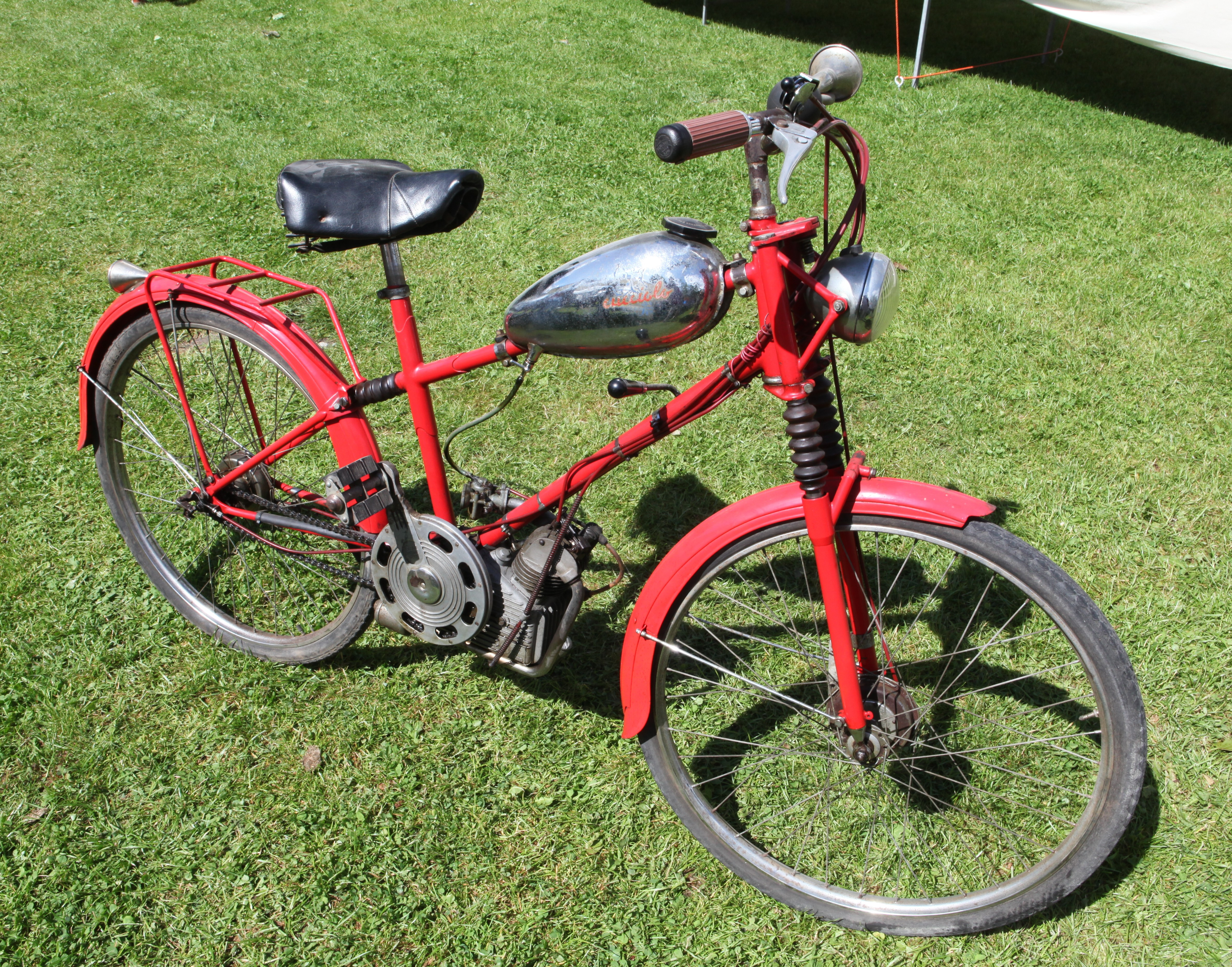
Ducati Cucciolo 1950–1951 with a 48 cc Ducati engine.

In 1952, with 200,000 Cucciolos already sold, Ducati finally offered its own complete moped based on the successful little pull rod engine, removing the pedals and adding a 3 speed gearbox, creating the model 48 (produced until 1954) and model 55E and 55R.

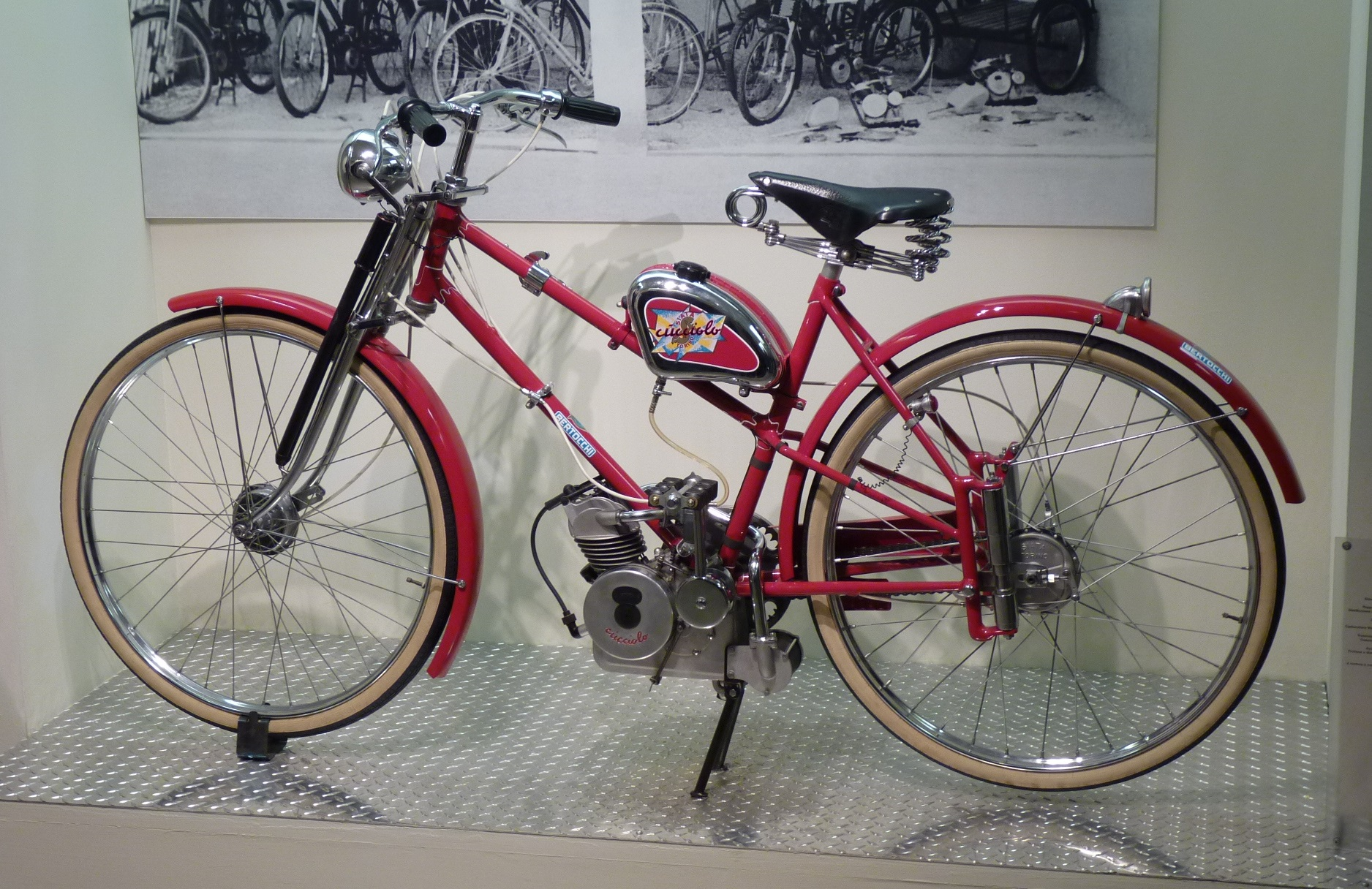
Siata-Ducati Cucciolo 50, 1946.

The model 48's fuel tank was integrated into the frame, and a swingarm type rear suspension. The following models were becoming more and more real motorcycles, with pressed-steel frames. The engine capacity grew to 60 cc, models 60 and 60 Sport, and finally to 65 cc, 65 Sport, 65T, 65TL and 65TS.

The Cucciolo engine was gradually replaced by the 98 model line which started in 1952 and its production ended when the 65 line was dropped in 1958.

== See also ==
- List of motorcycles of the 1940s
- List of motorcycles of the 1950s
