= James Autocycle =

20th-century motorcycle

The James Autocycle was a 98 cc (6.0 cu in) two-stroke, autocycle manufactured by the James Cycle Co from 1946 to 1953.

A pre-Second World War design, the autocycle continued in production until late 1953 with a Villiers Engineering Junior De Luxe 98cc engine in a typical autocycle frame. The bike was available in Deluxe and Superlux models.

== Deluxe ==
The James Deluxe Autocycle was manufactured from 1946 to 1949 and has a 50 mm × 50 mm (2.0 in × 2.0 in) engine fed with a Villiers Junior carburettor and driven by one gear and a clutch. The frame was a single downtube and rigid frame. The front fork is a central undamped spring. Original tyres were Dunlop Carrier 26 inch by 2 inch (oversized) and rims are Dunlop WMO 36 hole in a silver argenized color. The drive train was chain and sprocket. Braking was through front and rear four inch drum brakes. Lighting provided by a six volt lamp on the front and four volt for the tail light.

== Superlux ==
The James Superlux Autocycle was manufactured from 1950 to 1953. The engine was a single speed Villiers Mk 2F with 98cc displacement at 47 mm × 57 mm (1.9 in × 2.2 in). The frame was a single tube rigid type, front fork was like that of the Deluxe. Tyres were 21 x 2.35 inches, rims were the colour the same as the Deluxe. Drive train, braking and lighting were identical to the Deluxe.

== See also ==
- List of James motorcycles
- List of motorcycles of the 1940s
- List of motorcycles of the 1950s
