= Marman Twin =

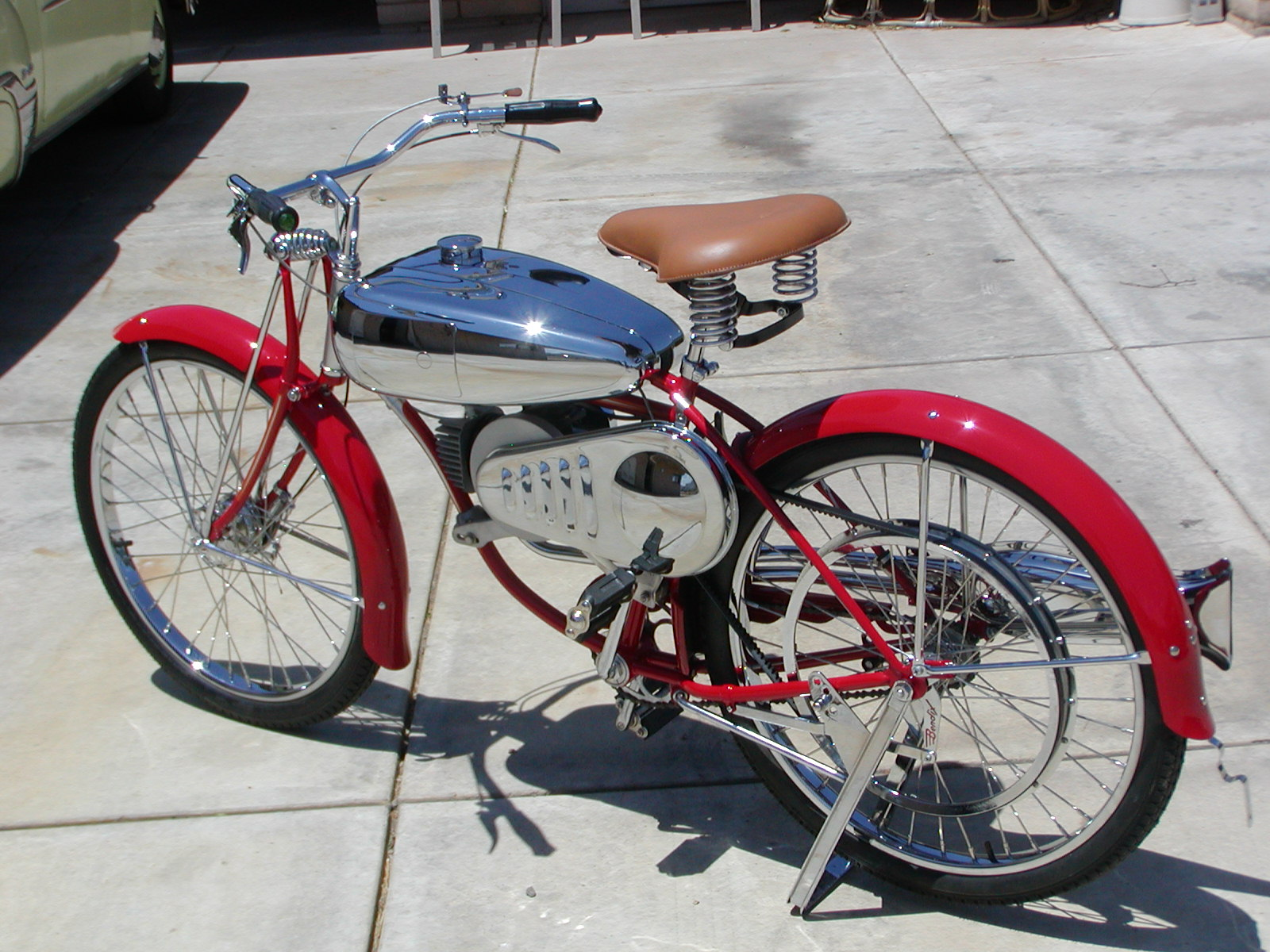
- Manufacturer: Marman Products
- Production: 1948–1949
- Class: Motorized bicycle
- Frame type: Schwinn MP97 bicycle

The Marman Twin was a motorcycle produced by Marman Products of Inglewood, California (owned by Herbert "Zeppo" Marx) in 1948 and 1949. The engine was a drone airplane engine from World War II, manufactured by Jack & Heintz Aircraft Co.

== See also ==
- List of motorcycles of the 1940s
- List of motorcycles of the 1950s
