= Ducati Aurea =

Ducati 125 Aurea
- Manufacturer: Ducati Meccanica S.p.A.
- Production: 1958-1962
- Class: Standard
- Engine: Air-cooled single cylinder 4-stroke, 124.4 cc (7.59 in^{3}) displacement, 55.2 mm ∅ x 52 mm, 6.8:1 compression, 25° forward inclined. Dell'Orto MB18BS carburetor.
- Top speed: 53 mph (85 km/h)
- Power: 6.5 bhp (4.8 kW) @ 6500 rpm
- Transmission: 4 speed manual. Gear ratios: I 1:2.69, II 1:1.85, III 1.36, IV 1:1. Chain 118 links 1/2" x 3/16" R-roller ∅ 8.51. Sprockets 17T front, 41T rear.
- Suspension: Front: Marzocchi hydraulically damped telescopic fork. Rear: non-adjustable twin hydraulic shock swingarm.
- Brakes: expanding double shoe drum, front and rear, 123 mm ∅ x 25 mm width, cable-operated
- Tires: 2.75 in x 16 in, tube type on spoke rims
- Wheelbase: 1.2586 mm (0.04955 in)
- Dimensions: L: 1,920 mm (76 in); H: 910 mm (36 in)
- Seat height: 790 mm (31 in)
- Weight: 90 kg (200 lb) (dry); 103.3 kg (228 lb) (wet)
- Fuel capacity: 15 L (4.0 US gal)
- Oil capacity: 1.2 L (0.32 US gal)
- Related: 125 Bronco, 125TV and 125T

The Ducati 125 Aurea is a Ducati motorcycle made from 1958 to 1962; it was only superficially different from the Bronco of 1960 to 1966.

The process that produced the Aurea, and the Bronco that followed, was a form of motorcycle marketing that was practiced with this marque at the time. Ducati's American importer, Berliner Motor Corporation would fly their US dealers to Italy to view the models in Ducati's lineup, alongside a choice of handlebars, seats, gas tanks and fenders that would fit on that model, and the dealers would pick which components in combination with which bike would most likely sell in the US market. By this process, the 125 cc full-cradle framed 125 TV ended up with the stylish sporty fuel tank of the 125 Sport, a much higher spec model. Two years later, the Aurea would have its low, racing or "drag bar" style handle bars replaced with upright touring handlebars, and have added knobby, off-road tires, producing the 125 Bronco.

== See also ==
- List of motorcycles of the 1950s
