= Matchless G80 =

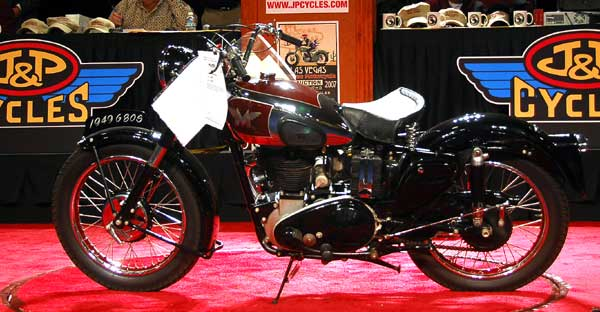
- Manufacturer: Associated Motor Cycles (AMC) (London)
- Production: 1949 to 1966
- Engine: 498cc Single cylinder, pushrod 2 valve, 4 stroke
- Power: 28 bhp (21 kW) @ 5,600 rpm
- Transmission: 4-speed AMC gearbox to final drive chain
- Wheelbase: 1,397 mm (55.0 in)
- Seat height: 762 mm (30.0 in)
- Weight: 179 kg (395 lb) (dry)

The Matchless G80 is a single cylinder 500 cc British motorcycle built by Associated Motorcycles (AMC) between 1946 and 1966. During the 1950s and 1960s, the main export product for AMC was the AJS/Matchless range – the road bikes were very similar, often with only the badges distinguishing one marque from the other; the equivalent AJS being the Model 18.

== Development ==
In the early 1950s, the most popular British four-strokes were still pushrod singles. The Matchless G80 is typical of this era. The earliest G80 is sometimes referred to as a G80L, the L signifying "Teledraulic" forks, rather than girder forks.

The magneto on an AJS was in front of the cylinder, and the Matchless magneto was behind. A design originating in the 1930s, the Matchless was updated with a spring frame (swingarm) rear suspension in 1949, becoming the G80S. The suspension was a vast improvement on the bouncy rigid rear end but wheel travel was limited.

AMC had adopted Velocette's twin-shock swingarm rear suspension design for its top models. Vertical shock absorber units were introduced in 1949. The initial "Candlestick" shocks held only 50 cc of SAE 20 weight oil. Leak prone, they were replaced by the "Jampot" shocks in 1951, and by Girling shocks in 1956. In 1957, AMC switched from Burman gearboxes to their own make.

The leaky pressed-steel primary chain-case first appeared on AMC machines in the 1930s. In 1958 an alloy cover primary chain-case became available.

== Engine ==
The engine was released with a compression ratio of 5.9:1, because of the poor quality fuel available in the United Kingdom immediately after the Second World War. In 1949 the hairpin valve springs were back, after the use of conventional coil valve springs in wartime engines. By 1951 the G80 had an alloy cylinder head and the barrel fins now went all the way to the base on competition models. The compression ratio was increased to 7.3:1 in 1956.

Low compression meant that it was easy to kick-start and was more flexible at low revs. The earlier long stroke version might not quite reach 80 miles per hour (130 km/h), but it could trundle along at less than 20 miles per hour (32 km/h) in top gear. It also gave good fuel economy.

== Model variations ==
The 500 cc "long stroke" G80CS was produced from 1951 through 1955. In 1956 it was replaced by the shorter stroke, larger bore models that used the same numeric codes. The bore of these early G80CS's was 82.5 mm (3.25"), while the 1956 through 1966 "short stroke" (final version) models had a bore of 86 mm. The C is for Competition (Scrambles) and the S for Suspension (not a rigid rear frame).

Matchless also made a 600 cc version of the G80 called Typhoon from 1959 to 1962. The engine prefix code was TCS on these bikes. The bore was increased to 89 mm, while the stroke was increased from 85.5 mm to a whopping 96 mm. Based on the number of currently known TCS's on the Typhoon register kept by Rick Mann, it is now estimated that 225 to 300 were made by the factory over a four-year period, and almost all of them were sold in the US. The rarest of these is the single down tube framed version, the 1959 G80TCS, and its even rarer identical sister the 1959 AJS 18TCS. This one year only variant with a slightly smaller cylinder capacity, had a frame that when thrashed was less robust than the models that followed. Nevertheless, it is often favored over the duplex framed TCS models (1960 to 1962) because of its lighter weight and easier maneuverability. There was a road model with lights and a competition model without lights.

Engine numbers usually start with the year of production, followed by model designation, and completed with the production number of the motorcycle.

=== Les Harris Matchless G80 ===
Launched in 1987 by motorcycle spares businessman, Les Harris, and designed by Brian Jones, a new "Matchless G80" single was released powered by an Austrian Rotax 4-stroke, single over-head cam (SOHC), 500cc engine. Components from Italy such as front and rear Paioli suspension, Dellorto carburetor, Lafranconi silencers and Brembo disc brakes were used whilst, harking back to his licence-built Triumph Bonneville T140s, the frame doubled up as the oil tank. German components included the Varta battery and Magura switchgear. The model was offered in colours of silver, black or metallic burgundy. Although electric start and twin disc brakes were options, priced at £2700 (£500 more than a Yamaha motorcycle of similar specification), this was not a successful machine and production ended by 1990.

== See also ==
- List of motorcycles of the 1940s
- List of motorcycles of the 1950s
