= AJS 18 =

AJS Model 18 and Model 18S
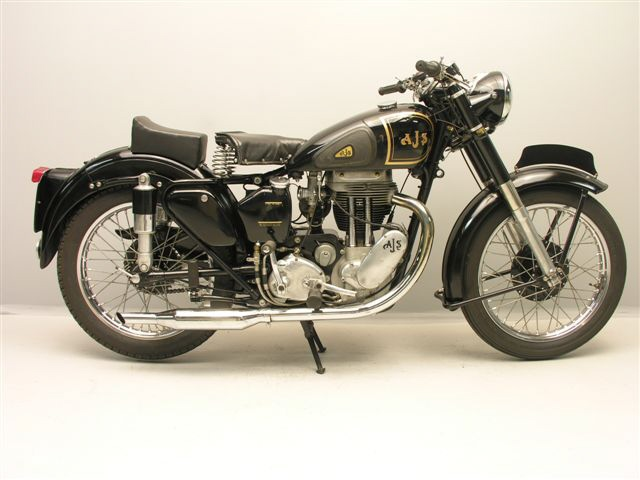
- Manufacturer: Associated Motor Cycles (AMC) (London)
- Also called: 'The Statesman' (mid-1960s only). Ajay. Jampot.
- Production: 1945 to 1966
- Engine: 498 cc Single cylinder, pushrod 2 valve, 4 stroke
- Bore / stroke: 82.5 mm × 93 mm (3.25 in × 3.66 in); 86 mm × 85.5 mm (3.39 in × 3.37 in)
- Power: 28bhp @ 5600rpm (late models)
- Transmission: 4-speed AMC gearbox to final drive chain
- Wheelbase: 55 inches (140 cm)
- Dimensions: H: 30 inches (76 cm)
- Seat height: 30 inches (76 cm)
- Weight: 394 pounds (179 kg) (dry)
- Fuel capacity: 3 gallons

The AJS 500cc Model 18 and AJS Model 18S are 500 cc British motorcycles almost identical to the Matchless G80 and both were produced in the same Associated Motor Cycles (AMC) London factory from 1945 to 1966. These bikes represent the end of the era of big British singles, as when AMC merged with Norton production concentrated on twins.

== Development ==
The AJS Model 18 was developed from a design from the 1930s, despite which it was still being manufactured 30 years later. The AJS was updated when a springer frame rear suspension was made available for 1949, to become the Model 18S. The suspension was a vast improvement on the rigid rear end - which had given a bouncy ride. Each of the two 'Candlestick' shocks held only 50 cc of SAE 20 weight oil. They were prone to leaks and were replaced by the larger diameter 'Jampot' shocks on the 1951 version.

== Engine ==
The engine was released just postwar with a compression ratio of 5.9:1, necessary because of the low quality fuel available in Britain immediately after the War. British singles were designed to make the best of the fuel available. Post-war petrol rationing continued until 1950 and it was several years before performance fuels were generally available in the UK. The Model 18's low compression did mean it was easy to start and the model 18s had better performance and fuel economy than the fast cars of the time.

By 1951 the model 18 had an alloy cylinder head and the competition models had also an alloy cylinder (with steel liner), where the barrel fins went all the way to the base. The magneto was moved in front of the cylinder on the Matchless G80 for 1952. The earlier model did not have a magdyno - the separate magneto was directly above the dynamo behind the cylinder. The leaky pressed-steel primary chain-case that first appeared in early times had a small clutch inspection/adjustment plate added in 1952 and in 1954 the whole clutch dome was replaceable in it. The compression ratio was increased to 8.7:1 in 1956 and in 1958 an alloy cover primary chain-case became available.

The unreliable 'jampot' shock absorbers were replaced with Girling shocks in 1956 and in 1957 AMC switched from Burman gearboxes to their own make. In 1960 the model 18 gained a duplex frame.

== Models ==
The 500 cc "long stroke" AJS 18CS was produced from 1951 through 1955. In 1956 it was replaced by the shorter stroke, larger bore models that used the same numeric codes. The bore of these early models was 82.5 mm (3.25 in), while the 1956 through 1966 "short stroke" (final version) models had a bore of 86 mm (3.39 in). The C was for Competition (Scrambles) and the S for Suspension (not a rigid rear frame).

Engine numbers usually start with the year of production, followed by model designation, and completed with the production number of the motorcycle

The AJS and Matchless singles were doomed when AMC merged with Norton as all production was transferred to twin-cylinder bikes - so the short-stroke Model 18 is the end of an era.

== See also ==
- List of motorcycles of the 1940s
- List of motorcycles of the 1950s
