= Royal Enfield Fury =

Royal Enfield Fury Motorcycle

- Manufacturer: Royal Enfield
- Production: 1959–1963
- Engine: 499 cc (30.5 cu in) air-cooled single
- Transmission: 4-speed, chain final drive

The Royal Enfield Fury is a British motorcycle made by Royal Enfield at their factory in Redditch. The Fury name has also been used by Royal Enfield Motors in India for a 175 cc motorcycle and for a new 499 cc single in their range for 2011.

== Development ==
Launched in 1959, the 499 cc Fury was planned for the US export market to compete against the BSA Gold Star and Velocette Venom. Developed from the Royal Enfield Bullet and sharing many of the cycle parts, the Fury had an aluminium alloy barrel with cast iron liner and a high compression piston. The engine was specially tuned to increase the Bullet's 27 hp (20 kW) to 40 bhp (30 kW).

Intended for serious off-road and competition use, the Fury was supplied with optional lights, mounting an optional rev counter, an 18-inch (460 mm) rear wheel and a 19-inch (480 mm) front wheel. Only 191 Furies were made between 1959 and 1963, when production ended.

== Enfield Fury 175 ==
The 'Fury' name was revived by Enfield India for a licensed copy of the German Zündapp KS175. Royal Enfield (India) assembled the 163 cc Fury from parts imported from Germany when Zündapp Motorcycles ceased production and closed their factories in 1984. It had five-speed gearbox, a hydraulic Brembo disc brake and a sleeveless hard chromed cylinder barrel, all were a first on a motorcycle in that country.

== 2011 Royal Enfield Fury ==
The Royal Enfield Fury name has been used again for a new 499 cc single-cylinder model by Royal Enfield India and forms part of their range for 2011. The new Fury has fuel injection and is the first Royal Enfield motorcycle in 40 years with twin exhaust pipes. The new Fury is supplied with a chrome headlight and digital instruments, with a fibreglass single seat unit incorporating a rear light. With maximum power of 27.2 hp (20.3 kW) at 5250 rpm, however, the new Fury has more in common with the modern Royal Enfield Electra than the original Fury of 1959.

== See also ==
- List of motorcycles of the 1950s
