= Ducati 98 =

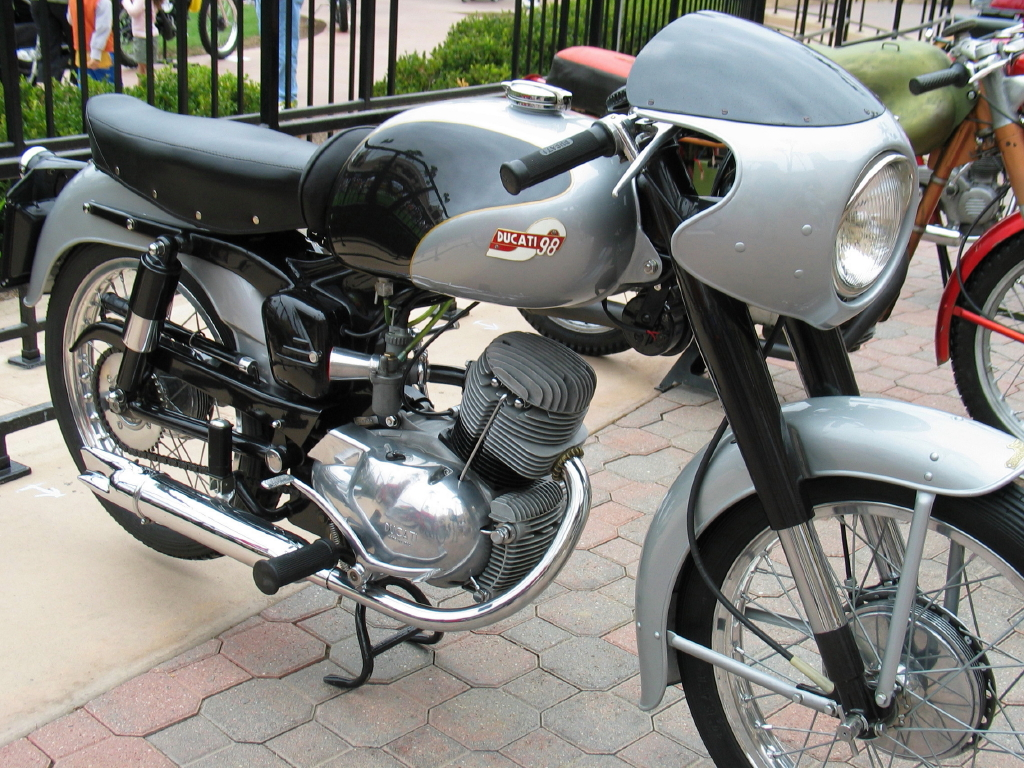
- Manufacturer: Ducati Meccanica S.p.A.
- Also called: 98, 98N, 98T, 98TL, 98 Sport, 98 Super Sport (in 1952 the 98T was listed as the Cavalline)
- Production: 98 1952-55, 98N 1956-57, 98T, 98TL 1953-58, 98S 1953-56, 98SS 1956-57
- Predecessor: Ducati 65T, 65TL, 65TS
- Class: Standard
- Engine: Air-cooled single cylinder 4-stroke OHV pushrod, 98.058 cc displacement, 49 mm ∅ x 52 mm, 8:1 compression: 98, 98N, 98T, 98TL 8:1. 98S 9:1. 98SS 10:1. wet sump lubrication.
- Top speed: 98 75 km/h (47 mph). 98N 80 km/h (50 mph). 98T, 98TL 75 km/h (47 mph). 98S90 km/h (56 mph). 98SS 95 km/h (59 mph).
- Power: 98, 98N 5.5 bhp (4.1 kW) @ 6,800. 98T, 98TL 5.8 bhp (4.3 kW) @ 7,500. 98S, 98SS '53-54 6.8 bhp (5.1 kW) @ 7,800 rpm 98 Sport & SS '55-58 6.5 bhp (4.8 kW) at 7,000 rpm
- Transmission: 3 speed 98,98N,98T, 4 speed 98TL 98S,98SS
- Suspension: front: telescopic fork, rear: swing arm. Spring with hydraulic damping.
- Brakes: front: 6-1/4 in. drum, rear: 5-3/8 in. drum
- Tires: front: 2.5 in x 17 in. Rear: 2.75 in x 17 in.
- Wheelbase: 98, 98N 1,240 mm (49 in). 98T, 98TL 1,245 mm (49.0 in) 98S, 98SS 1,200 mm (47 in)
- Dimensions: L: 98, 98N 1,800 mm (71 in). 98T, 98TL 1,890 mm (74 in) 98S, 98SS n/a W: 660 mm (26 in); H: 960 mm (38 in)
- Seat height: 98, 98N 730 mm (29 in). 98T, 98TL 762 mm (30.0 in) 98S, 98SS 760 mm (30 in)
- Weight: 98 72 kg (159 lb). 98N 81 kg (179 lb). 98T 88 kg (194 lb). 98TL 89 kg (196 lb). 98S 81 kg (179 lb). 98SS 79 kg (174 lb) (dry)
- Fuel capacity: 3.75 US gal (14.2 L)
- Fuel consumption: 120-130 mpg, 140 mpg claimed

The Ducati 98, 98N, 98T, 98TL, 98 Sport (98S) and 98 Super Sport (98SS) were a series of single-cylinder OHV, open-cradle pressed-steel frame motorcycles made by Ducati Meccanica from 1952 to 1958. The 98 Sport sold in London in 1956 for £178 10s, which would be £5,627 as of 2023, after inflation.

Ducati was one of several Italian companies that did well in the 1950s with lightweight sporting motorcycles like the 98, especially the 98 Sport, because production recovered relatively quickly after World War II, and because the designers understood that "a model with a racing pedigree, stylish looks, and a bit of excitement was, in the Italian designer's mind, likely to sell in larger numbers than a dull looker, no matter how well engineered, comfortable, and practical."

== Development ==
The series was envisioned as a "bare-bones low performance model," but the 98 Sport of 1953 became Ducati's "first true sporting model." The new design by Ducati's chief engineer, Giovanni Fiorio, made its debut at the 1952 Milan Show with the showing of the 98N and 98T (with twin seat). The following year, the 98 Sport was presented at the same show, a lighter bike with alloy instead of chrome steel rims, and a higher state of tune, and the addition of a finned oil cooler at the front of the engine.

Although the 98 had some success in competition, its limitations made Ducati Director Giuseppe Montano decide to begin a racing program led by a new engineer, Fabio Taglioni. Though Taglioni mainly worked on the new OHC bikes, he might have influenced the 98S of 1954.

== Popularity ==
Reviewers at the time found the bike expensive, but were generally positive, liking the sporting feel of the suspension, gearing and brakes, as well praising the fuel economy and the Italian styling. The series would prove to be one of Ducati's most successful early efforts. The price, performance, and stylish looks of the 98S became popular in the Italian la passeggiata (street cruising scene) of the era and sold well in the home market.

Today the 98 Sport is the model of this series most sought after by collectors and restorers. The other versions, while originally more numerous, today suffer from a scarcity of parts and relatively low resale value.

Though similar in name, the Ducati 98 TS (aka 98 Bronco) was different than the earlier 98 range, having a milder-tuned engine (7:1 compression) and a new duplex full-cradle tubular steel frame.

== 98 Super Sport mystery ==
There are questions as to the existence of the 98 Super Sport, as a distinct model from the 98 Sport. While authors Ian Falloon and Mick Walker describe such a version, saying it was faster and lighter than the 98 Sport, with Walker adding that the 98 SS is very rare and sought after by collectors, other evidence, such as photographs of the elusive 98 SS, is lacking. One explanation is that the name "Super Sport" was used instead of "Sport" after 1955 as a marketing label, rather than a technical distinction, to describe the last, and best performing, of the 98 Sport models.

== See also ==
- List of motorcycles of the 1950s
