= Ezra Baya Lawiri =

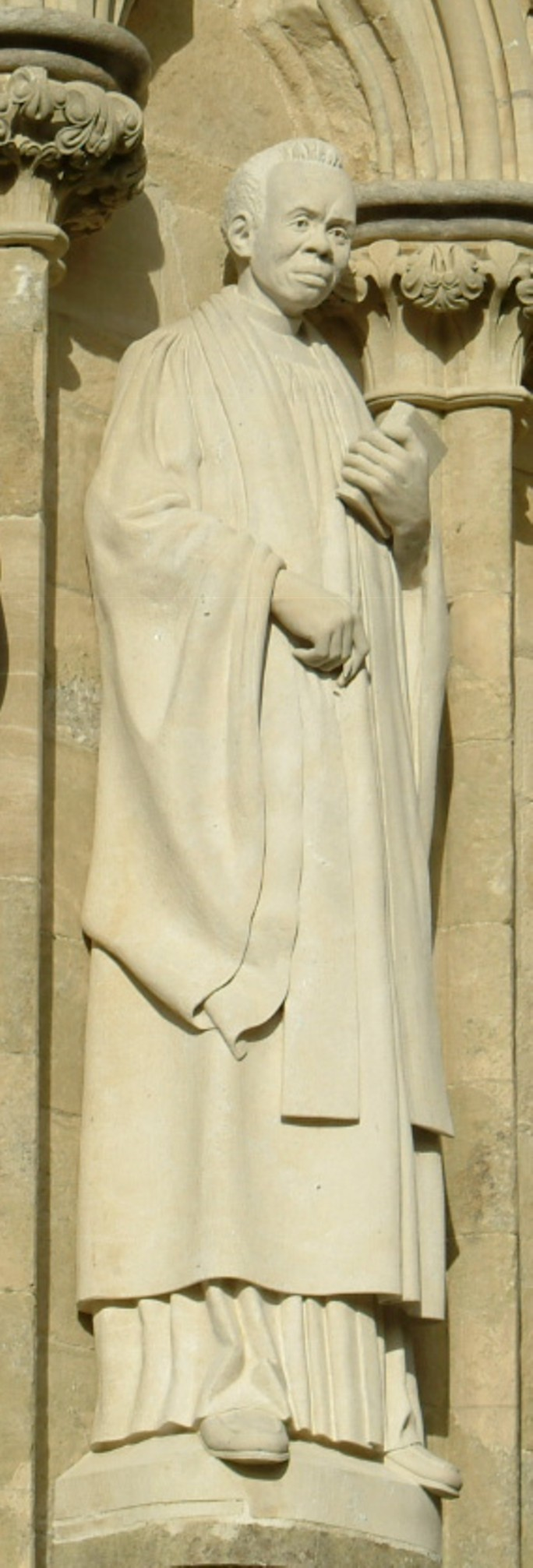
Lawiri's statue on the Great West Front of Salisbury Cathedral

Ezra Baya Lawiri (c. 1917 – 29 March 1991) was a Sudanese teacher, Episcopalian priest and scholar, responsible for translating The Bible into the Moru language. He is commemorated by a statue in niche 174 on the Great West Front of Salisbury Cathedral.

== Early life ==
He was born in Lanyi, in Sudan and attended school there from 1927. He then went to Lui Elementary Vernacular School (CMS) in 1930 for two years. He was appointed sub-grade teacher at the age of 15 and later attended a training course for teachers in 1937.

Baya Lawiri committed himself to Christianity in 1934 and was baptised Ezra. In 1936 while working at Kedi’ba Village School he met his wife Hanna and they were married the same year. They later produced six children – three boys and six girls. In 1937 Ezra was transferred to Mideh sub-grade school as headmaster where he worked until 1944.

In 1945 he attended an evangelism course at Yei Divinity School. In 1948 he began theological studies at Bishop Gwynne College in Mundri graduating in 1949. He was ordained as a deacon in the same year and then ordained as a priest in 1950. He was appointed pastor in the parish of Mundri for 4 years. He then transferred to Lui parish as pastor-in-charge. In 1959 Ezra went to the London School of Divinity where he graduated with a diploma in theology. From there he went to Bishop Gwynne College as vice-principal. He became the college's first indigenous principal in 1963, holding the post until 1965.

== Exile in Uganda ==
In 1965 the Anya Nya War in Sudan intensified and reached Mundri causing Ezra and students from the college to flee into exile in Uganda. He continued teaching in accommodation provided by The Church of Uganda until the students graduated in 1967. At about this time he started translating The Bible into the Moru language while working in the Nabumali Secondary School in Mbale, Uganda.

== Return to Sudan ==
Ezra continued with this work until the war ended in 1972 and he returned to Sudan in 1973. He also updated the Moru Prayer and Hymn Book. A new civil war started in 1983, and in 1988 all staff and students from Bishop Gwynne College were relocated to Juba. However, Lawiri chose to stay in Mundri. In March 1991 the government army retreated from Mundri towards Juba taking 2000 civilians including Ezra Lawiri and his family. The SPLA eventually caught up with the fleeing army and followers and a battle ensued.

== Death ==
On Good Friday, March 29, 1991, Lawiri was fatally wounded by an artillery shell; his daughter Cecilia Baya was also killed the next day. He was buried the next day in Rokon. The rest of his family survived; with three grandchildren injured but they continued to Juba.

== Commemoration ==
In July 2008 a statue of Lawiri was installed in niche 174 on the Great West Front of Salisbury Cathedral. It was carved by sculptor Jason Battle.
