= List of motorcycles of the 1940s =

This a listing of motorcycles of the 1940s, including those on sale, introduced, or otherwise relevant in this period.

== Motorcycle ==
- Acme motorcycle (1939–49)
- AJS 18
- AJS 7R
- AJS Model 16
- AJS Model 20
- AJS Porcupine
- Ariel Red Hunter
- Ariel W/NG 350
- BMW R24
- BMW R75
- BSA A7
- BSA B31
- BSA Bantam
- BSA M20
- Dnepr M-72
- Douglas Mark III
- Ducati 60
- Ducati 60 Sport
- Ducati 65 Sport
- Ducati Cucciolo
- Fuji Rabbit
- Harley-Davidson FL
- Harley-Davidson Hummer
- Harley-Davidson Servi-Car
- Harley-Davidson WLA
- Harley-Davidson XA
- Honda D-Type
- Imme R100
- Indian 841
- Indian Four (until 1942)
- James Autocycle
- James Comet
- Lambretta Model B
- Marman Twin
- Matchless G80
- Mitsubishi Silver Pigeon
- Norton Dominator
- Norton 16H
- OEC
- Sunbeam S7 and S8
- Triumph Speed Twin
- Triumph Tiger 100
- Triumph 3HW
- Type 97 motorcycle
- Vincent Black Lightning
- Vincent Black Shadow
- Vincent Comet
- Vincent Grey Flash
- Vincent Rapide
- Vincent Meteor
- Welbike
- Zündapp KS 750

== Gallery ==
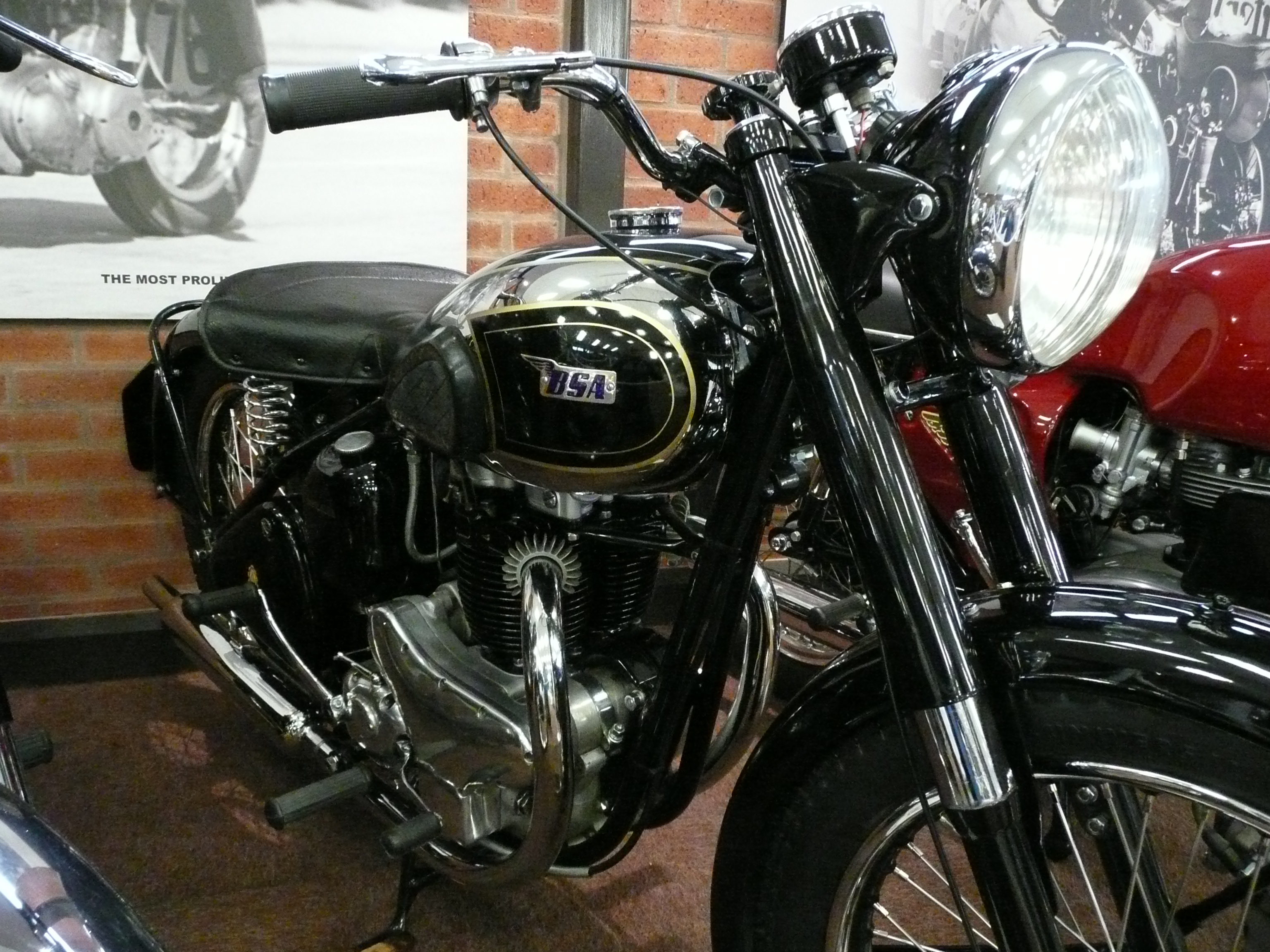
BSA A7, produced 1946–1961.

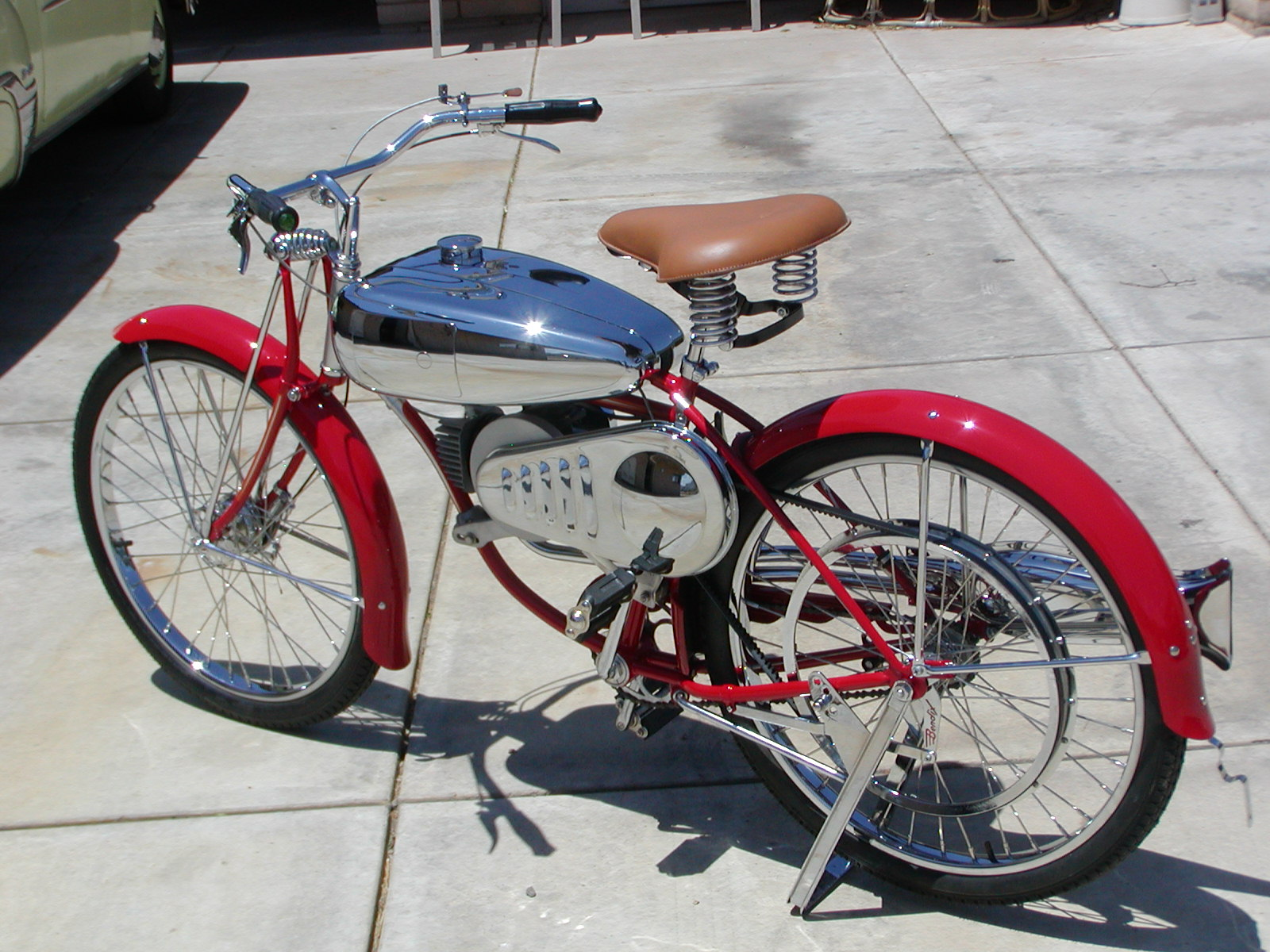
The Marman Twin was made in 1948 and 1949

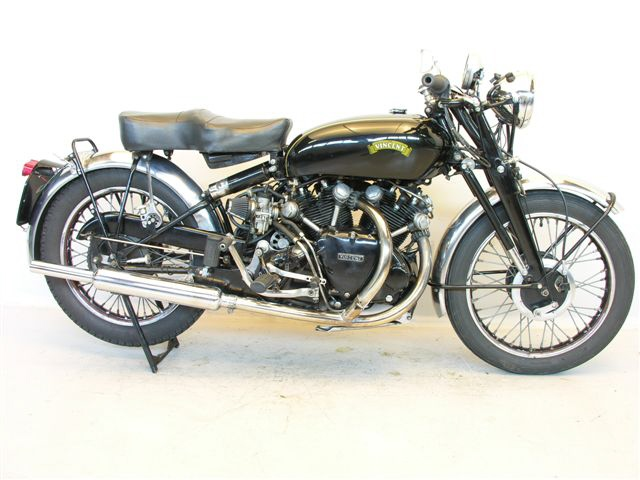
Vincent Black Shadow

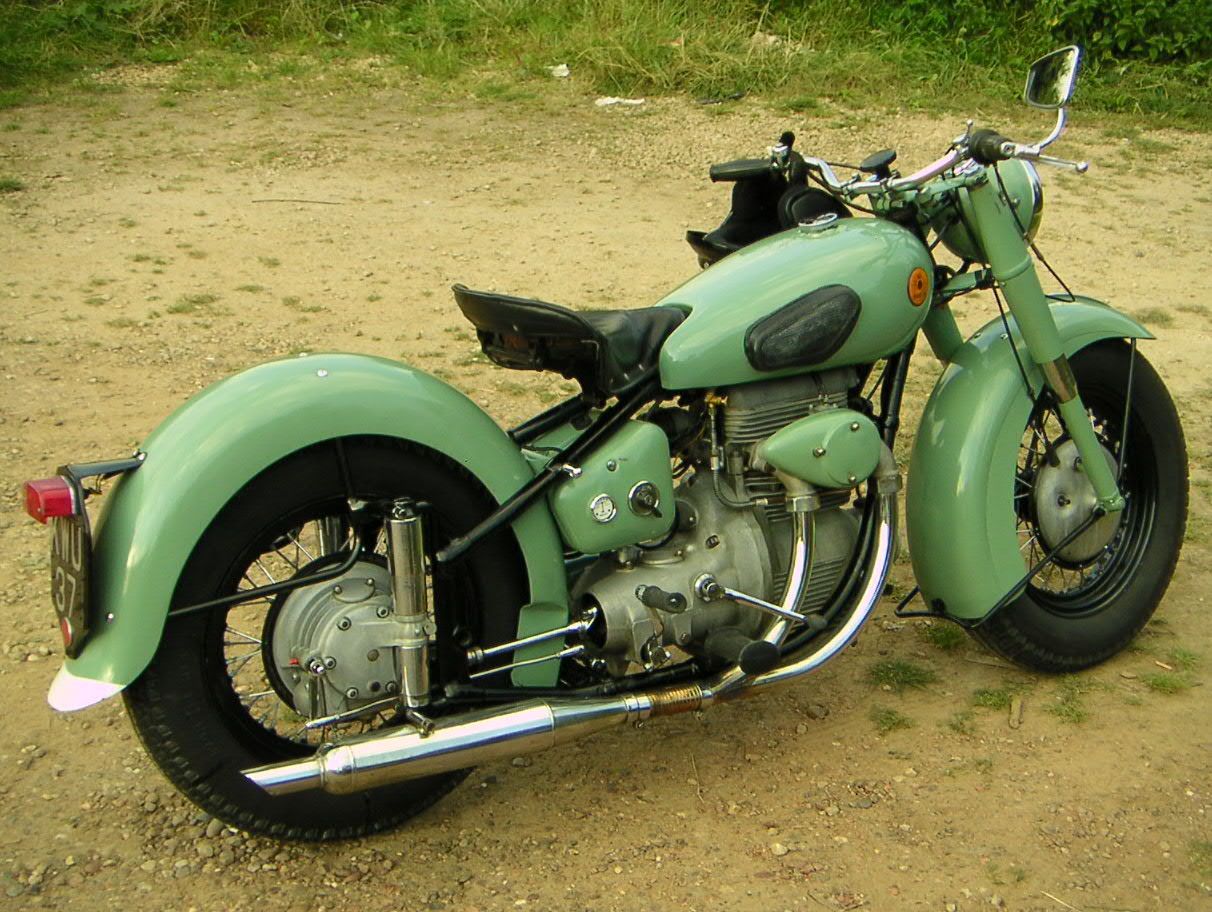
A restored Sunbeam S7, a model available in Britain in green (pictured) or black

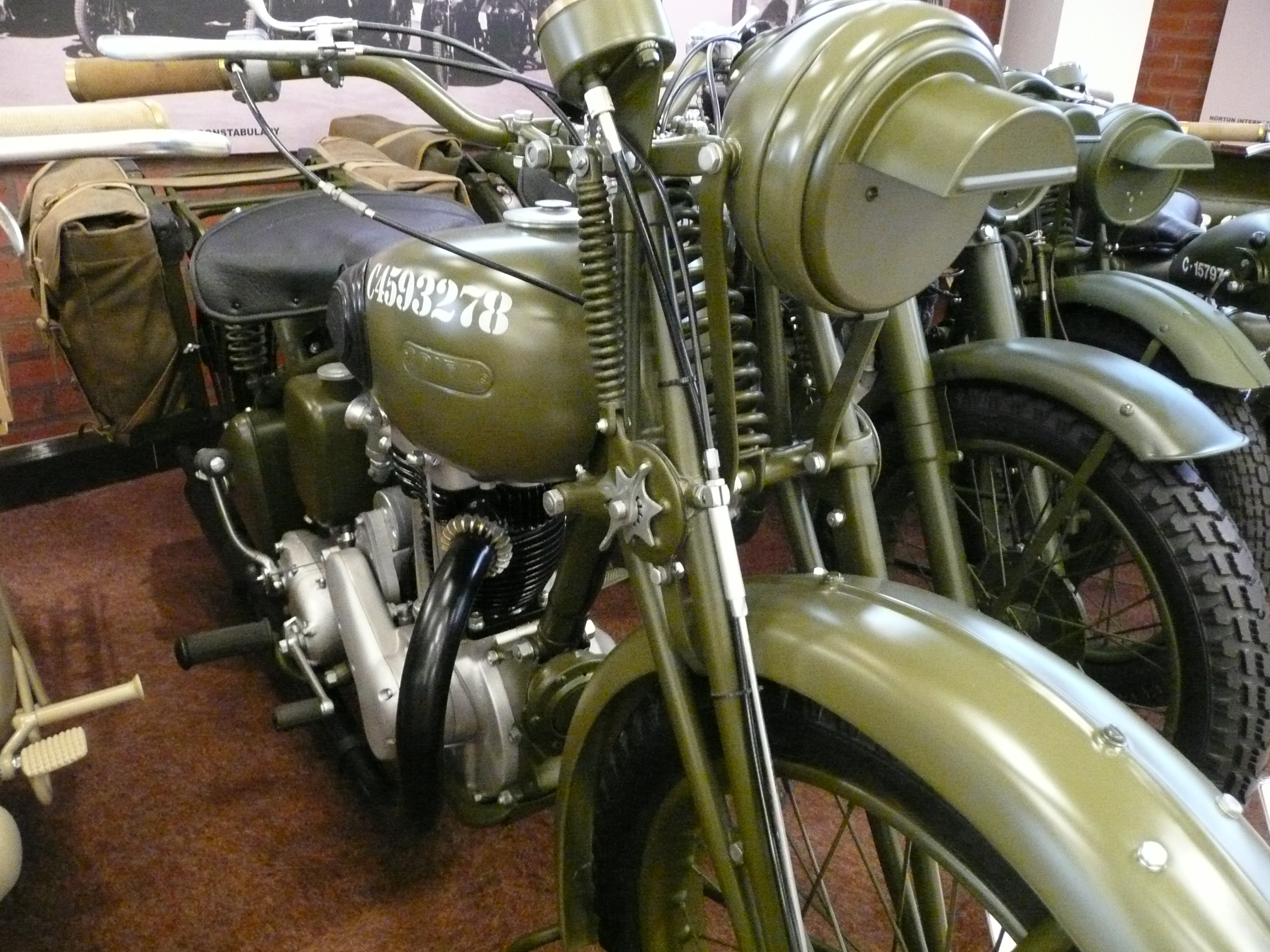
Ariel W/NG 350, which was a model produced for the British armed forces as opposed to commercial civilian use

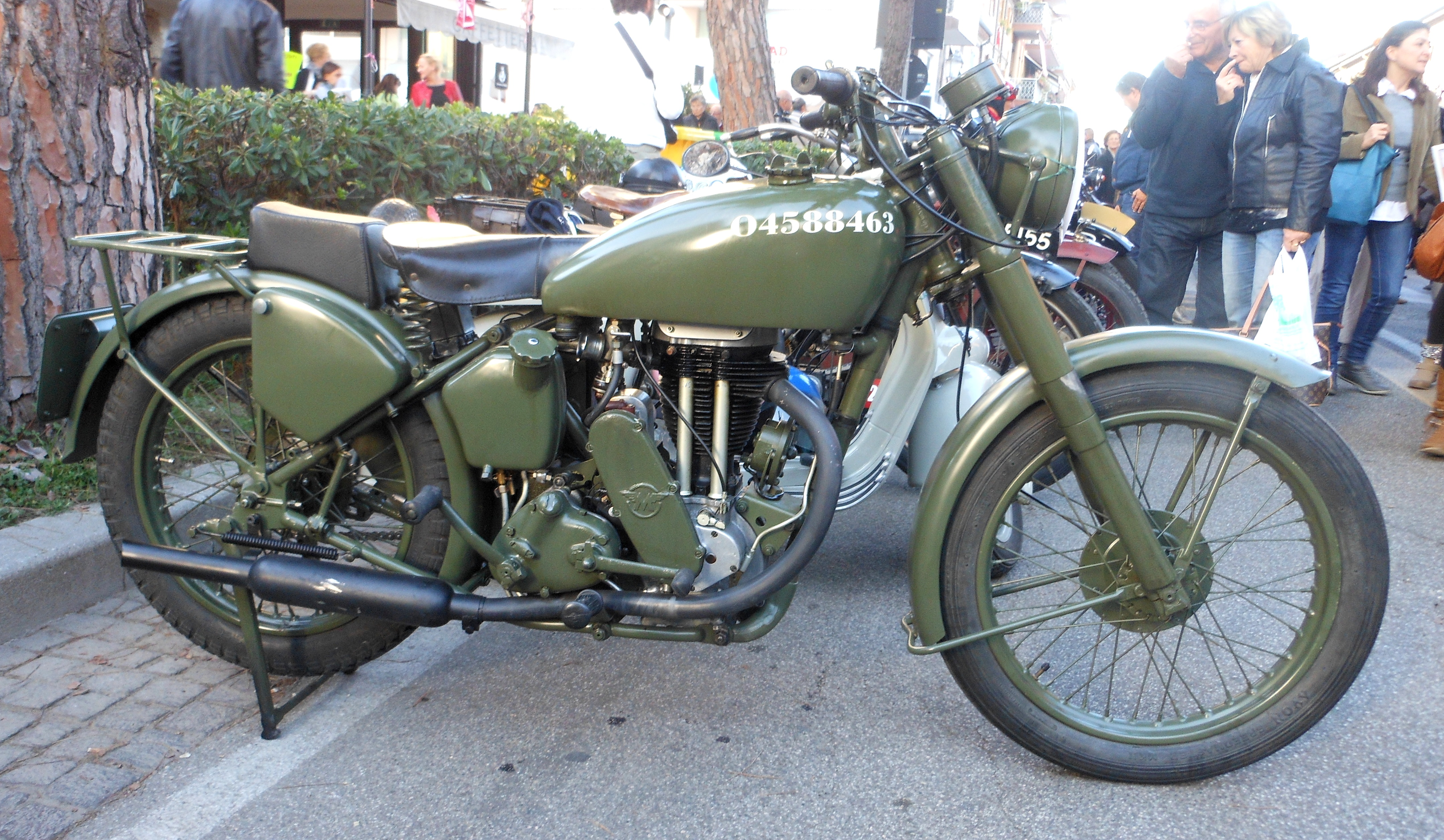
Here is another military model, in this case a Matchless G3/L

== See also ==
- Cyclecars
- Ford Model T
- List of motorcycle manufacturers
- List of motorcycles by type of engine
- List of motorcycles of the 1910s
- List of motorcycles of the 1920s
- List of motorcycles of the 1930s
- List of motorcycles of the 1950s
- List of motorized trikes
- Safety bicycle
