= James Commodore =

1950s two-stroke motorcycle

The James Commodore J4 was a 98 cubic centimetre, two-stroke, motorcycle manufactured by the James Cycle Co and announced in November 1950. The Commodore was in production from 1951 to 1953.

- Engine: Villiers Engineering 1F single-cylinder engine at 98cc 47 mm x 57 mm engine. Carburetor was a Villiers Type 6/0.
- Transmission: Two speed with clutch. Handlebar gear lever.
- Frame: Single downtube frame.
- Suspension: Front was taper tube for girder type with single, central undampened spring. Rear: None
- Brakes: 4" front and rear
- Drive: Chain and sprocket
- Wheels: 21 inches x 2.25 inches

== See also ==
- List of motorcycles of the 1950s
