= Ducati 60 =

Ducati 60, 60 Sport, and 65 Sport
- Manufacturer: Ducati Meccanica S.p.A.
- Production: 1949-1953
- Predecessor: Ducati Cucciolo
- Successor: 65T, 65TL, 65TS
- Class: Standard
- Engine: 59.57 cc (3.635 cu in) air-cooled 4-stroke single
- Bore / stroke: 42 mm × 43 mm (1.7 in × 1.7 in)
- Compression ratio: 8:1
- Top speed: 40 mph (64 km/h) (60); 46 mph (74 km/h) (65 Sport)
- Power: 2.25 hp (1.68 kW) @ 5,000 rpm
- Transmission: 3 speed
- Suspension: Front telescopic fork, rear cantilever
- Brakes: Front and rear drum
- Tires: Front and rear 2.00 in. X 18 in.
- Weight: 44.5 kg (98 lb) (dry)

The Ducati 60 of 1949-50 was Ducati's first in a 19 model year run of four-stroke, OHV single cylinder motorcycles that ended with the 125 Cadet/4 of 1967. The 60 used the 60 cc pullrod engine of the Cucciolo T3 moped, and a frame supplied by Caproni. The 60 Sport (actually 65 cc) of 1950-52 used Ducati's own frame, making it their first complete motorcycle. For 1953 the name was changed to 65 Sport. They were followed by the 65T, 65TL, 65TS series.

== See also ==
- List of motorcycles of the 1940s
