= Rokon (motorcycle manufacturer) =

Motorcycle manufacturer

Rokon Motorcycles
- Company type: Private
- Industry: Motorcycle
- Founded: 1958
- Headquarters: Rochester, New Hampshire, US
- Key people: Orla Larsen; Charlie Fehn
- Products: Motorcycles
- Number of employees: 2
- Website: www.rokon.com

Rokon is an American Rochester, New Hampshire-based motorcycle manufacturer that builds two-wheel-drive off-road motorcycles which are marketed either under the company's name, or as the "Trail Breaker". Robert Korpi was also owner of Rokon International from about 1976 to 1990

== History ==
Rokon was founded in Vermont by Orla Larsen in 1963 to sell the Nethercutt Trail-Breaker, a two-wheel-drive motorcycle invented around 1958 by Charlie Fehn and built in Sylmar, California. In 1964, Rokon Inc. bought the manufacturing rights to the Trail-Breaker and marketed the bikes from their Vermont office before moving the business to New Hampshire, where they continue in business today.

== Design ==
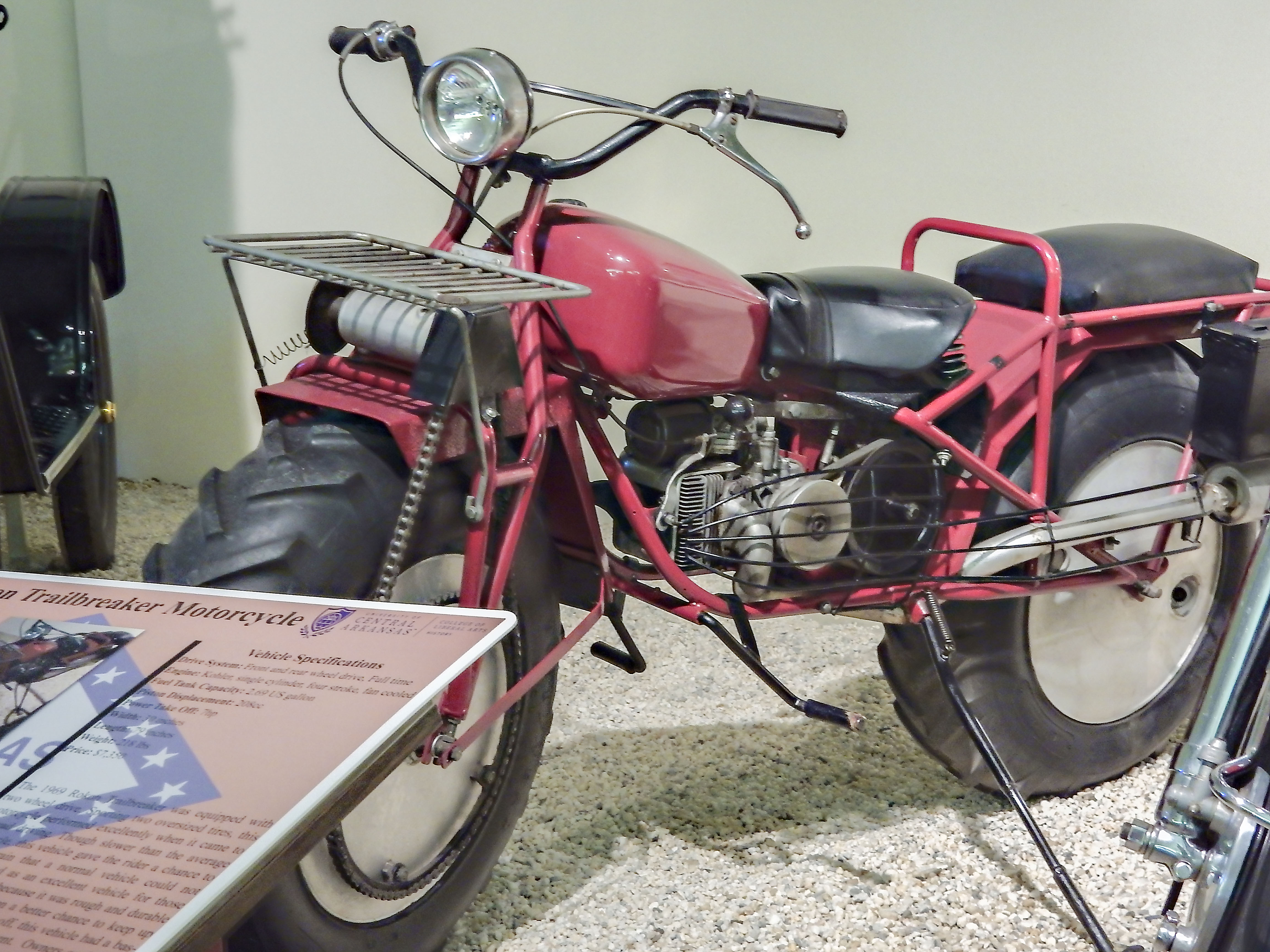
1969 Rokon Trailbreaker two-wheel drive off-road motorcycle from The Museum of Automobiles in Arkansas.

Rokon motorcycles use a combination of belt, chain and shaft drives coupled to gear boxes to drive both the front and rear wheels. Older machines were powered by a West Bend (US Motor/Chrysler Marine) 820 two-stroke engine (134cc), while newer machines have either a Honda or Kohler engine of about 6 hp. Each hollow wheel is able to hold 2.5 gallons of gasoline or water for long-distance trips.

These are slow-speed off-road motorcycles designed for use in the most rugged terrain. Some are capable of 35 mph or more, but typical top speed is about 20 mph. Current models are the Trail-Breaker, Ranger and Scout. When ascending very steep hills speed may be 0.5 mph.

== RT340 TCR Automatic/CVT ==
In 1974, Rokon produced the RT340 TCR Automatic motorcycle, using a snowmobile-type Salsbury CVT, rear wheel drive only, and dual disc brakes. Another unusual feature was a pull cord to start the engine. The transmission freewheels with the engine at idle; starts to engage about 2800 RPM; and is tuned so the engine always runs near peak power, at 6,000 to 6,700 RPM. The lowest gear ratio is 3.76:1 and highest 0.87:1. Using a CVT allows a use of a 2-stroke cycle motor with higher power but narrow power band. The engine sound is unusual as the engine stays at a nearly fixed speed and the transmission ratio changes according to speed. The transmission freewheels when not driving forward, so there is no engine braking. The transmission is vented to the outside for cooling, and so is contaminated by stream crossings and other environmental exposure. Water causes slipping but quickly goes away; however grit can cause transmission sticking.

Riding on loose surfaces is sometimes complicated, as rear wheel breakaway does not cause telltale changes in the engine sound. However, most other riding is intuitive and sometimes much more convenient as the automatic avoids engine stalls and other problems with gear selection. Operation is loud (90.3 dB(A)) as the engine is always running fast except at idle. Despite low front wheel weight, about 43%, it had trouble pulling wheelies, a problem for Enduro riding.

Prototypes were raced by factory riders from 1971 to 1973 under Tom Clark; "TCR" stands for "Tom Clark Replica". In the 48th annual International Six Days Enduro, The 4 riders earned 3 bronze medals and 1 silver medal. "Cycle Guide" test riders reported it superior for hill climbing and fast on hard surfaces, but poor on loose surfaces and descending hills.

== See also ==
- Tote Gote
- Mountain Goat (motor cycle)
