= Rokon, South Sudan =

Rokon
- Location in South Sudan
- Coordinates: 5.132°N 30.942°E
- Country: South Sudan
- State: Central Equatoria
- County: Juba County
- Time zone: UTC+2 (CAT)
- Climate: Aw

Rokon is a city in the Juba County, Central Equatoria of South Sudan, part of the region of Equatoria. The priest and scholar Ezra Baya Lawiri was buried there following his death in 1991.
