= Tote Gote =

Off-road motorcycle

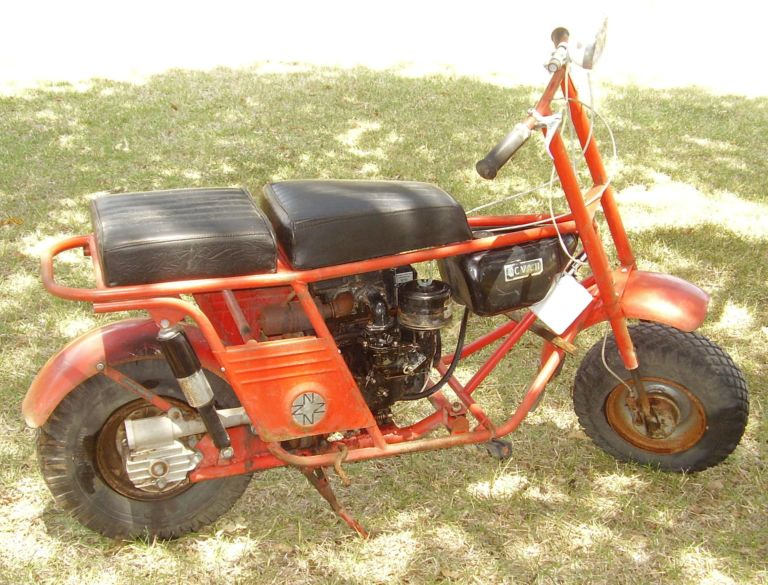
A Tote Gote Model 780 with worm gear drive shaft

The Tote Gote is an off-road motorcycle that was produced from 1958 to 1970. It was developed by Ralph Bonham.

== History ==
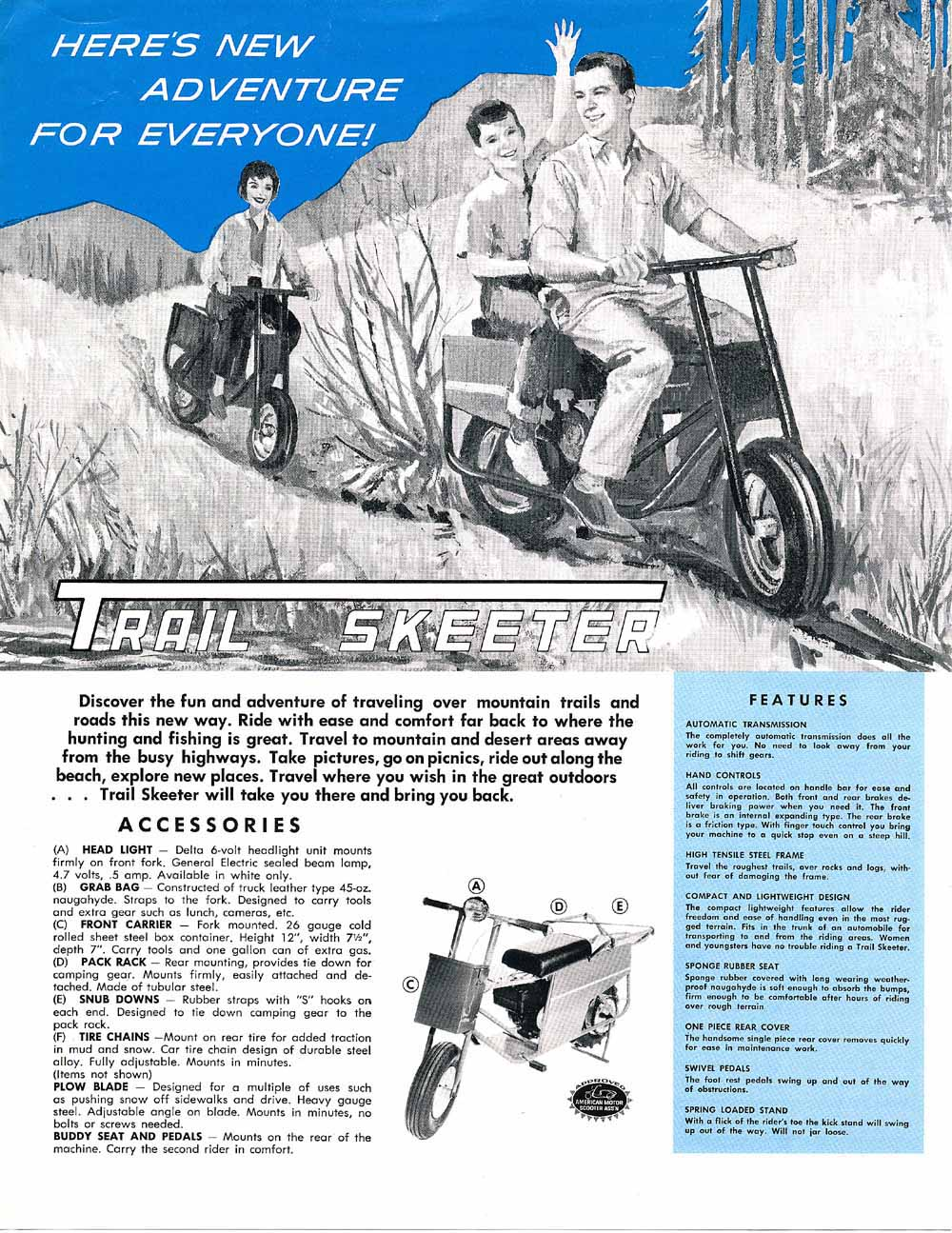
The advertisement for the "Trail Skeeter"

Bonham created the Tote Gote to relieve the exhaustion of walking through the Utah mountains while hunting. First called the "Mechanical Goat", it was renamed to refer to its ability to "tote" (carry) deer out of the woods while climbing inclines with the skill of a mountain goat.

The first Tote Gotes could reach speeds of only 5 mph (8 km/h), too slow for functional use, and the front wheel rose off the ground when too much throttle was applied. The design was eventually perfected in November 1957. The first Tote Gote was sold on 1 June 1958. After entering mass production, 3,700 Tote Gotes were sold in 1960. The second version of the Tote Gote entered the market in 1959, called the Model A or the "Scamp".

Ralph Bonham's father, Bond Bonham, became president of the Bonham Corporation while Ralph focused on research and development. Improvements were introduced, such as rear and side screens to protect the wild game and drivers, and lighting systems. New variants were also created, such as the Loadstar III, a three-wheeled Tote Gote for use in warehouses and plant nurseries; a street-based model called the Collegiate for use on college campuses; a minibike called the Mini Gote; and a shaft driven series called the NOVA.

After producing Tote Gotes for thirteen years, the Bonham Company closed in 1970 and sold its remaining stock of parts. A community of Tote Gote enthusiasts is still active.

== Manufacture ==
Tote Gotes were painted with a low pressure flow of paint. The frames were placed over a large tub of paint with hoses on either side. The paint was pumped through the hoses while workers directed the flow of paint over the frame. Excess paint ran off the bottom and back into the tub. The frames were rotated while drying to minimize runs. Most were red, fewer yellow, and some green (mostly for the Forest Service). Novas were aquamarine. The paint used was lead-based Sherwin-Williams.

== Models ==
- B: Chain drive. The original model, also called the model A, the "Scamp," and the "Trail Skeeter". The Trail Skeeter included louvered sheet metal sides instead of side screens and a 3 horsepower (2.2 kW) Briggs & Stratton engine. The first models used the "Duster" clutch and continuously variable transmission made by Deepco, originally for snowmobiles. Later models used a similar clutch, by Salisbury.
- P: Chain-drive. As for the later Model B, except with a larger frame, a 5 horsepower (3.7 kW) engine, and an arch design above the clutch mount.

The first digit in each model number is typically the horsepower of that particular model; for example, Model 600 has six (6) horsepower.

- 303 "Collegiate": Street- and trail-based college campus bike. This model had rear taillights as a stock option and optional front headlight. It used a 3 horsepower (2.2 kW) Briggs and Stratton engine and Bonham now produced their own "Climb-Away" clutch and transmission, with a broader range of ratios.
- 403: Chain drive
- 404: Chain drive
- 430: Chain drive
- 430-5: Chain drive
- 431: Chain drive
- 431-5: Chain drive
- 500 "Mini Gote": Competitor to the minibike movement of the 1960s. This model was designed with children in mind, with chain drive, front and rear suspension. The early models used a 5 horsepower (3.7 kW) Briggs & Stratton engine and the later ones utilized a 7 horsepower (5.2 kW) Tecumseh engine.
- 501 Charger 3-wheeler: Light duty tricycle, for recreation or light commercial use.
- 502 Charger 3-wheeler: The "big brother" to the 501/504; the second-most-powerful model with a low gear ratio and ability to pull 1,000 lb (450 kg) of cargo.
- 503 Charger 3-wheeler: A six-horsepower tricycle, this model featured the "Climb-Away" automatic transmission, split rim wheels and roller bearings, a larger bed and a swing-down tailgate.
- 504 Charger 3-wheeler: A four-horsepower tricycle designed as a people mover.
- 505 Charger 3-wheeler: Same as Model 501, but with load capacity increased to 350 lb (160 kg).
- 531: Chain drive, full suspension. Climb-Away transmission.
- 530: Chain drive. Similar to 531, except with lower gearing.
- 600: Chain drive, 6 horsepower (4.5 kW) Briggs & Stratton engine, double-jackshaft, Climb-Away transmission, lighting system.
- 610: Chain drive. Similar to 600, except with a 12-inch (300 mm) rear wheel.
- 665: Chain drive. Similar to 600, except with full suspension.
- 666: Chain drive. Included 12-inch (300 mm) rear wheel and full suspension with lower gearing.
- 670 Nova: Bonham worm gear drive. The fastest model, with a top speed of 36 mph (58 km/h). Lighting system. Several deluxe variants with white-wall tires and red seats and grips were also made.
- 671: Similar to 670, except with lower gear ratio and slower speed and possibly, after 1968, a rear grab bar.
- 675: Same frame and engine as 670, however, gearing was lower. Was released in 1962.
- 680 Nova: Bonham worm gear drive, deluxe model made with large frame, full suspension, 12" rear tractor tire, front brake, tear drop gas tank, rear grab bar, Sold in 1964 for $794
- 660 Spartan snowmobile/dune buggy: this was Bonham's version of the snowmobile. It utilized a rear track and front skis. The front skis could be replaced with 8-inch (200 mm) Tote Gote wheels for spring and summer use. They were intended for recreation and patrolling areas inaccessible to road vehicles.
- 700: Chain drive. Only model using flat-cast metal on the swing arm and its mount. Included steel tubing on front of the frame and a mounted teardrop gas tank. 7 horsepower (5.2 kW) Tecumseh. One large seat instead of two separate seats. Similar to Model 500.
- 706: Chain-drive. Briggs & Stratton engine. Climb-Away transmission. Commercial grade 8" aircraft-type tires, resulting in increased stability.
- 750: Chain-drive. Briggs & Stratton engine. Climb-Away transmission. Full suspension, 12-inch (300 mm) tractor tire on rear wheel. A 5.70-8 front tire was offered as an option.
- 760: Chain-drive. Similar to 750 except with 8" rear wheel.
- 770: Chain-drive. Briggs & Stratton engine. Climb-Away transmission, 12" rear wheel, one-piece foam seat; only model that did not have a back fender.
- 780 "Nova": Same as Model 675, but with a slightly different frame. Full suspension; grab-bar in back; frame slightly chopped to utilize swing arm. Aircraft-type rear disc brake. This model was supplied to the United States Forest Service, painted in forest service green.
- 781: Similar to 780 except with taller gearing.
- Dune Gote: A tricycle designed for family fun, some variants used the same shock absorbers in the front as those used in the rear of the Model 500. It was known to have been produced in soft tail and hard tail versions.
- Trail Skeeter, also made by Bonham Tote Gote: It was the model B frame but with sheet metal side covers and more options. This was the Later Deluxe Model B, released in 1959.

Bonham made several one-off and rare prototypes, such as four-wheeled vehicles for military use and several prototype Tote Gote Trail Bikes. (The most recent Trail Bike was auctioned on eBay in November 2005.)

The Provo, Utah factory

=== Trailers ===
- 101 (trailer): Lightweight, two-wheel trailer with sheet metal sides that could carry four Tote Gotes.
- 102 (trailer): Medium duty, three-wheel trailer (two wheels in back, one in front) with sheet metal sides that could carry four Tote Gotes, with a fold-away storage bed.
- 103 (trailer): Heavy duty (500-lb rated) trailer with sheet metal sides that could carry four Tote Gotes, or two Chargers

== Advertising ==
Among some of the photo advertisements there were images of Ralph Bonham on a Tote Gote shooting a rifle, a man jumping a Model B over a small sand dune, two Collegiate Tote Gotes parked on a lawn with people having a picnic in the background, and several other photos of people having picnics.

Advertising illustrations included a family on Trail Skeeters, and a man riding a Tote Gote Spartan snowmobile to a mountain cabin.

== Accessories ==
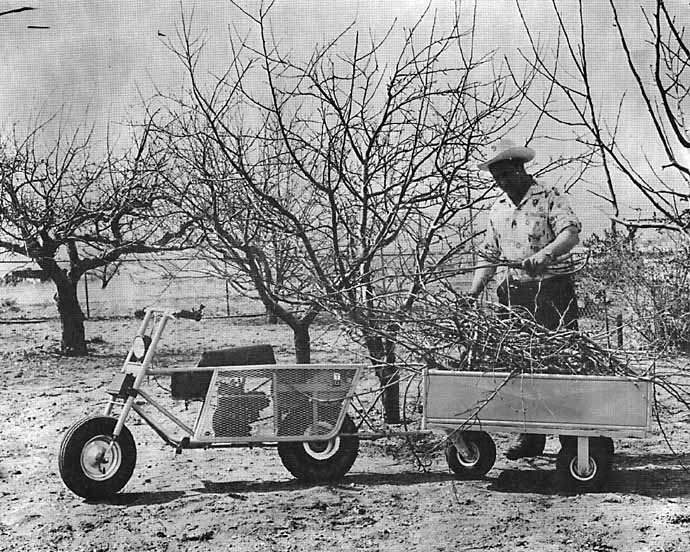
A typical Model 600 Tote Gote with a flatbed trailer and lighting system

- Metal box in front for fuel can or other items
- Front "Grab Bag" saddle bag
- Six-volt Delta headlight, or sealed-beam General Electric headlight
- Rear "Pak Rack" folding cargo rack
- Snub Downs, later called Snubber Rubbers, or Rubber Snubbers
- Front and rear tire chains for snow
- Snow plow blade
- Front buddy seat or a rear buddy seat with rear foot pegs
- Taillights (standard on the Collegiate)
- Rubber foot pegs
- Sidecar
- Front brakes (for models on which this was not standard)

== See also ==
- Rokon motorcycle
- Go kart
