= James Cycle Co =

British bicycle and motorcycle manufacturer

James Cycle Co.
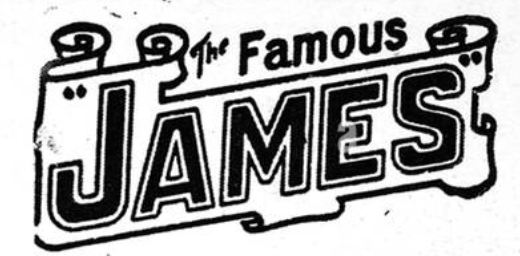
- Founded: 1884
- Founder: Harold James
- Defunct: 1966
- Successor: Associated Motor Cycles
- Headquarters: Birmingham

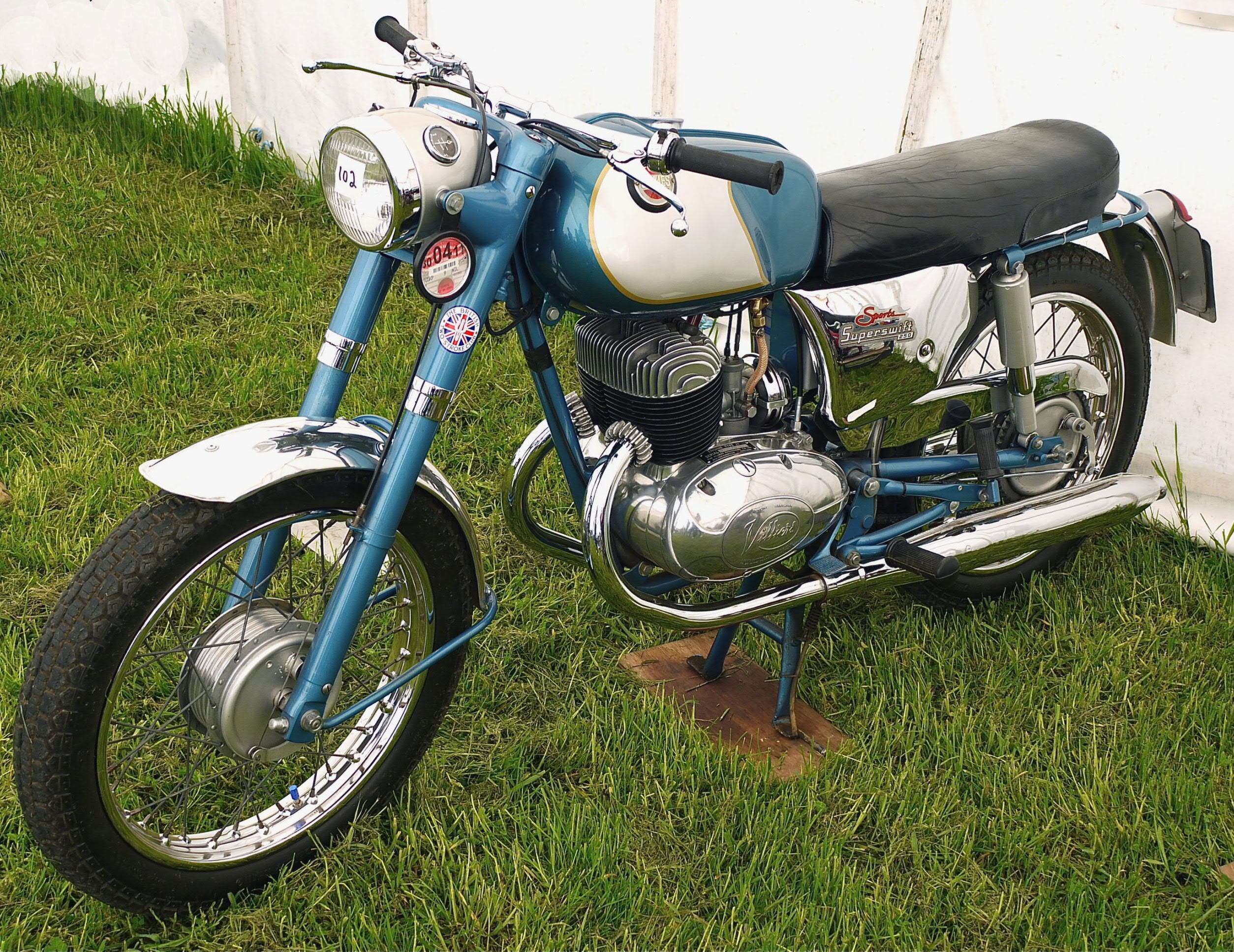
James Superswift with Villiers 247 cc twin-cylinder engine

The James Cycle Co Ltd., Greet, Birmingham, England, was one of many British cycle and motorcycle makers based in the English Midlands, particularly Birmingham. Most of their light motorcycles, often with the characteristic maroon finish, used Villiers and, later, AMC two-stroke engines.

James were prolific bicycle and motorcycle manufacturers from 1884 to 1966. The company was taken over by Associated Motor Cycles in 1951 and combined with Francis-Barnett in 1957. In 1966 the company became one of the many British motorcycle companies forced out of business by Japanese competition.

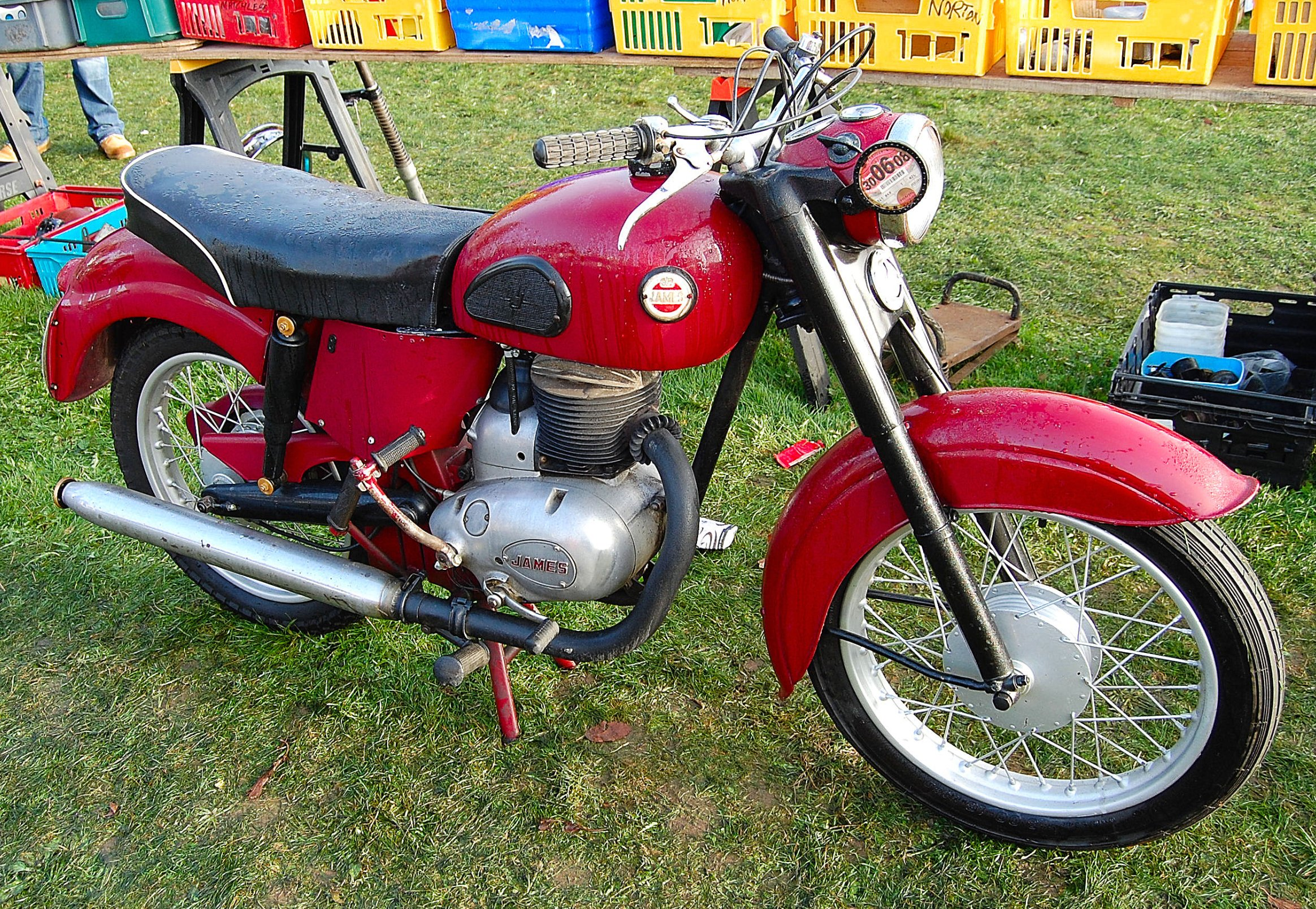
James Captain 197 cc

== History ==
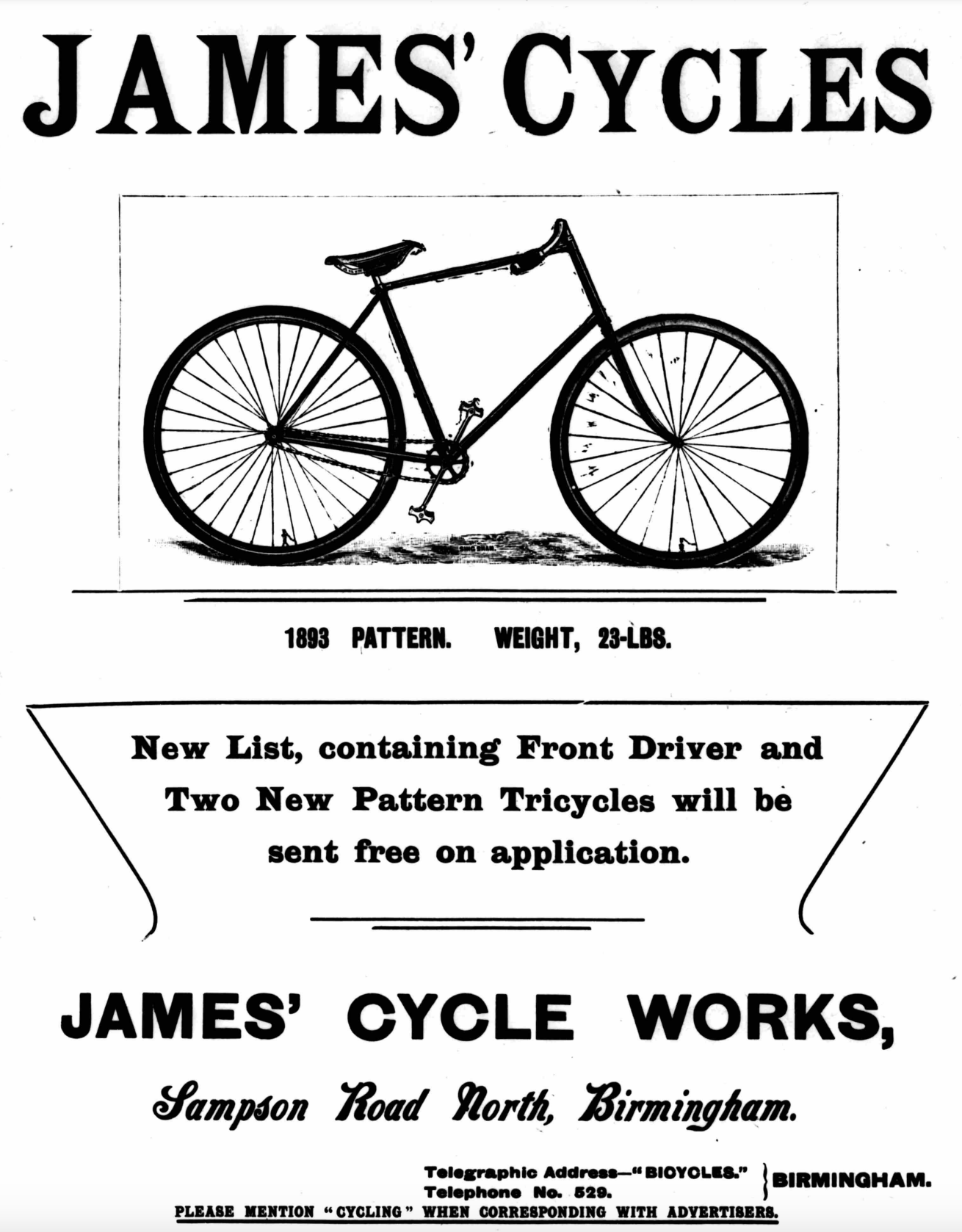
James Cycle Co advertisement 1893

In 1884, Harold "Harry" James founded The James Cycle Company in Birmingham to manufacture bicycles. The first works were at 121 Constitution Hill. In 1890, the company relocated to a new factory at Sampson Road North in Sparkbrook. James Cycle was converted to a public limited company in May 1897. Harry James retired in 1898, and his partner Charles Hyde took over. Hyde introduced a freewheel mechanism that proved very popular.

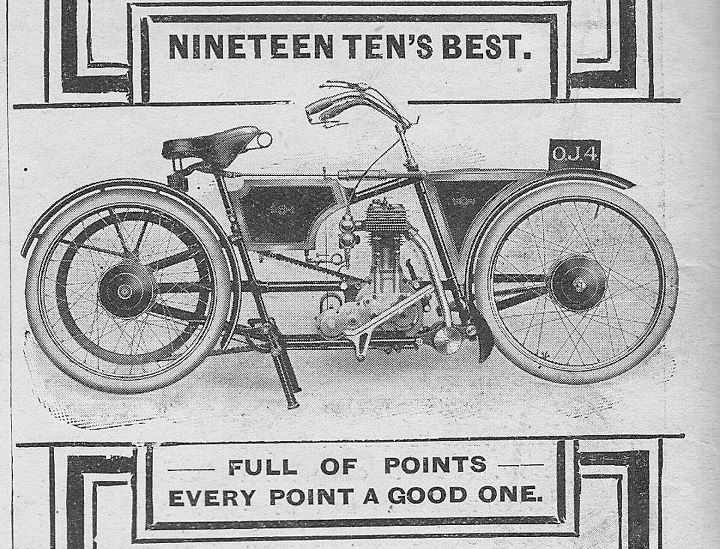
1910 new pattern James motorcycle with hub centre steering

In 1902, the company introduced its first motorcycles under the leadership of Fred Kimberley. The first machine was a moped that had foot pedals and a Werner engine powering the rear wheel through a friction roller. In 1908 the first "James Safety Model" was introduced, which used an engine designed by the James company and the first saddle fuel tank on a motorcycle. In 1910 James produced the James No.2 3½ H.P., notable for its hub steering arrangement.

== Post-second-world-war models ==
James produced the 98 cc Autocycle, 98cc Comet, Commodore, also 1954/55 Colonel 225cc Villiers single cylinder, several Captains as well as trials and scrambles bikes. In 1956 they produced the Captain 200 K7, Cotswold 200 K7C, and Commando 200 K7T, all 197 cc.
