= Ducati 125 TV =

Ducati 125 TV, 125 T
- Manufacturer: Ducati Meccanica S.p.A.
- Production: 1956–1960
- Class: Standard
- Engine: 124.443 cc (7.5940 cu in) air-cooled single cylinder 4-stroke
- Bore / stroke: 55.2 mm × 52 mm (2.17 in × 2.05 in)
- Compression ratio: 7:1
- Top speed: 86 km/h (53 mph)
- Power: 6.5 hp (4.8 kW) @ 6,500 rpm
- Transmission: 4 speed
- Suspension: Front: telescopic fork Rear: swingarm
- Brakes: Drum
- Tires: Front: 2.50 × 17 in. front Rear: 2.75 × 17 in.

The Ducati 125 T (Turismo) and 125 TV (Turismo Veloce) were single cylinder, four-stroke OHV motorcycles built by Ducati from 1956 to 1960, featuring a double downtube full cradle steel frame and full-width drum brakes.

The 125 T sold in London for £181 13 s. 10 d. (inflation adjusted to £ 5361.64 currently) and the 125 TV was £187 2 s. 6 d. (£ 5522.03 currently).

Ducati's success in the year these models were released, selling over 10,000 units in 1956 (a 3.5% market share), would be unmatched until 1992.

== See also ==
- List of motorcycles of the 1950s
