= Ducati 65T =

Ducati 65T, 65TL, 65TS
- Manufacturer: Ducati Meccanica S.p.A.
- Production: 1952-1958
- Predecessor: 65 Sport
- Class: Standard
- Engine: Air-cooled single cylinder 4-stroke, 65.38 cc displacement, 44 mm ∅ x 43 mm, 8:1 compression
- Top speed: 70 km/h (43 mph)
- Power: 2.5 hp @ 5,600 rpm
- Transmission: 3 speed
- Suspension: front telescopic fork, rear swingarm
- Weight: 65T and 65TL 59 kg (130 lb), 65TS 54 kg (119 lb) (dry)

The Ducati 65T, and the 65TL (Turismo Lusso) luxury version, are motorcycles manufactured by Ducati Meccanica S.p.A., from 1952 to 1958, coming out in the same year as the 98. The 65TS (Turismo Sport) appeared in 1955, ten pounds lighter, with a different gas tank, lower handlebars and dual seat.

== See also ==
- List of motorcycles of the 1950s
