= List of motorcycles of the 1950s =

This a listing of motorcycles of the 1950s, including those on sale, introduced, or otherwise relevant in this period.

- AJS 18 (1949–1963)
- AJS Model 31
- Ariel Leader
- BMW R24
- BMW R25
- BMW R25/2
- BMW R25/3
- BMW R51/2
- BMW R51/3
- BMW R67
- BMW R67/2
- BMW R67/3
- BMW R68
- BMW R50
- BMW R60
- BMW R69
- BSA C15
- BSA Golden Flash
- BSA Road Rocket
- BSA Super Rocket
- BSA Sunbeam
- Douglas Dragonfly
- Ducati Aurea
- Ducati 125 T
- Ducati 125 TV
- Ducati 65T
- Ducati 65TL
- Ducati 65TS
- Ducati 98
- Harley-Davidson Hummer
- Harley-Davidson KR
- Harley-Davidson K, KK, KH, KHK
- Harley-Davidson Sportster
- Harley-Davidson Servi-Car (produced 1932–1973)
- Harley Davidson Duo-Glide
- Heinkel Tourist
- Honda Juno
- Honda Super Cub
- Honda C71, C76, C72, C77 Dream
- Honda C92, CB92, C95 Benly
- Indian Chief (till 1953)
- James Commodore
- Maicoletta
- Maico Mobil
- Matchless G12
- Matchless G50
- Moto Guzzi Cardellino
- Moto Guzzi V8
- MV Agusta 125 SOHC
- Norton Dominator
- OEC
- Panther Model 100
- Panther Model 120
- Puch 250 SGS (a.k.a. Sears Twingle)
- Royal Enfield Fury
- Royal Enfield Super Meteor
- Tote Gote
- Triumph Bonneville
- Triumph Bonneville T120
- Triumph Thunderbird ('49-'66 misc. versions)
- Triumph Tigress
- Triumph Tiger T110
- Velocette - (Various Models)
- Vincent Black Knight
- Vincent Black Prince
- Vincent Black Lightning
- Yamaha YA-1
- Zündapp Bella

== Gallery ==
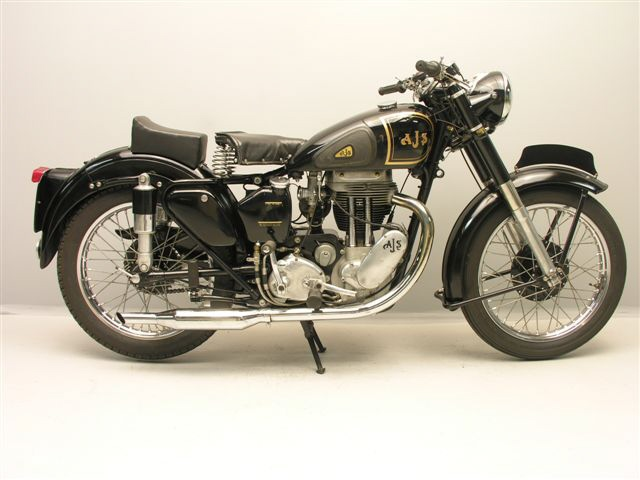
AJS 18S

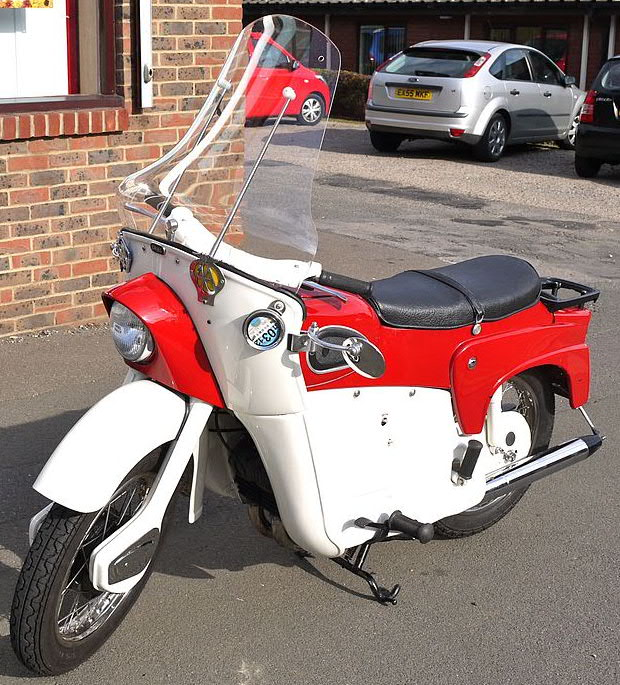
Ariel Leader

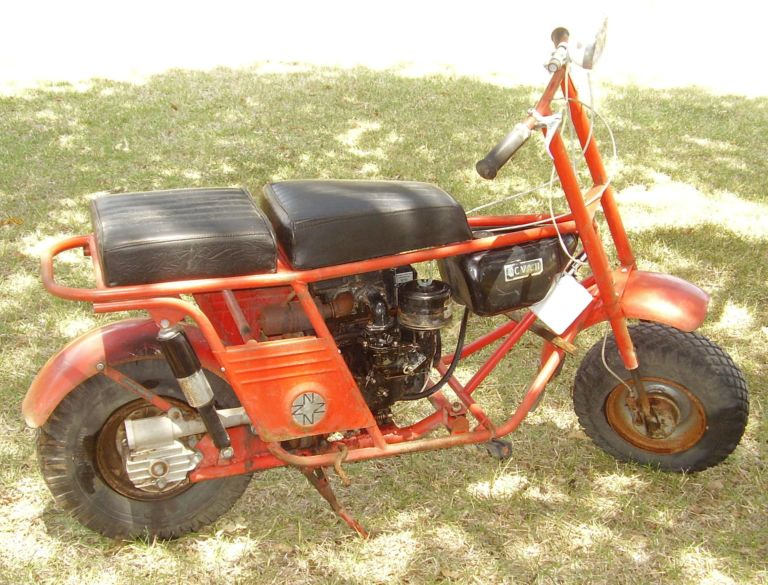
Tote Gote

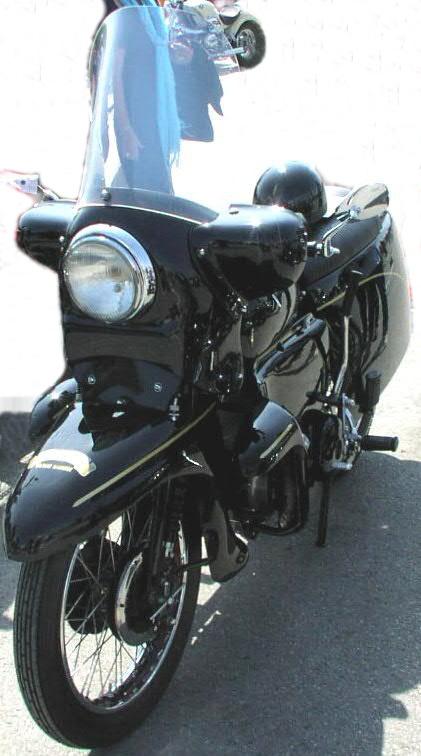
Vincent Black Prince

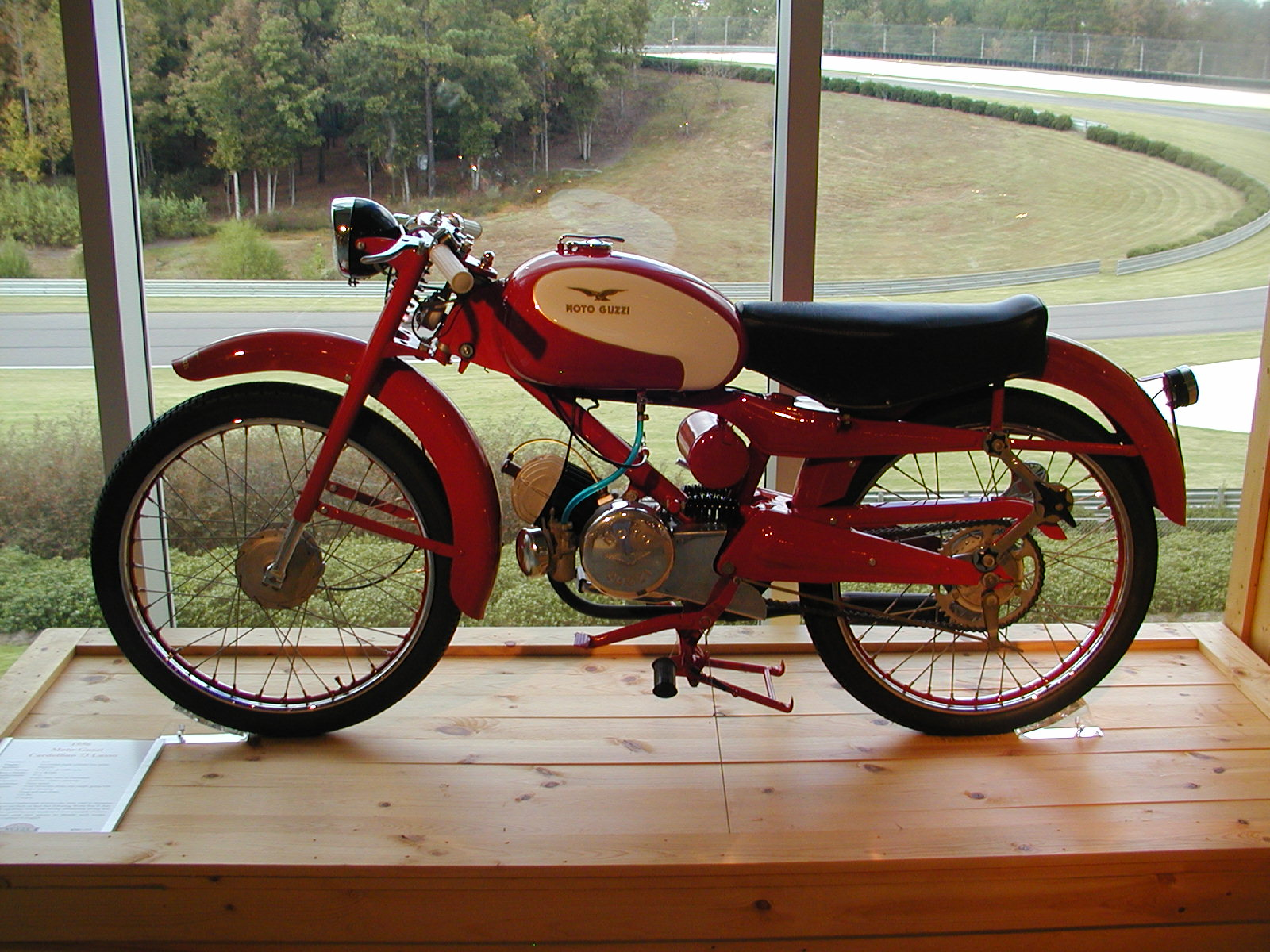
Moto Guzzi Cardellino

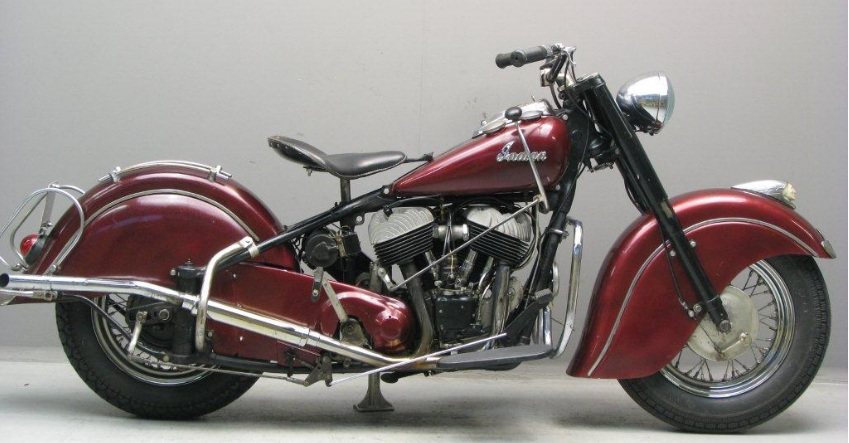
1950 Indian Chief Black Hawk

== See also ==
- List of motorcycles of the 1910s
- List of motorcycles of the 1920s
- List of motorcycles of the 1930s
- List of motorcycles of the 1940s
- List of motorcycle manufacturers
- Cyclecars
- Ford Model T
- Safety bicycle
- List of motorized trikes
- List of motorcycles by type of engine
