= Heinkel Tourist =

German motor scooter (1953–1965)

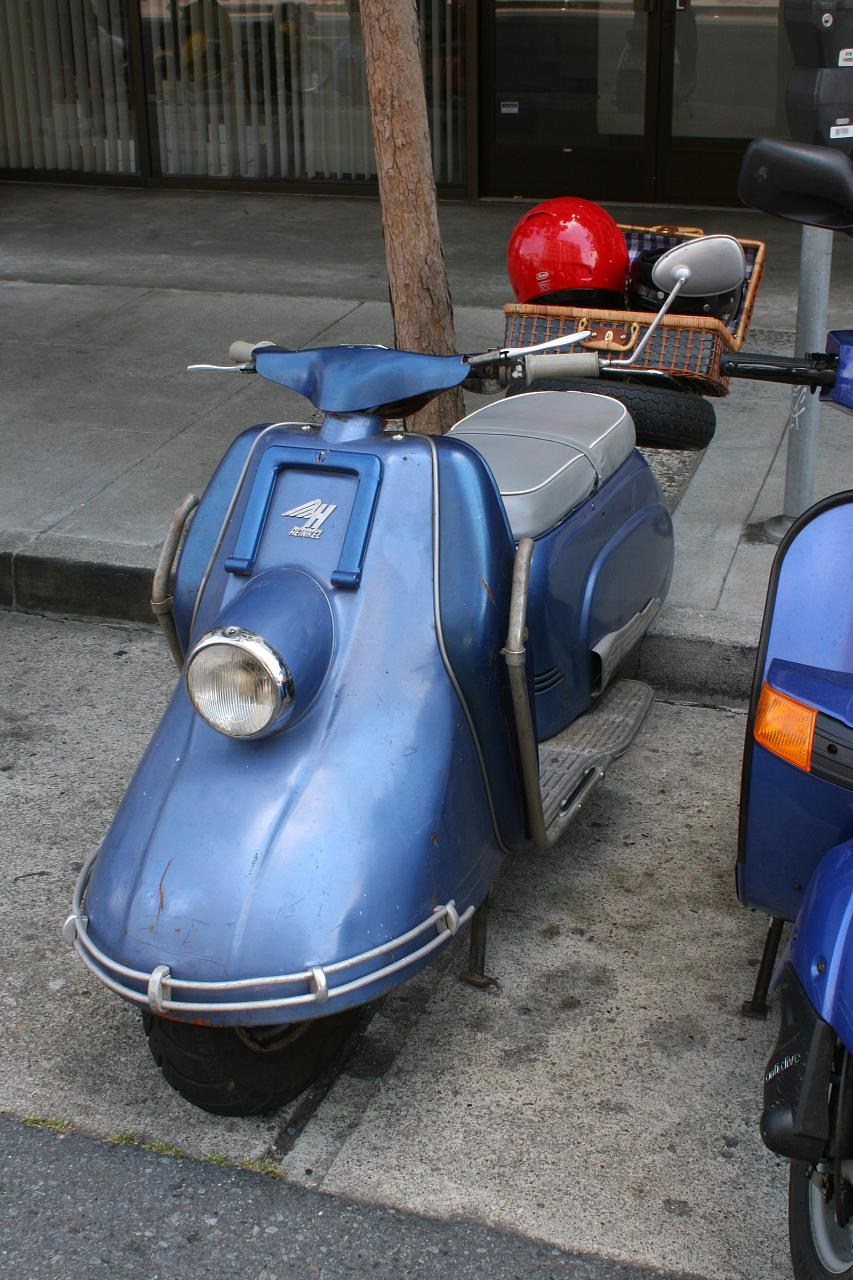
Heinkel Tourist 103 A1

The Heinkel Tourist is a motor scooter that was made by Heinkel Flugzeugwerke from 1953 to 1965. More than 100,000 were manufactured and sold.

The Tourist was sold as an upscale scooter. It was more expensive than a Vespa or a Lambretta, and was generally heavier, more comfortable, and more stable. It was available with a speedometer, a steering lock, a clock, a luggage carrier, and a spare wheel. It was referred to in England as "The Rolls-Royce of Scooters" and was advertised by a dealer in Massachusetts as "The Cadillac of Scooters".

The Tourist had a tubular steel frame to which pressed steel body panels were mounted. The engine of the Tourist was mounted in the frame and drove the rear wheel by a chain enclosed in the swingarm. Thus sheltered, the chain ran in a sealed oil bath, extending its life and preventing any oil from contacting either scooter or rider. The engines used in Heinkel Tourists were 4-stroke while most other scooters of the time, including the Heinkel 150 light scooter from the 1960s, had 2-stroke engines.

== Production ==
Heinkel's first prototype scooter was built in 1949. Production of the Tourist began in 1953.

The Tourist was manufactured in five series: the 101 A0 (1953–1954), the 102 A1 (1954–1955), the 103 A0 (1955–1957), the 103 A1 (1957–1960), and the 103 A2 (1960–1965).

=== 101 A0 ===
The Tourist 101 A0 was the first series of Heinkel Tourist, the only series with a 149 cc (9.1 cu in) engine, and the only series with a kick starter. Production began in April 1953. The three-speed transmission was actuated by a twistgrip on a tubular steel handlebar.

In June 1954, the electrics were uprated from 6 V to 12 V to accommodate the addition of an electric starter at that time. Production of the 101 A0 ended two months later. 6,500 Tourist 101 A0s were built.

=== 102 A1 ===
Production of the 102 A1 series began in July 1954. The main changes from the 101 A0 were the larger engine, which had been bored and stroked to a capacity of 174 cc (10.6 cu in), the absence of a kick starter, and the use of the 12 V electrics and an electric starter as on the last of the 101 A0s. A glove box was included behind the legshield. The speedometer was mounted on the glove box.

17,500 Tourist 102 A1s were built before production ended in August 1955.

=== 103 A0 ===
Production of the 103 A0 series began in August 1955. 103-series Tourists had four speed transmissions and ten inch wheels, enlarged from the three speed transmissions and eight inch wheels of earlier models. The result was a larger, heavier, and thirstier scooter on one hand, and a faster, more sophisticated scooter on the other.

34,060 Tourist 103 A0s were reported built before production ended in September 1957; this production figure is disputed.

1956 Heinkel Tourist 103 A0
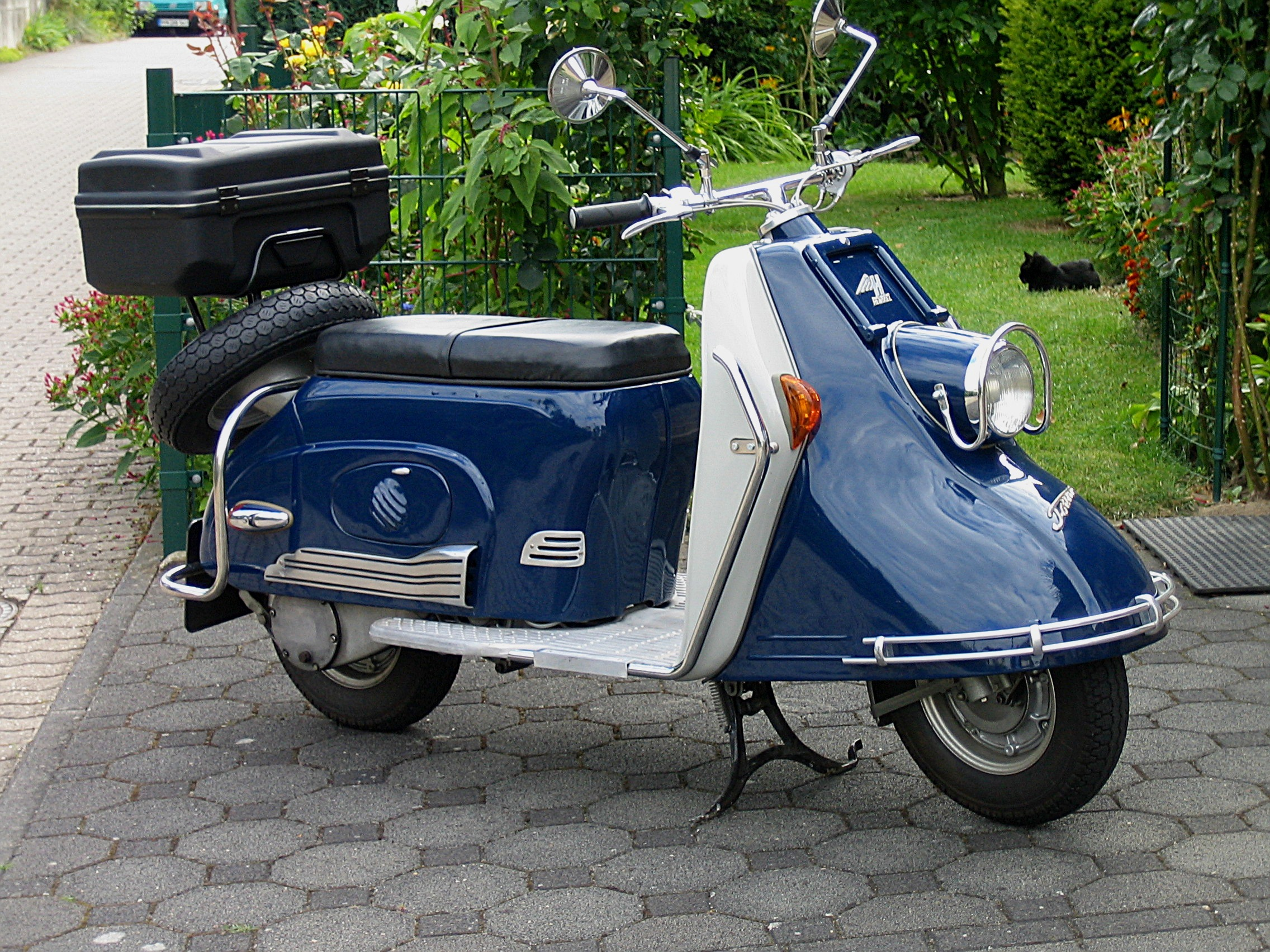
Heinkel Tourist 103 A0

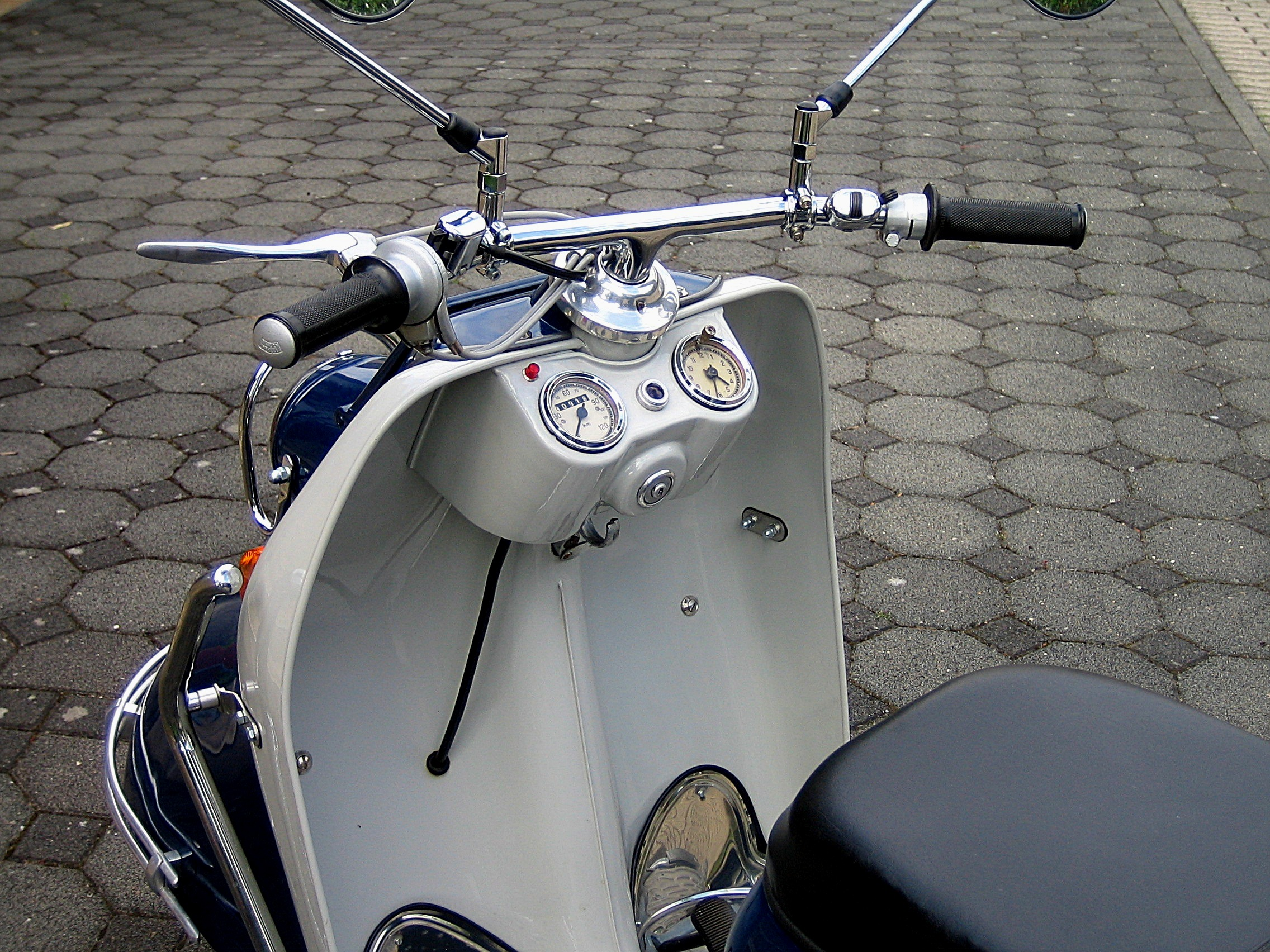
Tubular handlebar and fairing-mounted instrument panel

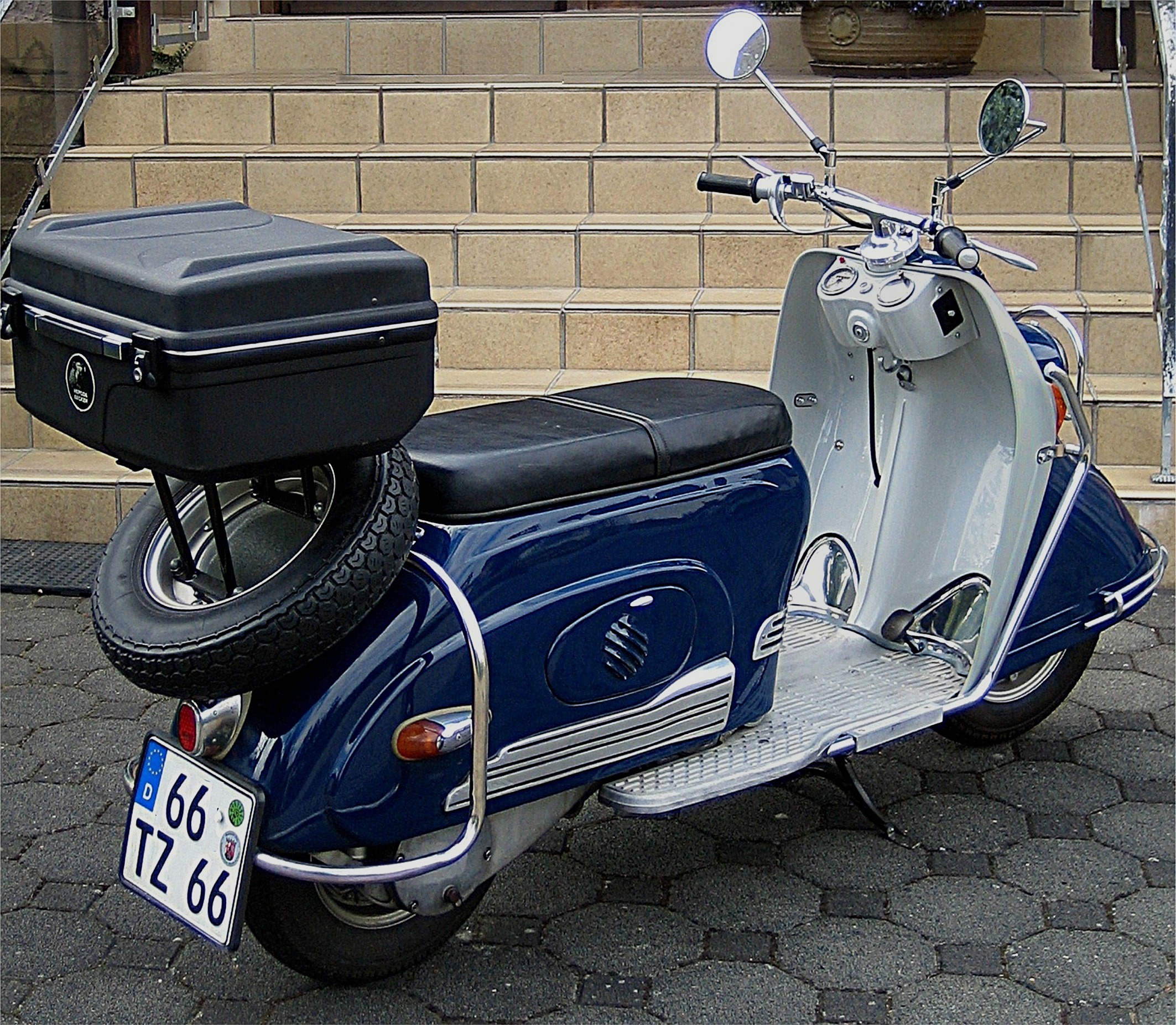
The rear of Heinkel Tourist 103 A0

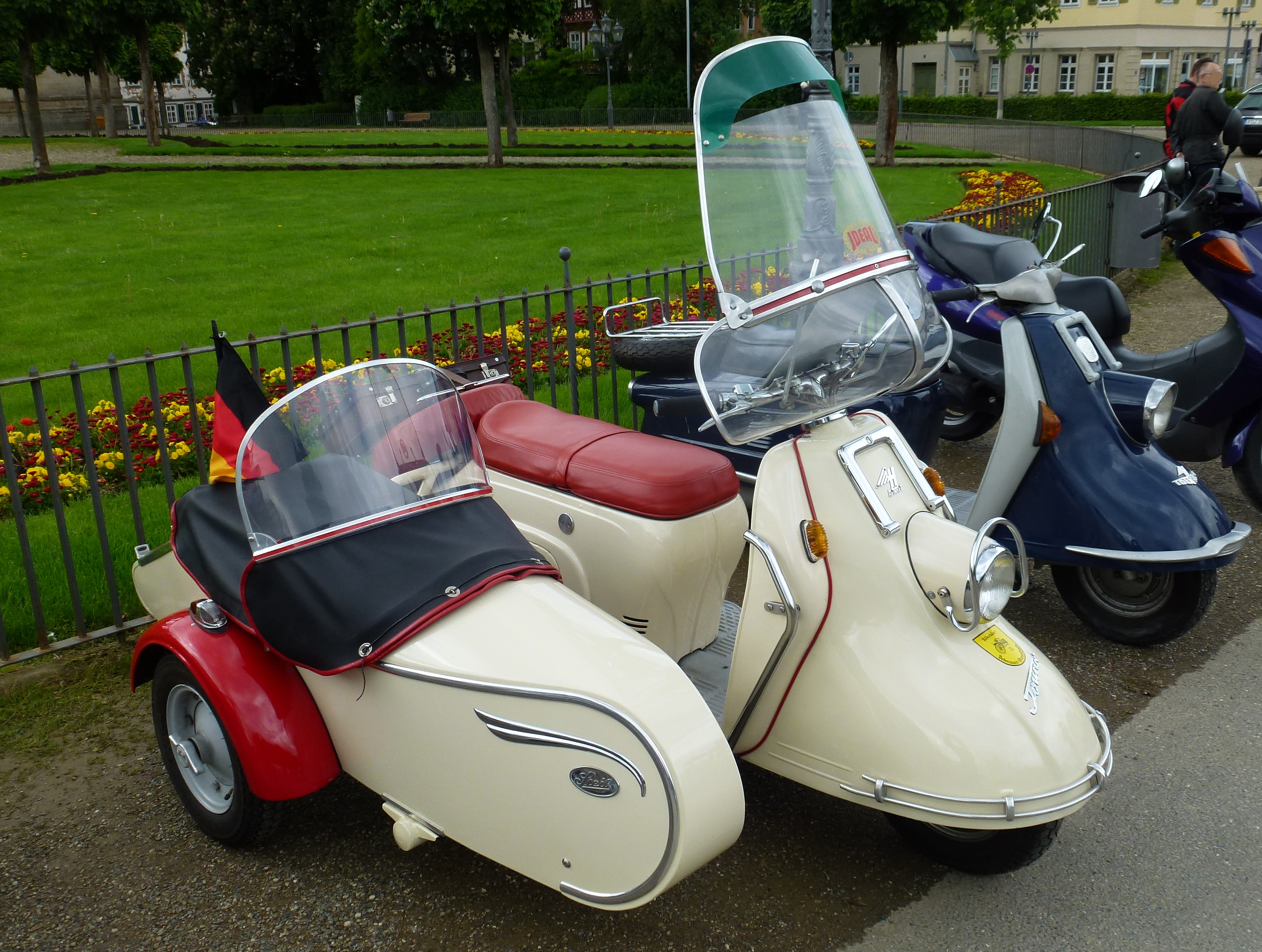
Heinkel Tourist 103 A0 with Steib sidecar

=== 103 A1 ===
Production of the 103 A1 series began in September 1957. The tubular handlebars of previous series were replaced by a cast handlebar containing an instrument panel. The engine, while remaining the same in size, was improved by the use of a two-bearing crankshaft. The engine was now mounted to the frame with rubber mounts, improving the ride.

50,050 Tourist 103 A1s were built before production ended in June 1960.

Heinkel Tourist 103 A1
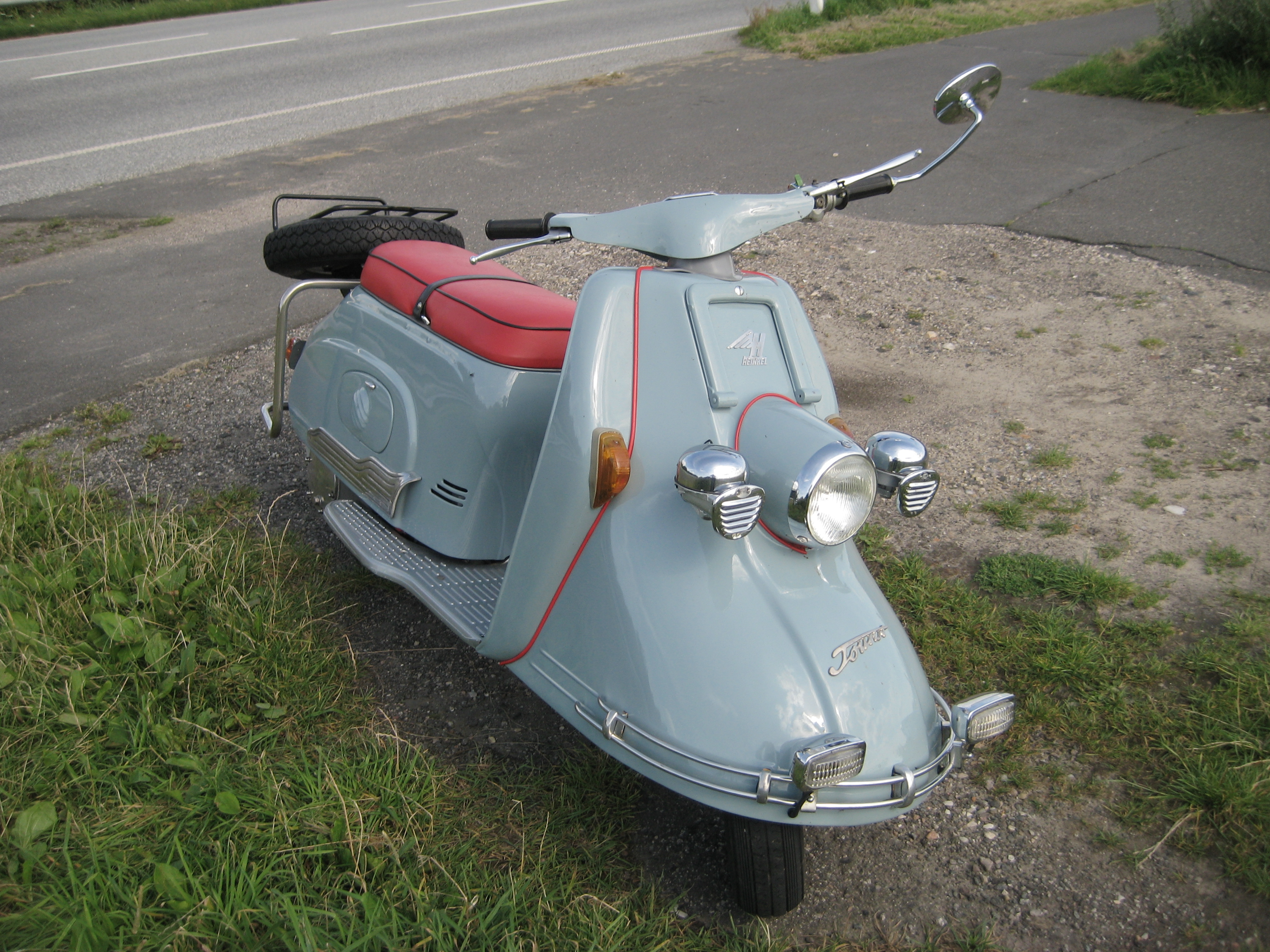
Heinkel Tourist 103 A1

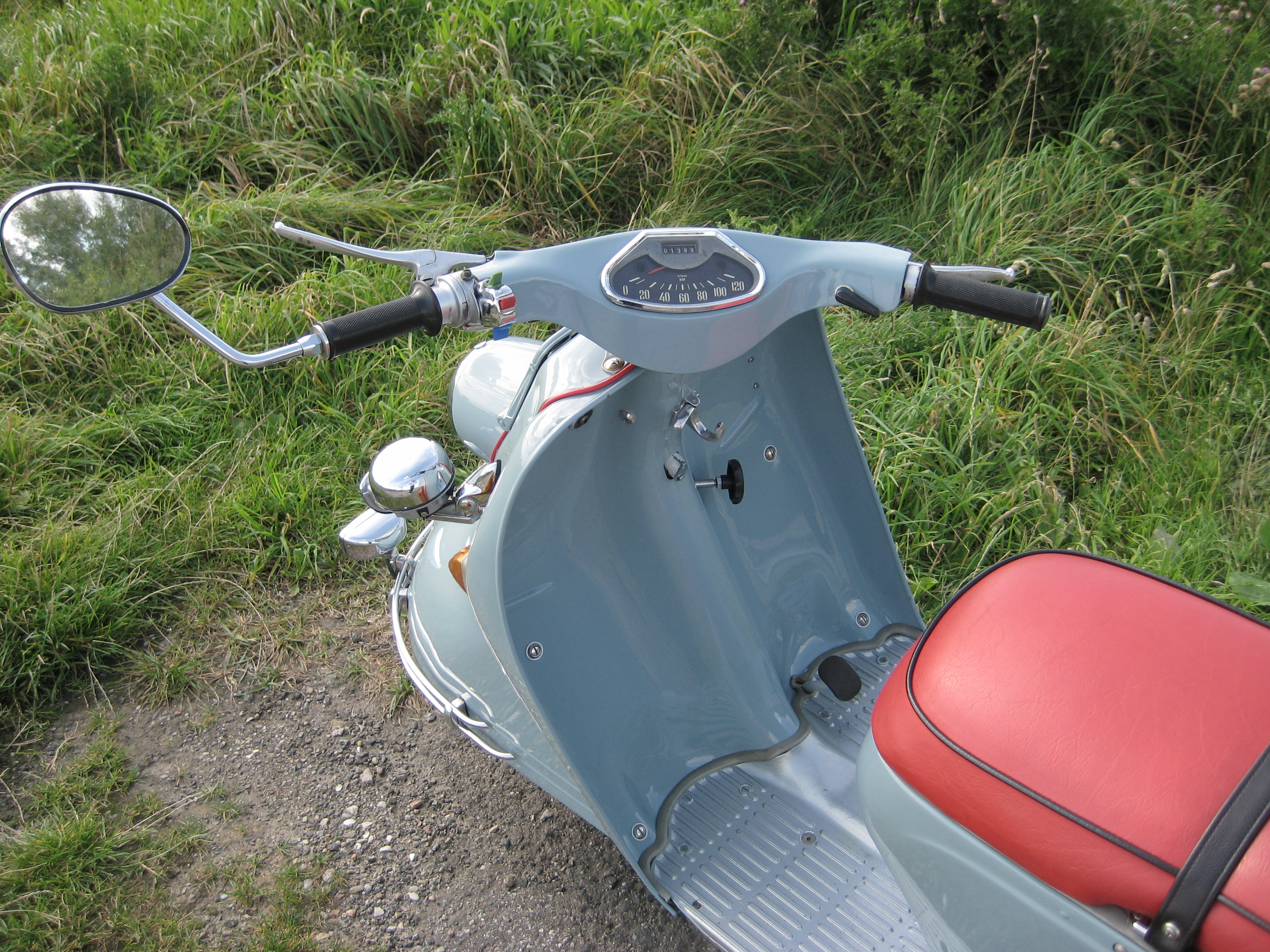
Cast handlebar with integral speedometer

=== 103 A2 ===
Production of the final series of Heinkel Tourist, the 103 A2, began in August 1960. The telescopic forks of the previous series were replaced by a two-sided trailing-link fork late in the A2 production run. The rear body panel was restyled and was not interchangeable with those of earlier series.

55,000 Tourist 103 A2s were built before production of the Heinkel Tourist ended on 31 December 1965.

Heinkel Tourist 103 A2
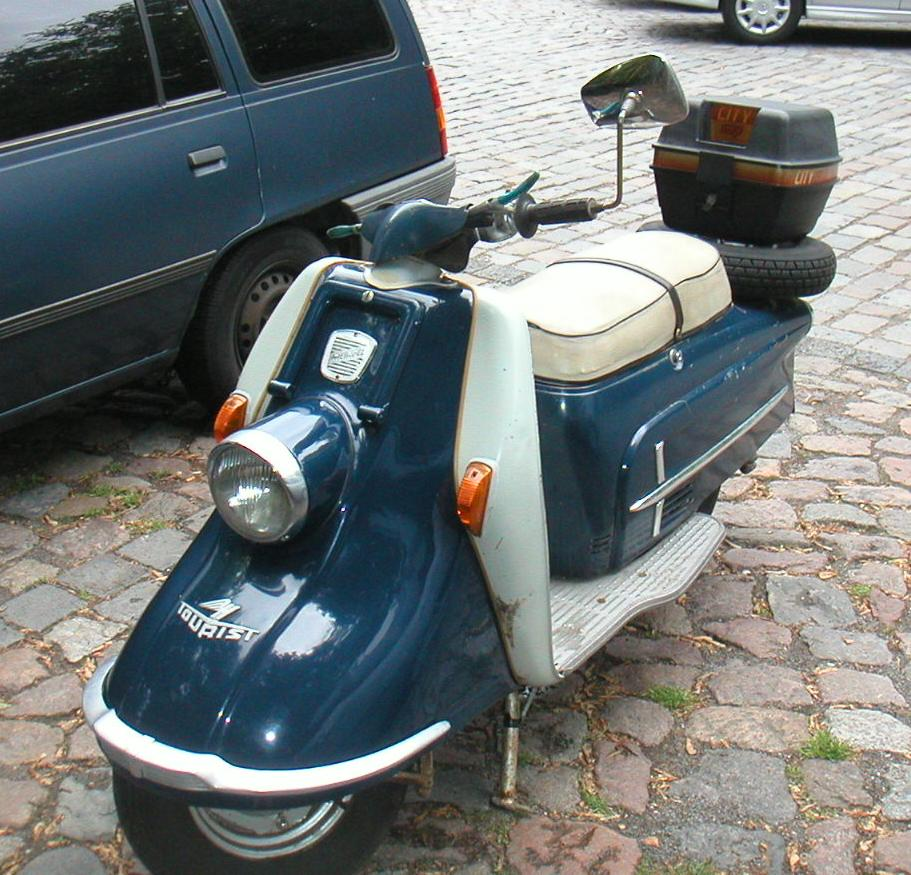
Heinkel Tourist 103 A2

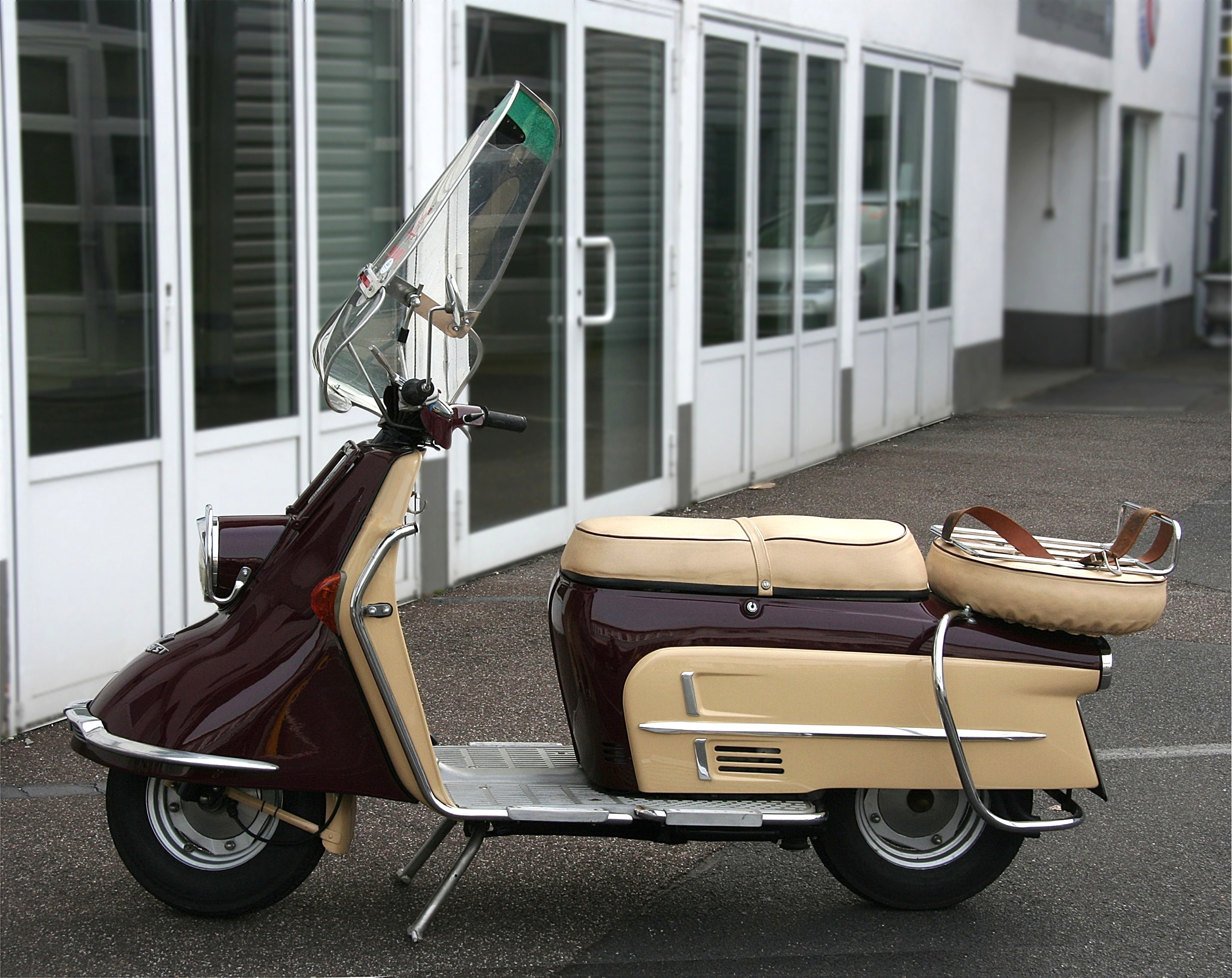
103 A2 with the new long rear

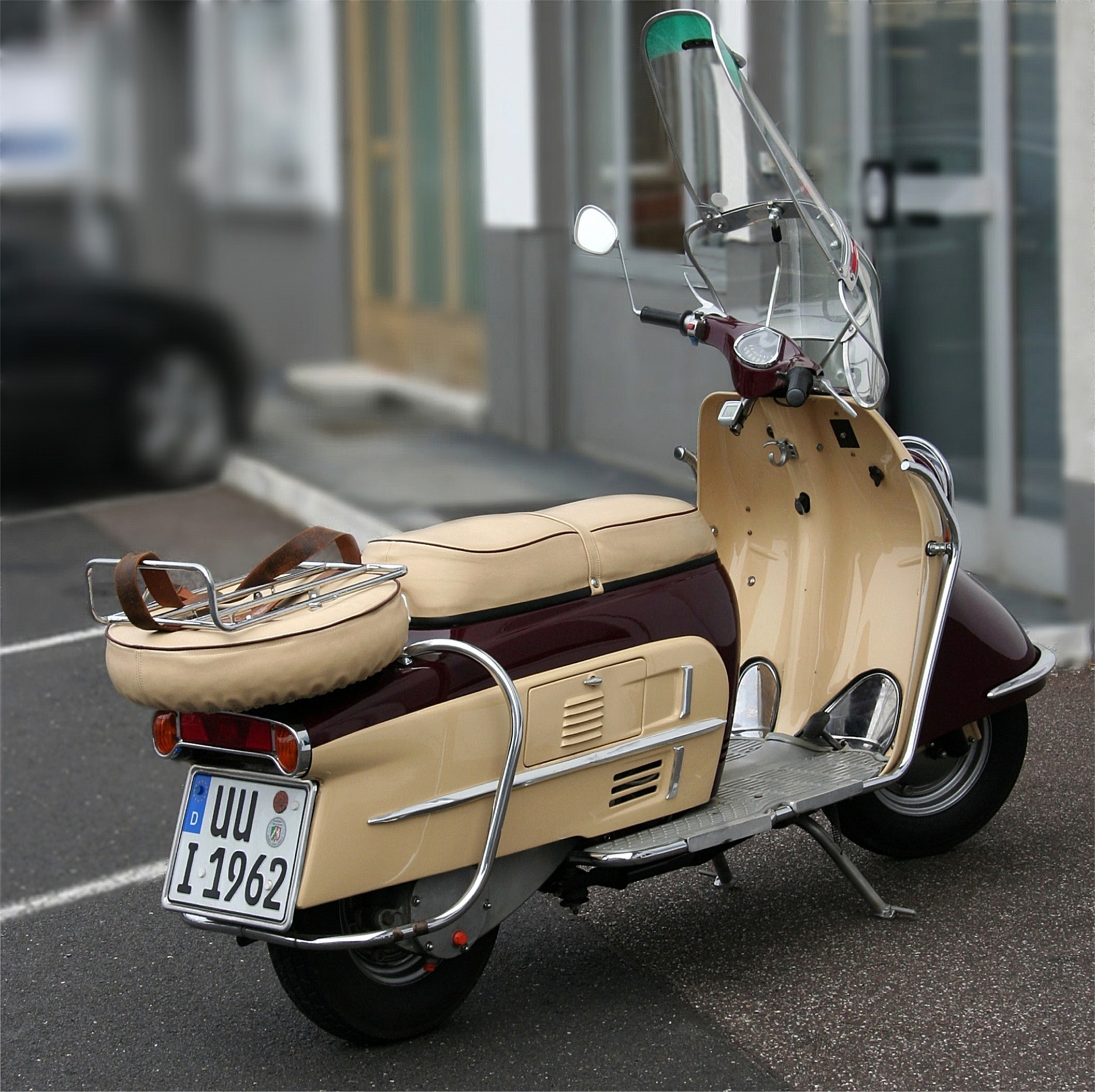
Rear of the 103 A2

== Specifications ==
Specifications for Heinkel Tourist by series
Series	Years built	Engine capacity (cc)	Bore × stroke (mm)	Wheelbase (mm)	Length (mm)	Width (mm)	Height (mm)	Kerb weight (kg)	Wheels
101 A0	1953 – 1954	149	59.0 × 54.5	1330	1980	710	980	129	4.00 × 8"
102 A1	1954 – 1955	174	60.0 × 61.5	1330	1980	710	980	133	4.00 × 8"
103 A0	1955 – 1957	174	60.0 × 61.5	1370	2060	710	1000	152	4.00 × 10"
103 A1	1957 – 1960	174	60.0 × 61.5	1375	2085	710	1000	156	4.00 × 10"
103 A2	1960 – 1965	174	60.0 × 61.5	1380	2020	710	1000	148	4.00 × 10"

All Tourist scooters were powered by overhead valve four-stroke single-cylinder engines.

== Export ==
=== United Kingdom ===
The Coventry-based Excelsior motorcycle manufacturer began importing HeinkelTourist scooters into the United Kingdom in late 1955. In late 1956, Nobel Motors of Picadilly became the new official importer of Heinkel scooters and bubble cars.

By the end of 1957, the UK importer of Heinkel scooters was International Sales of Dublin. This may have been part of a deal by which an Irish engineering company to build the Heinkel Kabine bubble car under licence.

Importation of the 103 A2 began in February 1962 by Hans Motors of London, which had an all-German staff. Trojan Cars Ltd., the manufacturers of the Kabine under licence at the time, was already selling Lambretta scooters and did not accept the offer to import Heinkel Tourists.

=== United States ===
Heinkel Tourists were imported into the United States by a succession of authorized distributors:

- East Land Motors of Brooklyn, New York, 1957
- International Scooters Corporation of Long Island City, New York, 1959-63 . Their contracted sub-distributors were:
  - Schleichler Motors of Oakland, California, for the West Coast
  - Triangle Motorcycles of Chicago, Illinois, for the Midwest
- Scooterama of San Francisco, California, 1963–64
- Schleichler Motors of Oakland, California, 1964–65

Approximately 350 Heinkel Tourists were sold in the United States.

== Heinkel Tourists in popular culture ==
I See By My Outfit, by American author Peter S. Beagle, recounts a cross-country (New York to San Francisco) journey that he and a friend accomplished on a pair of Heinkel Tourists. Though precise dates are not given in the text, context places the trip around 1960.

== See also ==
- Maicoletta – large scooter built by Maico
- Zündapp Bella – large scooter built by Zündapp
- List of motorcycles of the 1950s
