= Heinkel Kabine =

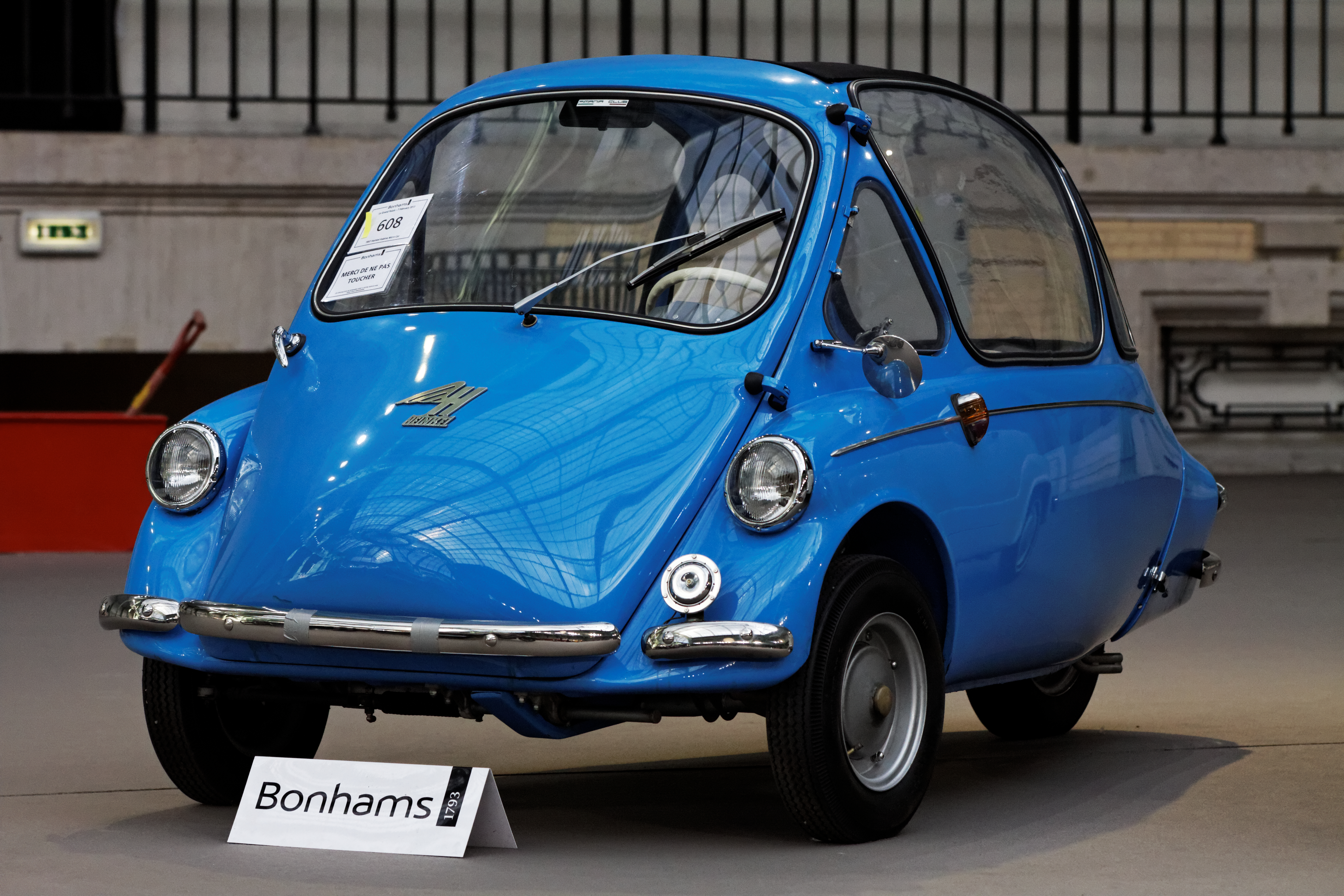

Overview
- Manufacturer: Heinkel Flugzeugwerke (1956–58); Dundalk Engineering Company (Ireland, 1958); Trojan (UK, 1960–66); Los Cedros S.A. (Argentina, 1960–65)
- Also called: Trojan 200

Body and chassis
- Class: Microcar
- Body style: One-door sedan
- Layout: RMR layout, three- or four-wheels

Powertrain
- Engine: Heinkel four-stroke single-cylinder engine
- Transmission: 4-speed plus reverse.

Dimensions
- Length: 2,550 mm (100.4 in)
- Width: 1,370 mm (53.9 in)
- Height: 1,320 mm (52.0 in)
- Curb weight: 243 kg (535.7 lb)

The Heinkel Kabine was a microcar designed by Heinkel Flugzeugwerke and built by them from 1956 to 1958. Production was transferred under licence to Dundalk Engineering Company in Ireland in 1958. However, the licence was withdrawn shortly afterwards due to poor quality control. Production restarted in 1960, again under licence, under the Trojan 200 name by Trojan Cars Ltd. in the UK, and continued until 1966.

Heinkel Kabines were also assembled under licence by Los Cedros S.A. from 1959 until 1962. As Heinkel in Argentina, they were built alongside Studebaker pickups.

The Kabine Model 150 used the 174 cc 9.2 hp single-cylinder four-stroke engine that powered the Heinkel Tourist scooter. In October 1956, Heinkel introduced the Kabine Model 153 (with three wheels) and the Kabine Model 154 (with four wheels), both with 204 cc engines. The engines in these models were later reduced in capacity to 198 cc for insurance purposes.

The Kabine had a steel unit body. Access to the interior was by an opening front. In order not to infringe Iso Rivolta's patent used on the Isetta, the steering wheel did not hinge outwards with the door to ease passenger access. However, it did feature a reverse gear, unlike some other bubble cars. The fabric sun roof served as an emergency escape hatch should the sole door in front become jammed in a collision.

The Kabine featured prominently in the 1959 film I'm All Right Jack and the 1961 film Murder in Eden, and was briefly featured in the 1957 films Blue Murder at St Trinian's and The Naked Truth (a.k.a. Your Past Is Showing).

"Kabine" is the German word for "cabin".

== Specifications ==
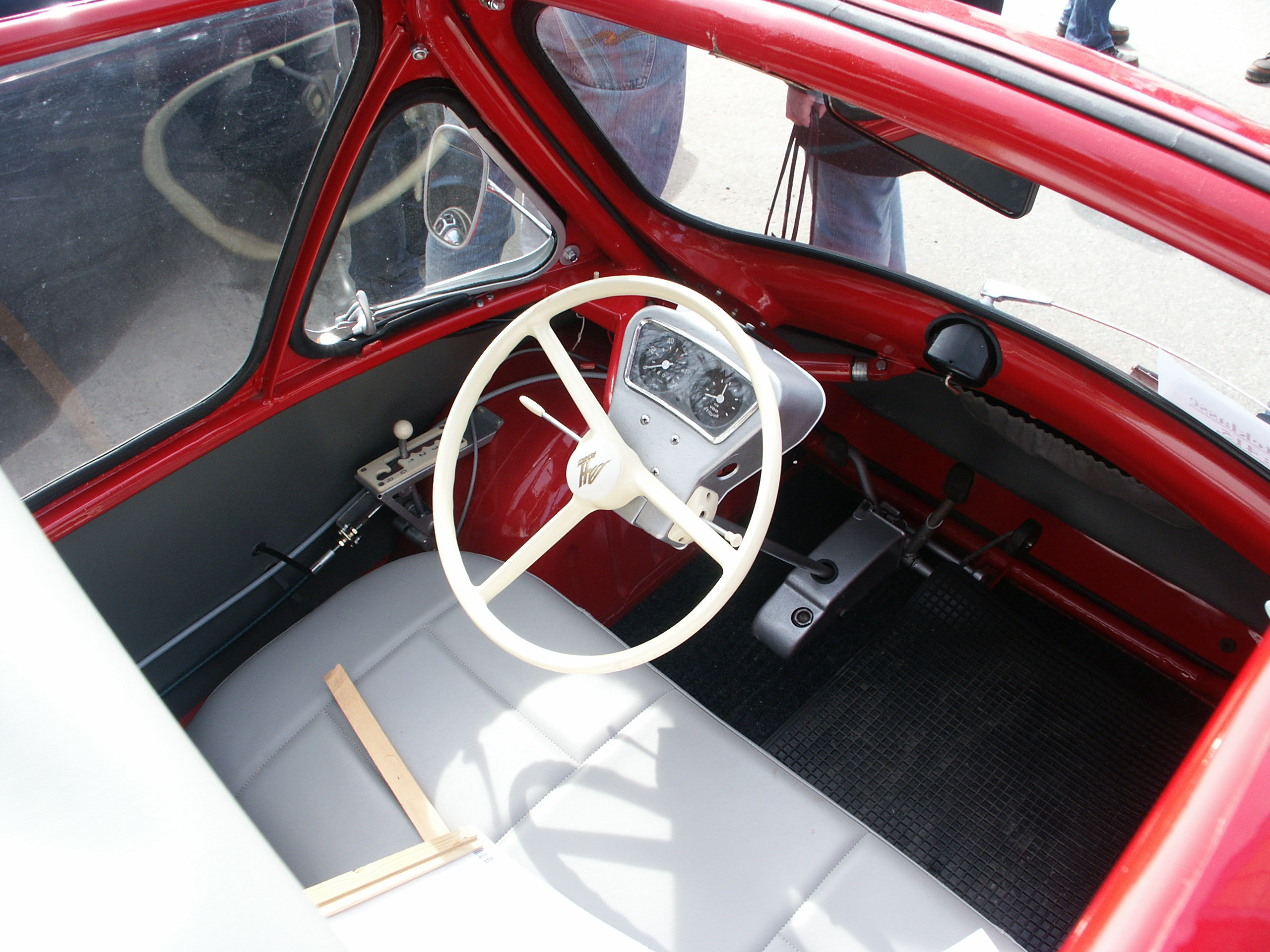
Heinkel Tourist interior Photo by Frode Inge Helland

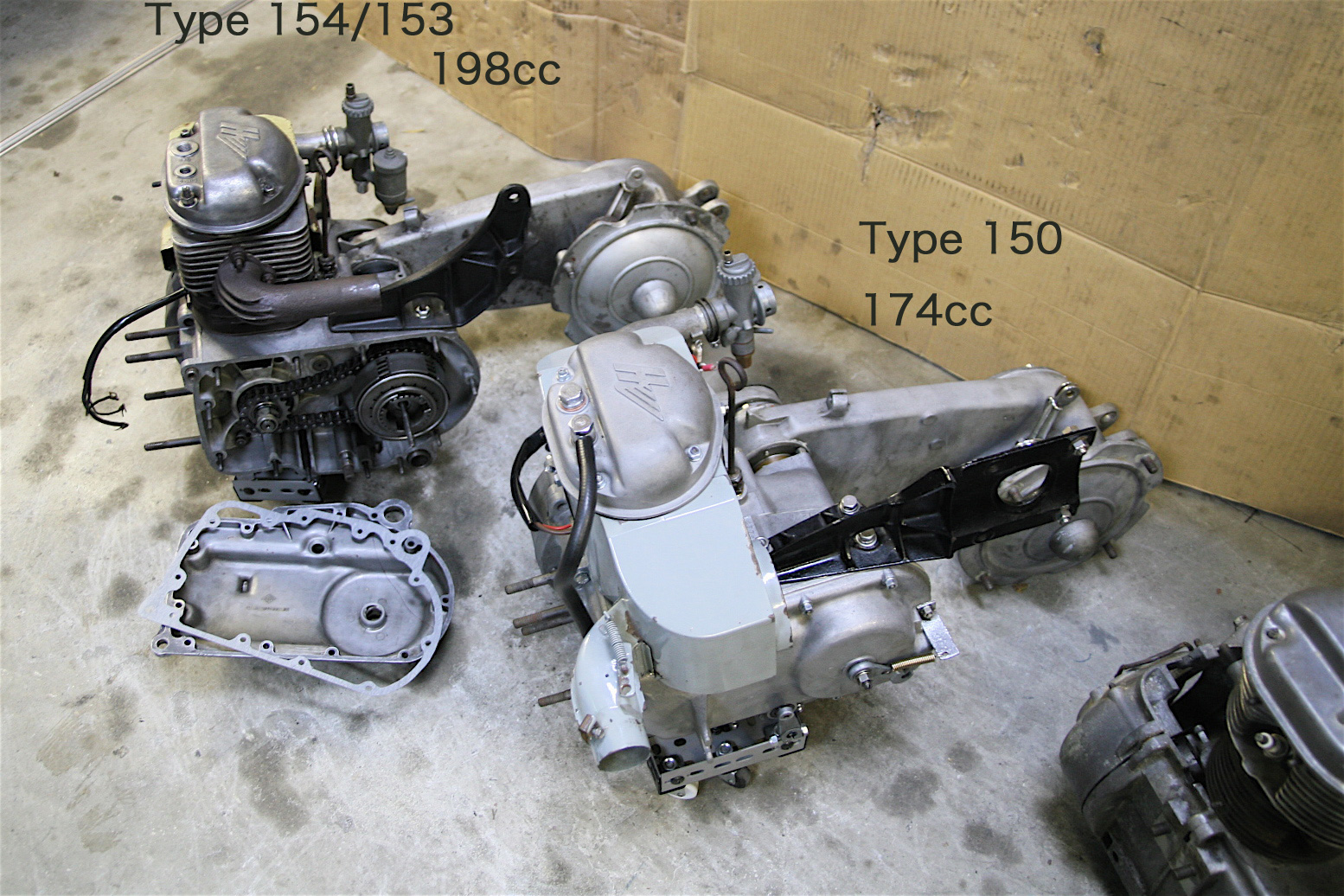
Heinkel Kabine engines

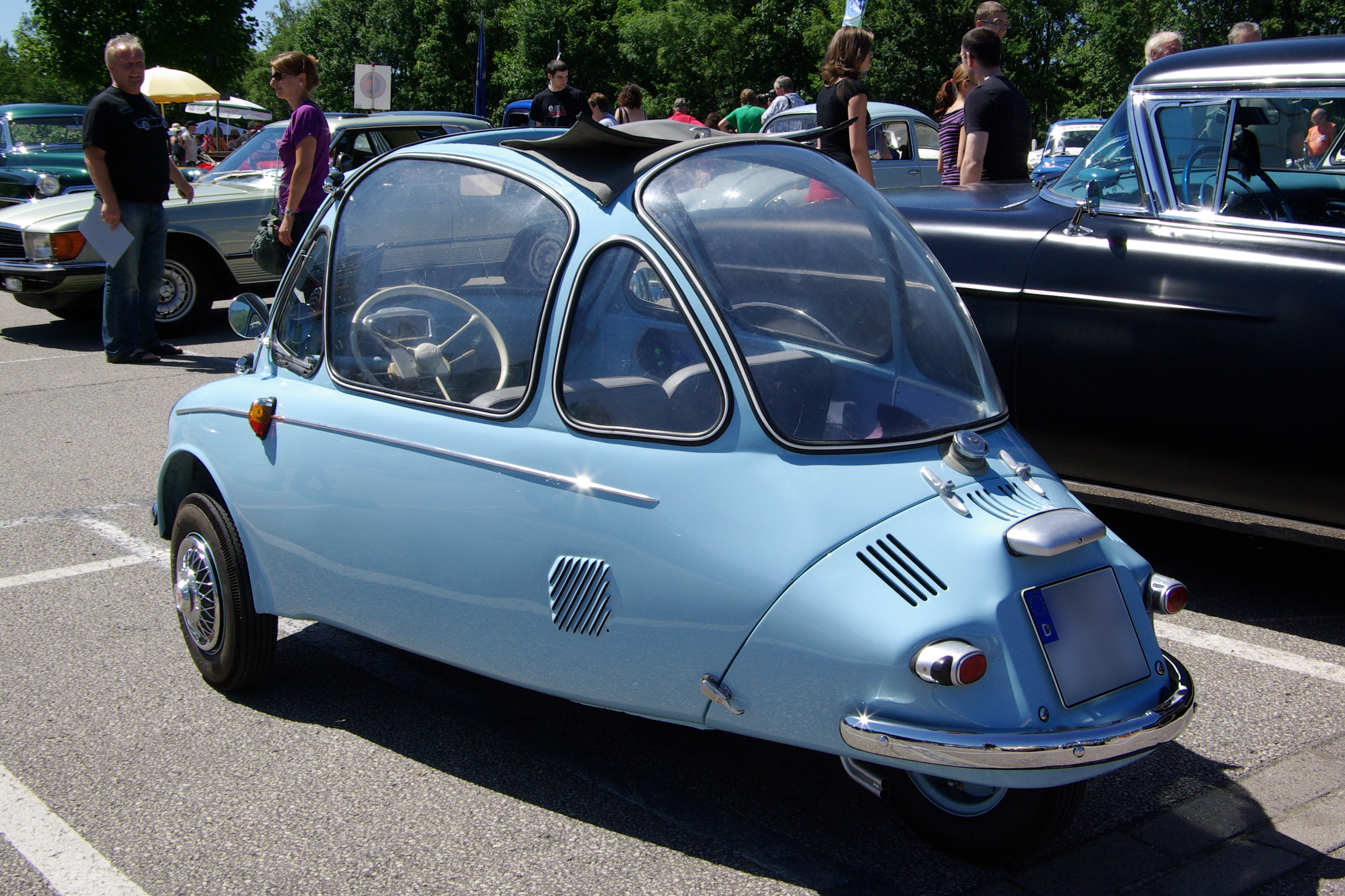
Rear 3/4 view of 1961 Trojan 200

Type:	175 Typ 153	200 Typ 154	200 Typ 154
Production dates	1956–57	1956	1957–58
Engine	1-cylinder air-cooled 4-stroke		
Valvetrain	overhead valve (ohv)		
Bore x stroke	60 mm (2.4 in) x 61.5 mm (2.4 in)	65 mm (2.6 in) x 61.5 mm (2.4 in)	64 mm (2.5 in) x 61.5 mm (2.4 in)
Displacement	174 cc	204 cc	198 cc
Power	6.8 kW (9.2 PS; 9.1 hp) at 5500 rpm	7.4 kW (10.1 PS; 9.9 hp) at 5500 rpm	7.4 kW (10.1 PS; 9.9 hp) at 5500 rpm
Maximum torque	12.9 N⋅m (9.5 lb⋅ft) at 4450 rpm	13.2 N⋅m (9.7 lb⋅ft) at 4700 rpm	13.2 N⋅m (9.7 lb⋅ft) at 4700 rpm
Compression	7.4 : 1	6.8 : 1	6.8 : 1
Electrical	12 volt		
Transmission	4-speed shifter at the left side (Kulissenschaltung)		
Structure	"Motocoupé" with front door		
Curb weight	250 kg (551 lb)	290 kg (639 lb)	290 kg (639 lb)
GVWR	475 kg (1,047 lb)	510 kg (1,124 lb)	510 kg (1,124 lb)
Length x width x height	2550 x 1370 x 1,320 mm (52.0 in)		
Wheelbase	1,760 mm (69.3 in)		
Track front/rear	1225 mm / 0	1225 mm / 220 mm	1225 mm / 220 mm
Turning radius	8,5 m		
Tire size	4.40–10"	4.40–10"	4.40–10"
Fuel economy	ca. 4 L/100 km (~58.8 mpg)		
Top speed	87 km/h (54 mph)	90 km/h (56 mph)	90 km/h (56 mph)

== See also ==
- Isetta
- List of microcars
