= Maicoletta =

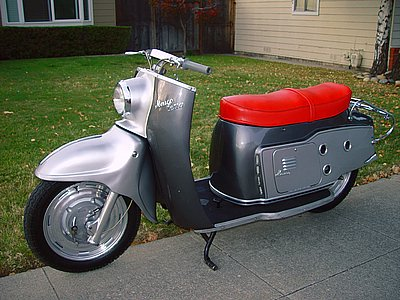
- Manufacturer: Maico
- Production: 1954-1966
- Assembly: Pfäffingen, Ammerbuch, Germany
- Class: scooter
- Engine: Fan-cooled two-stroke single-cylinder engine, 174 cc (10.6 cu in), 247 cc (15.1 cu in), or 277 cc (16.9 cu in)
- Bore / stroke: 61 mm × 59.5 mm 2.40 in × 2.34 in (174 cc); 67 mm × 70 mm 2.6 in × 2.8 in (247 cc); 71 mm × 70 mm 2.8 in × 2.8 in (277 cc)
- Top speed: 68 mph (109 km/h) (247cc)
- Power: 14.0 bhp (10.4 kW) at 5100 rpm (247 cc); 16.2 bhp (12.1 kW) (247 cc)
- Transmission: 4 speed manual with heel-and-toe shifter pedal, enclosed chain drive
- Frame type: tubular steel frame with pressed steel body panels
- Suspension: Front: telescopic forks Rear: Swingarm with coil springs and dampers
- Brakes: Front: 6.5-inch (165.10 mm) drum Rear: drum
- Tires: 14 inch front and rear
- Dimensions: L: 81 in (2,100 mm); W: 25 in (640 mm); H: 38 in (970 mm)
- Seat height: 29 in (740 mm)
- Weight: 322 lb (146 kg) (wet)
- Fuel capacity: 2.625 imp gal (11.93 L)
- Oil capacity: 24:1 petrol/oil mixture
- Fuel consumption: 71 mpg_{‑imp} (4.0 L/100 km) (with 247 cc engine)
- Related: Maico Mobil

The Maicoletta was a motor scooter built by Maico from 1955 to 1966. It was noted by motorcycle journalists in the United States and the United Kingdom for being powerful, responsive, and comfortable. It was one of the heaviest and most expensive motor scooters with typical styling and engineering of its time, and comparable to other manufacturers' products such as Heinkel Tourist, Zündapp Bella and the British Triumph Tigress and BSA Sunbeam.

The Maicoletta was highly regarded in the United Kingdom. When Maico stopped making the Maicoletta, the U.K. importer built more of them from its spare parts inventory.

The two-stroke engine of the Maicoletta used an unusual starter that rocked the crankshaft back and forth before firing instead of rotating it.

== History ==
The Maicoletta was introduced in 1955. It used components based on those used in Maico's conventional motorcycles, including the engine, transmission, and front forks. It was built to compete in the German scooter market of the 1950s. Maico had earlier introduced an enclosed motorcycle with superior weather protection for the rider, the Maico Mobil, that was marketed as a "two-wheeled car" with interchangeable wheels and a spare wheel mounted into the barrel shaped bodywork behind the number plate and rear lamp. The Maicoletta used the fourteen-inch wheels, gear ratio indicator, and headlights from the Mobil.

When the Maicoletta was first exported to the United Kingdom, it was one of the heaviest and most expensive scooters sold there. Though known as the “dustbin” amongst British scooterists with Italianate tastes, it gained a reputation in the U.K. as a high-quality, heavy, powerful, scooter capable of being ridden in comfort over long distances. The brakes were noted at the time by Motor Cycling and Scooter Weekly for being powerful and progressive in that the braking force increased with increased effort against the braking controls. The optional 277 cc engine was considered particularly useful with a sidecar combination, as was the steering damper.

Maico stopped offering the 174 cc and 277 cc engine options in 1962 and ended production of the Maicoletta in 1966. Demand for Maicolettas in the U.K. was such that the importer used its inventory of spare parts to build new Maicolettas to special order until late 1967.

== Specifications ==
=== Frame and suspension ===
The Maicoletta had a tubular steel frame with pressed steel body panels. Front suspension was with a telescopic fork with coil springs, hydraulic damping, and a steering damper. Rear suspension was with a swingarm with dual coil springs and twin hydraulic dampers. The wheels were 14 inches in diameter and had a width between 3.25 inches and 3.5 inches. Drum brakes were used front and rear. The front drums were 6.5 inches (165.1 mm) in diameter, while the rear brake was either six inches (152.4 mm) or five inches (127 mm) in diameter.

=== Drivetrain ===
The Maicoletta had a fan-cooled single-cylinder piston port two-stroke engine, originally of either 174 cc or 247 cc. A 277 cc engine became available in 1957. The transmission had four ratios and was controlled by a heel-and-toe pedal. The engine and transmission were mounted on the frame and drove the rear wheel through an enclosed drive chain.

==== Pendulum starter ====
The Maicoletta used a Bosch six volt 'pendulum' electric starter system. When activated, instead of rotating the crankshaft, the starter used the generator coils on the shaft to rock it back and forth under the control of cams on the crankshaft. These cams closed contacts in the starter to trigger a reversing switch in the control box that changed the crankshaft direction at the end of each swing. This gives the impression of the crankshaft continually bouncing back and forwards against compression, when operated. A separate set of ignition points fired the spark plug in the forward direction only, and when this fires the mixture in the cylinder the engine starts to rotate normally, the starter is released and the normal ignition system takes over. This system was possible due to the piston port induction system of the two-stroke engine.

The advantage of this system is that the starter does not have to force the crankshaft to turn over against compression, so less power is required from the 6 volt system. Its disadvantage is the unusually large number of contacts, which can be difficult to adjust. The reversing switch contacts tend to wear out with extended use and can be very difficult to service or to have serviced, hence the scooter's reputation for requiring roll starts later in life. The Maicoletta did not have a kick starter.

=== Ergonomics ===
The Maicoletta was noted for being large and comfortable, with an exceptionally large and commodious dual seat and room for the rider and passenger to move around and avoid fatigue.

The Maicoletta had a dashboard with a speedometer and an eight-day clock. A gear ratio indicator was incorporated in the speedometer.

The drivetrain was covered by the rear bodywork, which could be removed as a unit by loosening one bolt and unplugging the lead to the taillight. Access to the fuel cap and the spark plug was also available by unlocking and lifting the hinged seat, and an access panel on the left side allowed access to the carburettor.

One ergonomic concern was the considerable effort required to mount the Maicoletta on its centre stand. This made it difficult for small riders or riders of slight build to park the scooter. Another concern was the cold-start lever, which was positioned below the glove box and was not readily visible.

Maicoletta
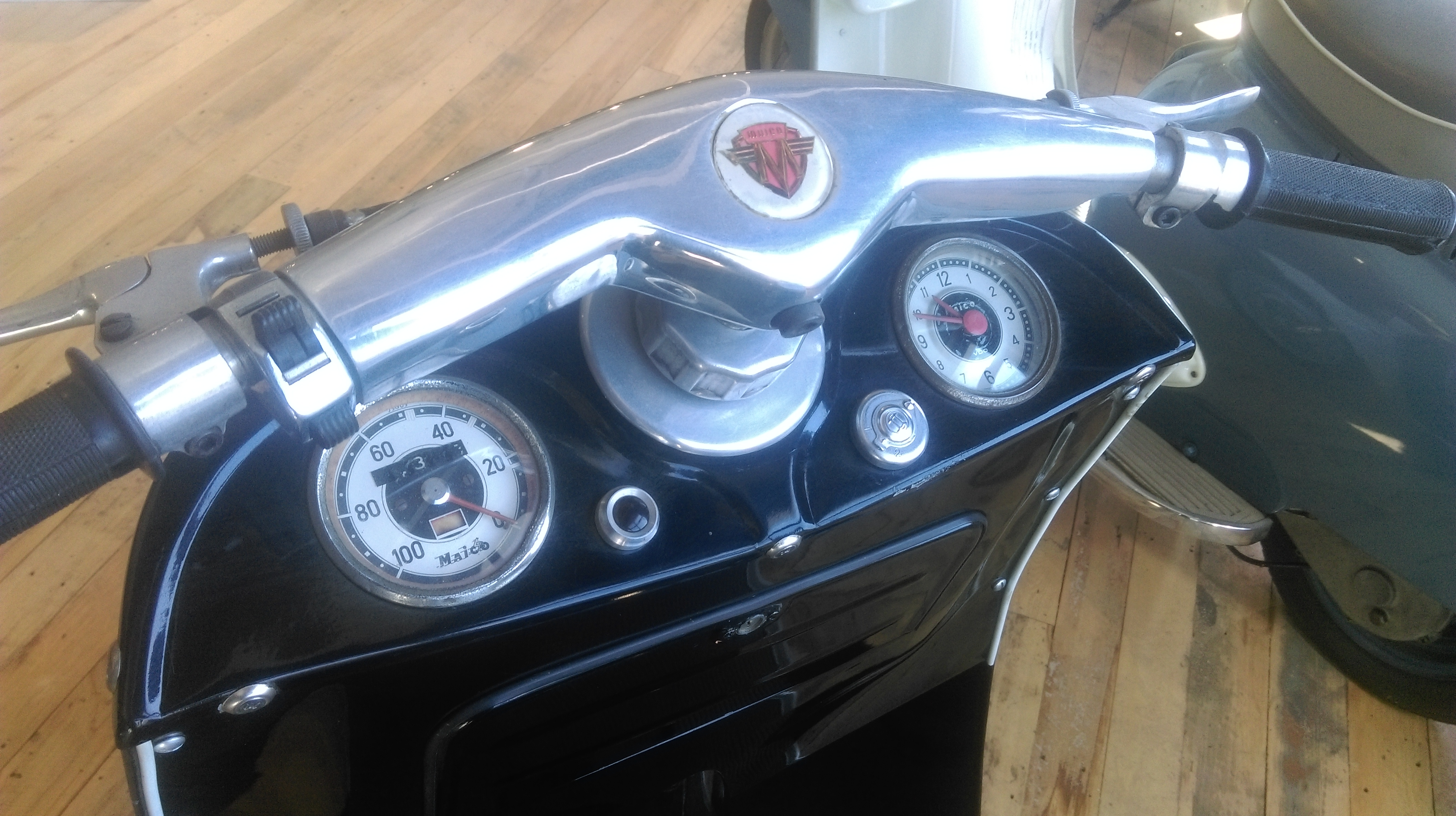
Maicoletta Dash

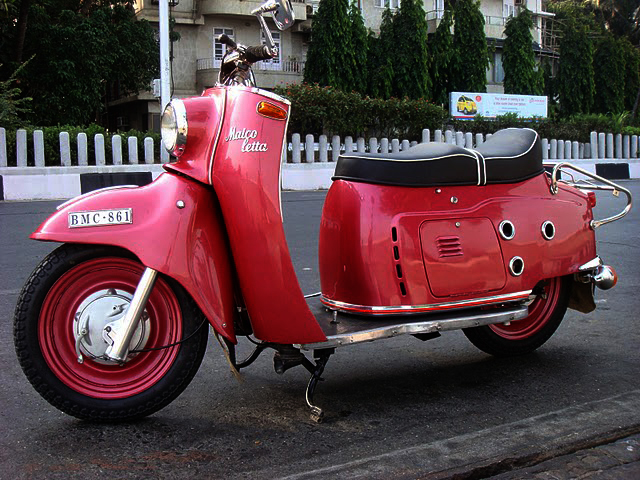
Maicoletta, front left view

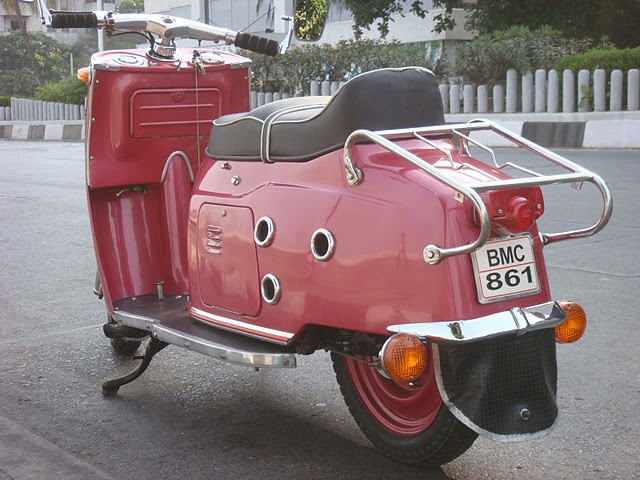
Maicoletta, rear left view

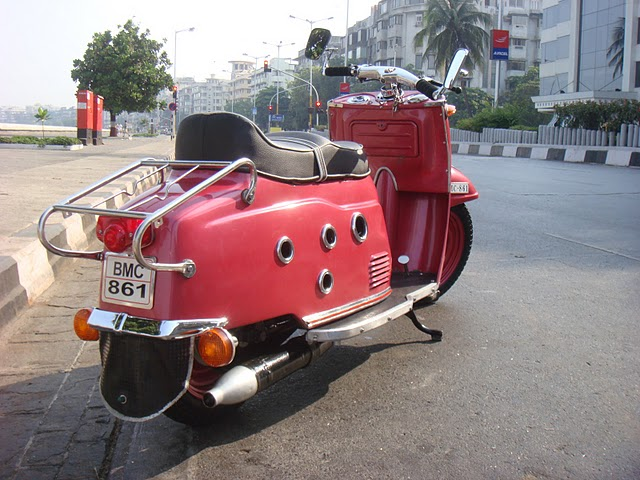
Maicoletta, rear right view

== See also ==
- List of motorcycles of the 1950s
