= Maico Mobil =

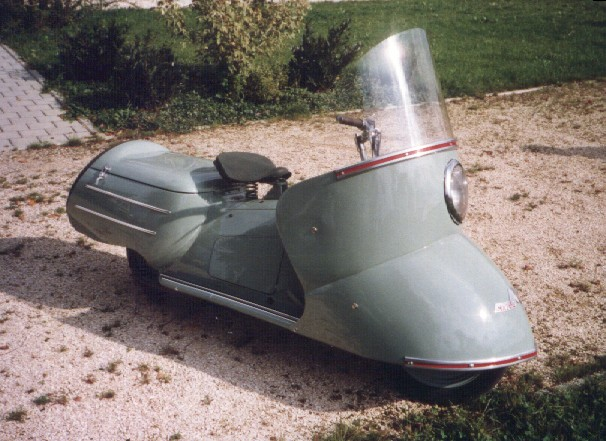
- Maico Mobil
- Manufacturer: Maico
- Also called: Maicomobil
- Production: 1950-1958
- Assembly: Pfäffingen, Germany
- Class: Touring motorcycle
- Engine: two-stroke single-cylinder engine
- Transmission: MB150 & MB175 – 3-speed with twist grip control MB200 – 4-speed with heel-and-toe pedal
- Frame type: tubular steel space frame
- Suspension: Front: telescopic forks Rear: Swingarm with coil spring and damper
- Tires: 3.00-14, front and rear
- Fuel capacity: 8.5 L
- Oil capacity: petrol/oil mixture
- Related: Maicoletta

The Maico Mobil is an early touring motorcycle made by Maico between 1950 and 1958. Conceived and marketed as a “car on two wheels”, the Mobil had body panels that enclosed the drivetrain, protected its riders from the elements, and included an integral pair of panniers and a mount for a spare tyre.

== Frame, body, and suspension ==
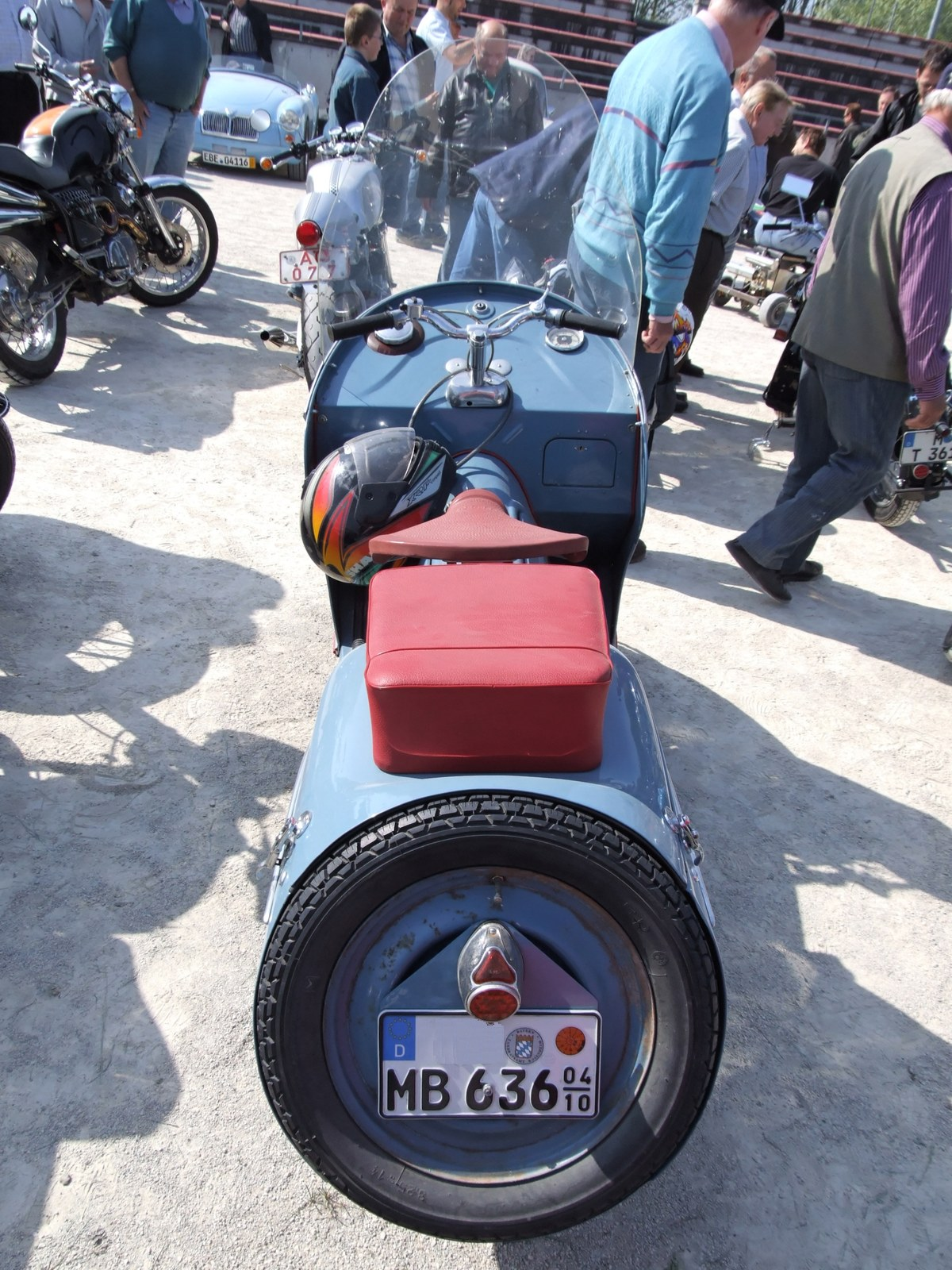
Rear view of Maico Mobil, showing the windscreen, the dashboard, the glovebox, the storage latches, and the rear-mounted spare wheel.

The Mobil had a tubular steel space frame on to which steel and aluminum body panels were bolted. A large front fairing enclosed the front wheel. Mounted on the fairing were a transparent plastic windscreen that wrapped around the handlebars, a dashboard through which the steering column protruded, and lower panels containing a glovebox and provision for a car radio to be installed. Mounted on the dashboard were the ignition switch, the speedometer, and the fuel filler cap; the fuel tank was mounted to the frame under the dashboard.

The rear bodywork included a pair of integral panniers and a rear mount for a spare wheel. The panniers were accessed by unlatching a panel under the pillion.

The Mobil used telescopic front forks and a rear swingarm.

== Engine and transmission ==
The Mobil originally had a 150 cc single-cylinder two-stroke engine mounted between the dashboard and the rider's seat. Access panels on both sides of the Mobil could be removed to work on the engine. Power was transmitted through a three-speed transmission operated by a twist grip.

The capacity of the Mobil's engine was increased to 175 cc in 1953. An optional 200 cc became available in 1955, the same year that the three-speed twist-grip controlled transmission was replaced by a four-speed transmission controlled by a heel-and-toe pedal shifter.

== See also ==
- List of motorcycles of the 1950s
- List of motorcycles by type of engine
