= Trojan (automobile) =

British automobile manufacturer (1914–1965)

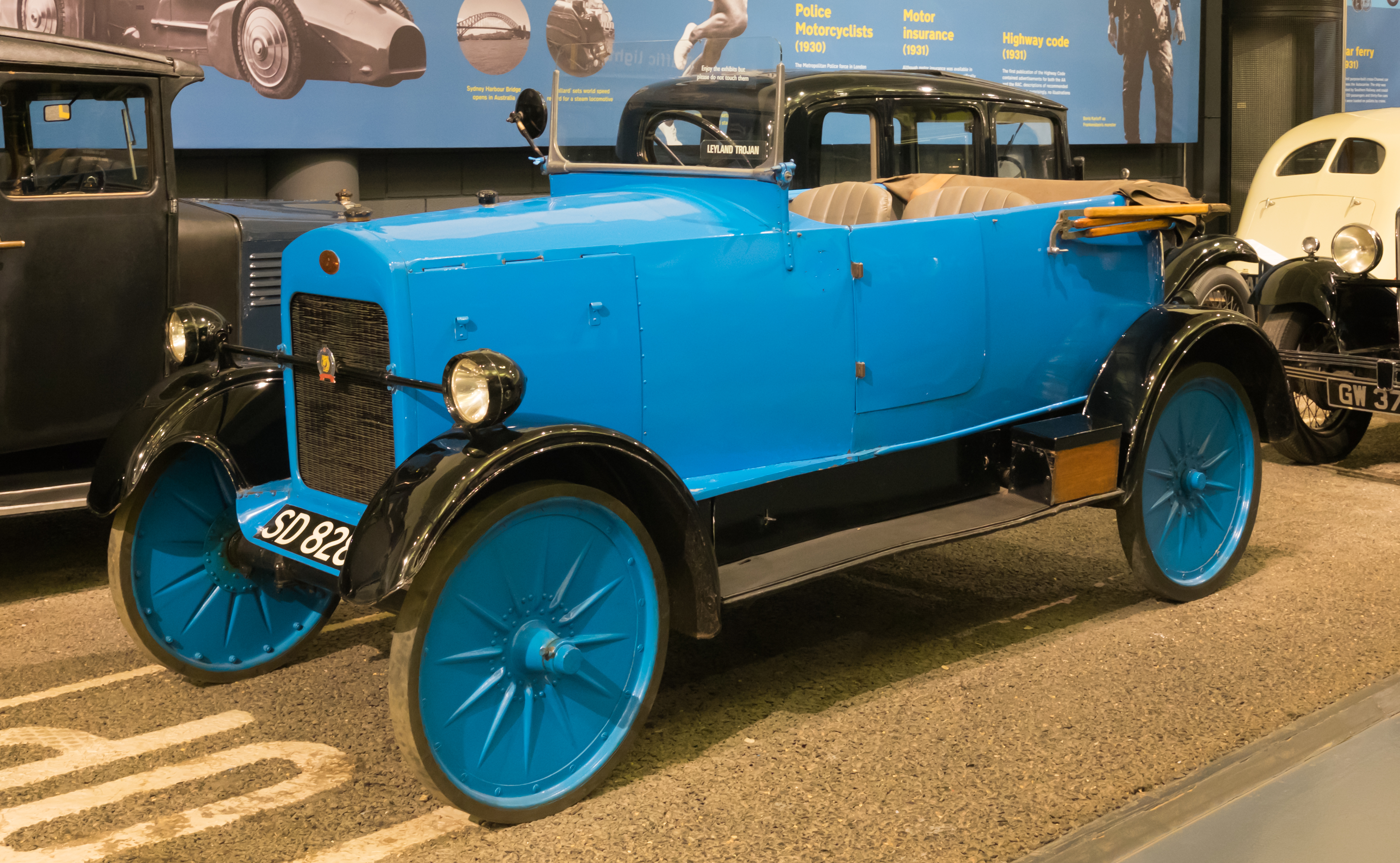
A 1924 Trojan automobile

Trojan was a British automobile manufacturer producing light cars between 1914 and 1965, and light commercial vehicles for a short time.

== Early history ==
The company was founded by Leslie Hayward Hounsfield (1877–1957) who went into business as a general engineer in a small workshop called the Polygon Engineering Works in Clapham, South London. He got the idea to make a simple, economical car that would be easy to drive and started design work in 1910. Hounsfield was a Whitworth Exhibitioner in 1898 and President of the Whitworth Society in 1946.

In 1913 a prototype was completed. It had a two-stroke engine with four cylinders arranged in pairs, and each pair shared a common combustion chamber – a doubled-up version of what would later be called the "split-single" engine. The pistons in each pair drove the crankshaft together as they were coupled to it by a V-shaped connecting rod. The claim was that each engine had only seven moving parts, four pistons, two connecting rods and a crankshaft. This was connected to a two-speed epicyclic gearbox, to simplify gear changing, and a chain to the rear wheels. Solid tyres were used, (even though these were antiquated for car use), to prevent punctures and very long springs used to give some comfort.

War broke out before production could start, and from 1914 to 1918, Trojan Ltd, as the company had become in 1914, made production tools and gauges. In 1920 the first series of six cars was made from a works in Croydon · · and the final production version was shown at the 1922 London Motor Show. An agreement was reached with Leyland Motors to produce the cars at their Kingston upon Thames factory · · · · , where work on reconditioning former Royal Air Force wartime trucks was running down. This arrangement continued until 1928, when Leyland wanted factory space for truck production. During the nearly seven years of the agreement 11,000 cars and 6700 vans were made.

== Trojan Utility Car ==
The Trojan Utility Car entered the market at £230, which was reduced to £125 in 1925, the same as a Model T Ford. Nothing was conventional. Rather than a chassis the car had a punt shaped tray which housed the engine and transmission below the seats. The transmission used a chain to drive the solid tyre shod wheels. The 1527 cc engine to the ingenious Hounsfield design was started by pulling a lever on the right of the driver. To prove how economical the car was to run, the company ran the slogan "Can you afford to walk?" and calculated that over 200 miles (320 km) it would cost more in shoes and socks than to cover the distance by Trojan car.

A modified car was released in 1920 with a smaller 1488 cc engine to bring it into the sub-1.5-litre class and with pneumatic tyres available as an option; the car was guaranteed for 5,000 miles (8,000 km). A major contract was agreed with Brooke Bond tea for delivery vans, making the car familiar all over Britain, and with a top speed of 38 mph (61 km/h), not causing too much worry over speeding drivers.

== RE Trojan and the 1930s ==
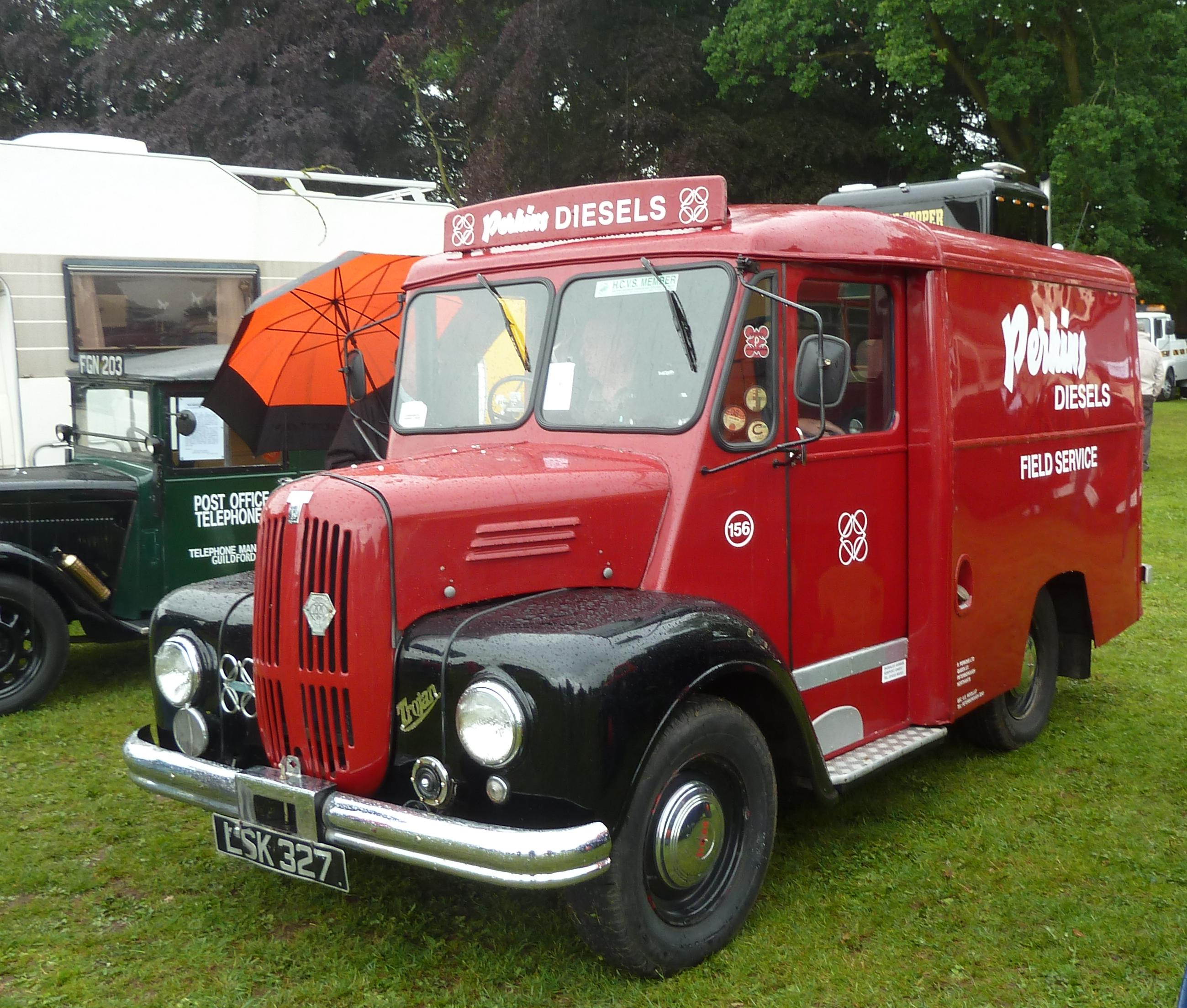
1950s diesel van, with Perkins engine and operated by Perkins themselves

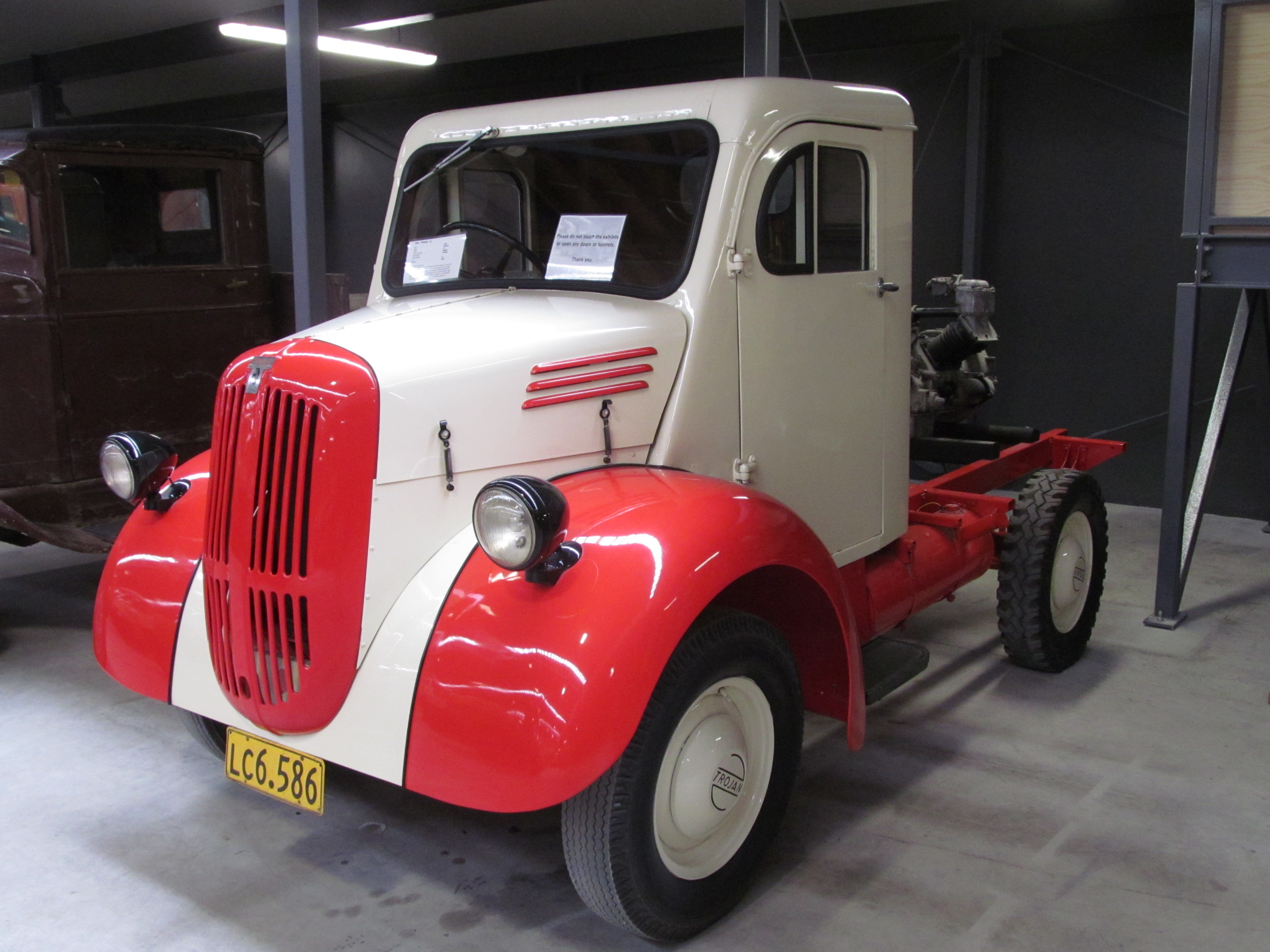
1953 Trojan 15 in a New Zealand museum

With the ending of the Leyland partnership, Leslie Hounsfield took production back to Croydon, although at new premises, with Leyland continuing to supply some parts until the early 1930s. In spite of new body styles, sales of the cars were falling, so a new model, the RE, or Rear Engine, capable of 45 mph (72 km/h), was announced in 1931. Still without an electric starter and with only rear-wheel braking, it was beginning to look very old fashioned and, although more modern bodies were fitted, only about 250 were sold.

A final attempt was the Wayfarer of 1934, with the engine back in the middle, but fitted with a three-speed gearbox and shaft drive. However, only three were sold and the 6-cylinder Mastra did no better, with only two produced. Nevertheless, the original van continued to sell well, and the Utility car could still be ordered; the last one was delivered in 1937.

Leslie Hounsfield had left the company in 1930 to set up a new enterprise making, amongst other things, the "Safari" camp bed, which would be made in thousands during the Second World War.

Trojan Ltd continued to make vans until war broke out, and during hostilities made bomb racks and parachute containers. With peace, van production restarted, still using the original engine, but that was replaced by a Perkins diesel in 1952.

== Bubble and sports cars ==
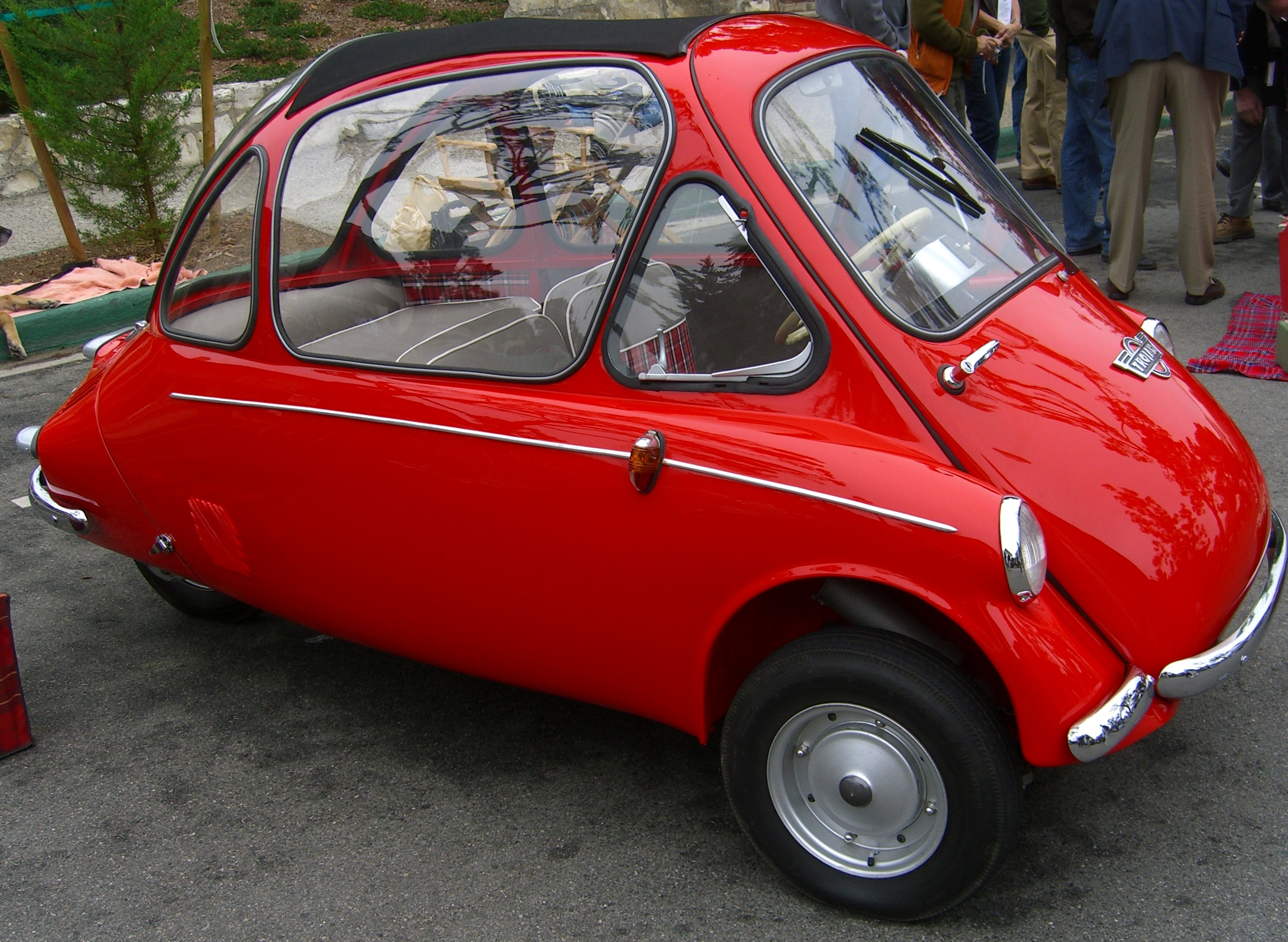
1963 Trojan 200

In 1959 the company was bought by Peter Agg and from 1960 to 1965 he built Heinkel bubble cars under licence, selling them as the Trojan 200, the last vehicle to bear the Trojan name. The company acquired the rights to build the Elva Courier sports car in 1962, producing 210 cars between 1962 and 1965 when production switched from road cars to the McLaren-Elva racing car.

The company existed as Trojan Limited (Company No 134254 having been incorporated on 27/02/1914) until 19/03/2013, but no longer operating from the Croydon factory, which had been sold, on which latter date it was dissolved via "Voluntary Strike-off".

== Trojan Trobike ==
Trobike was a type of mini-bike. Although preceded by the Second World War military Welbike and later Corgi for the civilian market, it was one of the earliest to be sold in kit form, thus avoiding purchase tax.

The Trojan Lambretta group was founded in 1959 when Lambretta Concessionaires Ltd took over Trojan Ltd, one of the oldest firms in the British motor industry. At about the time the group owned the Clinton Engine Corporation of Maquoketa, Iowa, USA.

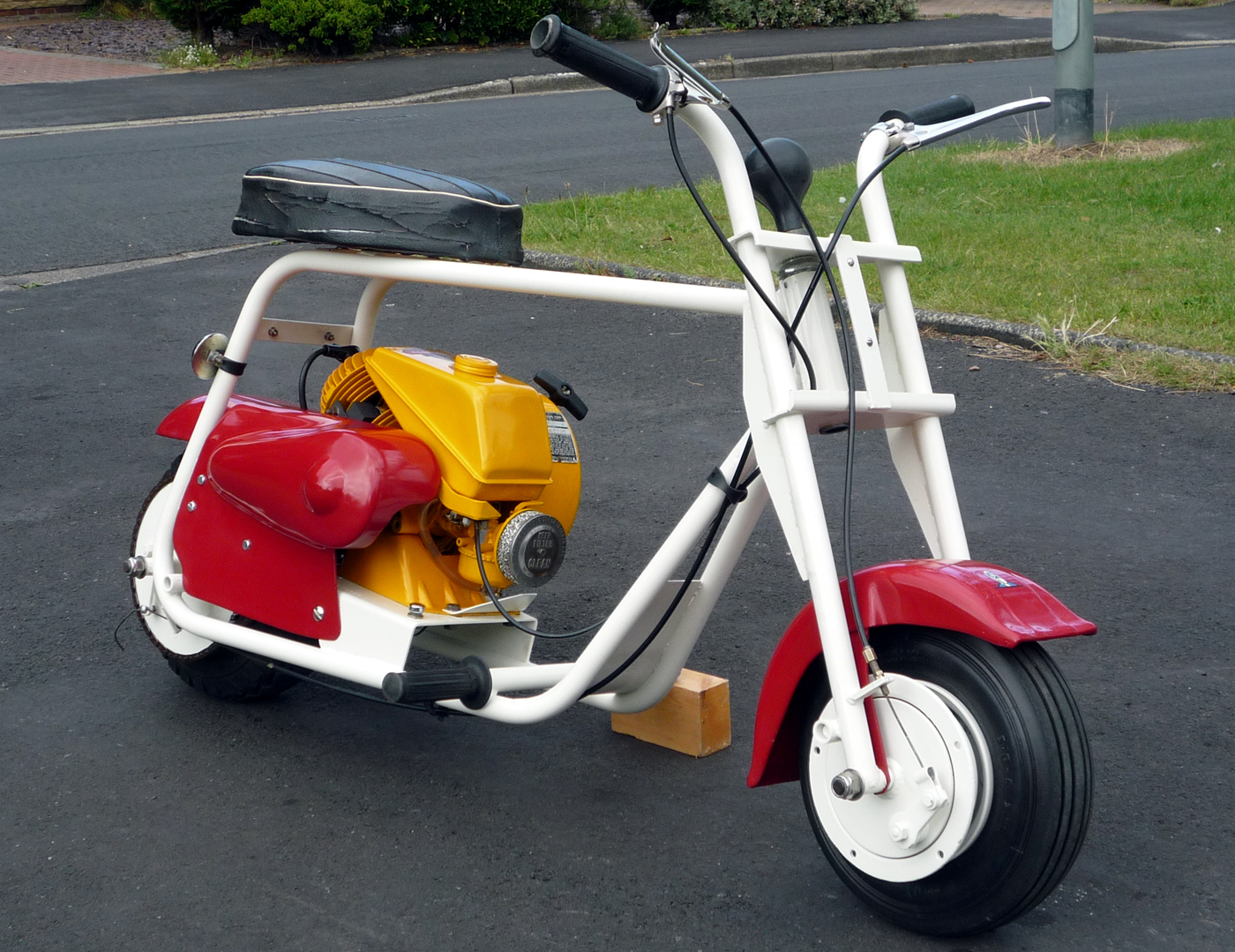
1961 Trojan Trobike

Trobike front mudguard decal

Clinton were world famous for their engines used in lawnmowers and chainsaws. At this time many were supplied for use in portable generators, paint sprayers etc.

During the late 1950s the British public was becoming aware of the craze sweeping teenage America – karting (or go-karting). The sport arrived in Britain with US servicemen bringing outfits over and even making their own.

At first, the most popular engine was the 2.5 hp 95 cc Clinton engine – being both readily available and cheap. By 1959 Trojan began making the Trokart using this engine. It was sold both in built-up form and as a kit to avoid purchase tax, selling for just £25. By 1963 it was estimated that 250,000 engines in the US and 10,000 in Britain had been sold, all for karting.

The first printed mention of the Trobike is June 1960 and the first road test published on Thursday 22 December 1960 in Motor Cycling with Scooter Weekly. The price then quoted was £35 in kit form, although two adverts in 1962 quoted £29. This may account for the fact that it was made for road use with front and rear brakes, and also for off-road use with a rear brake only.

By November 1961, the factory, also producing the Lambretta scooters, had tooled up to produce the Heinkel three-wheeled bubble car, then known as the Trojan Cabin Cruiser. It seems that the Trobike was a limited success, with perhaps only 500–600 being sold over the two-year period – the last confirmed despatch being 6 March 1962. Known frame numbers range from TB501 to TB1148.

The very last machines were sold to a farmer and known as the Sussex Miniscooter. Later still, a variant known as the Lowline Chimp appeared, using a very similar frame and again a Clinton engine.

Originally, machines had black handlebar rubbers but some later models were fitted with buff-coloured rubbers. The twist grip on early machines (as appear on factory literature) was manufactured by Amal with the cable entering parallel to the handlebars. Later bikes had the more typical Amal twist grip with the cable entering from below.

Later models were fitted with a bashplate between the lower frame downtubes (by frame number TB879). The bashplate was dual purpose: to stop dirt entering the air filter, and also to protect the carburettor from damage. Even later models (by frame number TB1029) were fitted with a further small light steel plate shielding the carburettor float bowl and fitted under the heads of the front two engine mounting bolts.

=== Specification ===
- Manufacturer: Trojan Ltd, Purley Way, Croydon, Surrey
- Model: Trobike
- Wheels: Trojan pressed steel 5-inch (130 mm) split rim with tapered roller bearings
- Tyres: Front 3.00 x 5 Dunlop, Rear 3.50 x 5 Dunlop
- Tyre pressures: 20 pounds per square inch
- Accelerator and Brake linkage: Enclosed cable
- Brakes: two 5-inch (130 mm) drums
- Chassis: 7/8-inch (22 mm) tubular steel, duplex
- Colour: White frame, red mudguards, black seat, yellow engine
- Chain: 3/8-inch (9.5 mm) pitch x 7/32 inch (5.6 mm) wide. 105 links
- Engine sprocket: 12 tooth
- Rear sprocket: 64 tooth
- Starter: Recoil
- Cut-out switch: Push button
- Engine: Clinton A490 Panther 2-stroke (de-governed for Trobike application)
- Lubrication: Petroil, 16:1 ratio
- Cylinder size: Bore 2 1/8 inches (54 mm), Stroke 1 5/8 inches (41 mm)
- Capacity: 95 cc
- Fuel tank: All-welded 3/8 imp gal (1.7 L; 0.45 US gal) tank mounted on engine
- Transmission: Single speed via Clinton centrifugal clutch
- Electrical: Flywheel magneto
- Suspension: None

Dimensions and weight

- Overall length: 48 in (1,219 mm)
- Width over handlebars: 21 in (533 mm)
- Wheelbase: 37 in (940 mm)
- Height over top of handlebars: 28.5 in (724 mm)
- Seat height: 23 in (584 mm)
- Weight: 60 lb (27 kg)

Performance

- Power: 2.5 bhp at 3800 R.P.M.
- Max speed: 32 mph (51 km/h)
- 0–30 mph: 21 seconds
- Braking distance: 28 ft (8.5 m) @ 30 mph (48 km/h)

Frame The frame is manufactured from steel tube which is electrically welded to resist shock and impact. The steering head is mounted on ball bearings. The front mudguard and the integral rear chain and mudguard are built of resin reinforced glass fibre and finished in red to contrast with the white enamel finish of the frame assembly.

Engine The Clinton A490 Panther 2-stroke engine is centrally mounted. The engine position is adjustable to suit chain tension. The starting is by recoil starter, power being delivered to the rear wheel through an automatic centrifugal clutch which comes into effect upon opening of the throttle.

Models Two models – the Garden Model and Road Model – are basically similar, with the difference that the Garden Model does not include number plates, front wheel brake and brake lever, hooter or tax disc. Trobikes have an eye-catching colour scheme – white frames, forks, handlebars, and wheels – yellow engines – red chain/mudguards. A foam rubber saddle covered with black plastic leather cloth is fitted to each machine.

Wheels Wheels are made from pressed steel and are of the split rim type for easy tyre removal. Both front and rear wheels run on opposed high-grade taper roller bearings on an alloy steel spindle, which is designed for easy wheel removal. Car-type internal expanding brakes are used.

== See also ==
- Trojan-Tauranac Racing
- List of car manufacturers of the United Kingdom
