= Maico =

Former car manufacturer

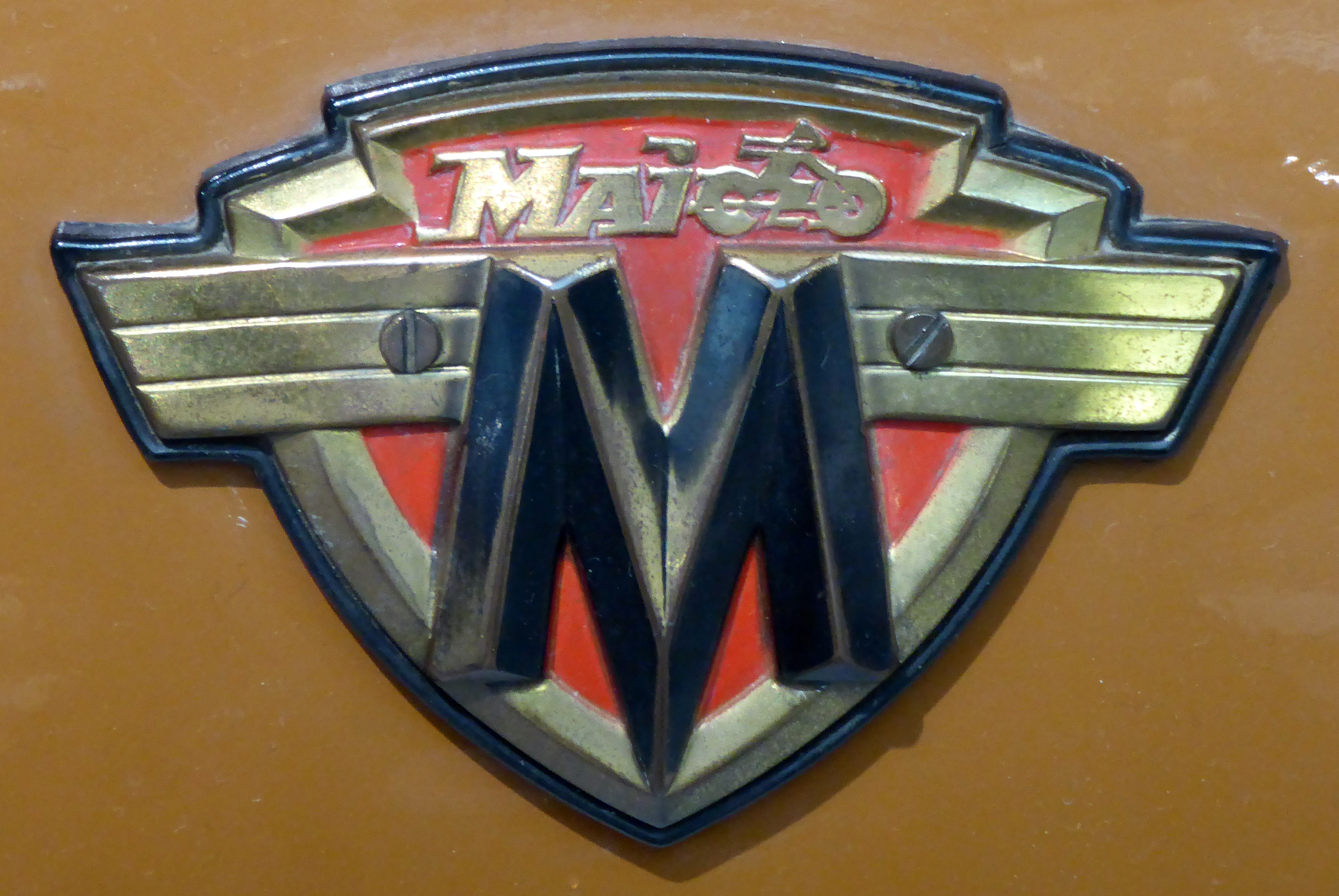
- Founded: 1926; 100 years ago
- Founder: Ulrich Maisch
- Headquarters: Pfäffingen, Germany
- Products: motorcycles automobiles (formerly)

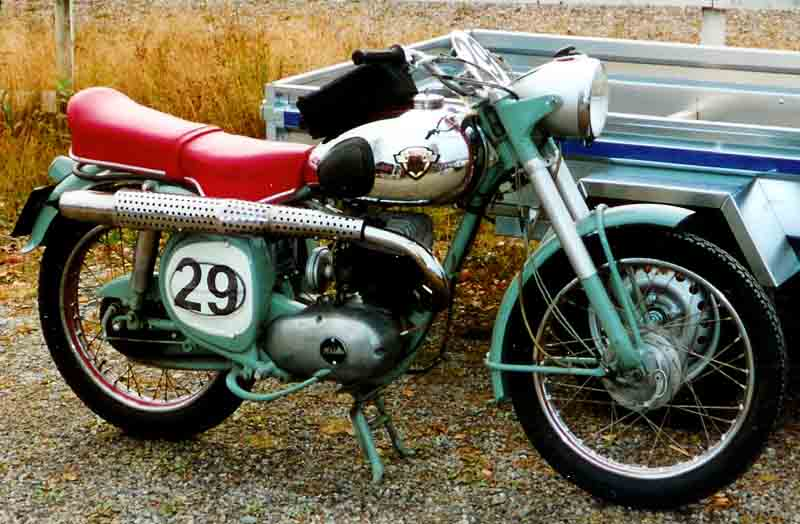
1956 Maico 250cc

Maicowerk A.G., known by its trading name Maico (pronounced [ˈmaɪko]) is the name of a family company in the Swabian town of Pfäffingen near Tübingen. Founded in 1926 by Ulrich Maisch as Maisch & Co, the company originally manufactured 98 and 123 cc Ilo two-stroke engines. After World War II, they began producing their own unit construction two-stroke engines, selling complete motorcycles. Maico made a brief foray into the automobile business with their own line of microcars in the late 1950s. Maico have also made go kart engines.

The road motorcycles were named after winds... "Blizzard", "Typhoon" etc., but the company was better known for its purpose-built motocross and enduro machines, and for its 'Maicoletta' motor scooters, all of which sold in higher numbers than the road motorcycles.

== Maico racing motorcycles ==
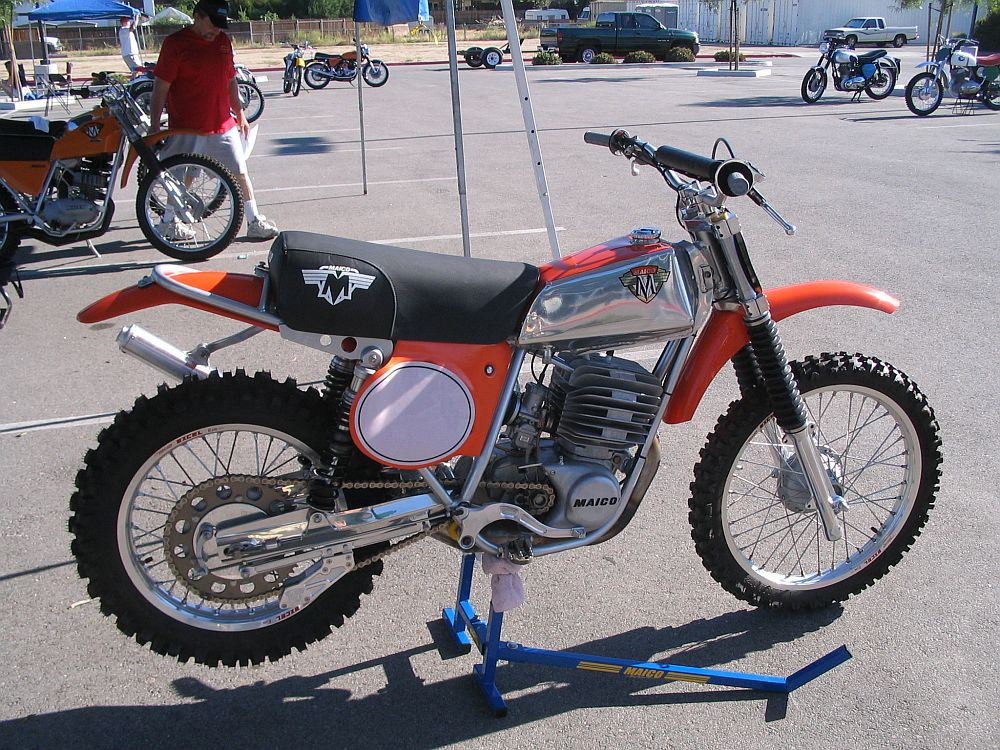
1974 Maico 400 GP

Maico motocross (MC) and enduro (GS) racing models proved very successful in both European and American competition throughout the 1970s. While lacking the financial capital and big money race-team backing like that of the Japanese factories of Honda, Yamaha, Suzuki, and Kawasaki, Maico riders such as Adolf Weil, Åke Jonsson and Willy Bauer proved to be serious challenges to the Japanese factories and produced numerous top-three finishes in the Motocross World Championships. The firm also experienced some success in Grand Prix road racing competitions with rider Börje Jansson winning three 125cc Grand Prix races between 1972 and 1973.

American publication Motocross Action called the 1981 Maico Mega 2 – 490cc the greatest open-class motocross bike of all time.

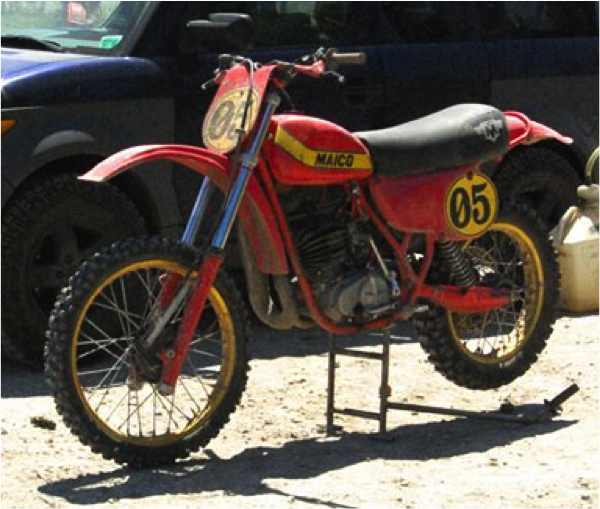
1979 Maico 250 Magnum

One of the largest contributions to the world of motocross suspension technology came in the 1974 season when the Wheelsmith Motorcycles team in the US and the Gunther Schier teams in Europe forward-mounted the rear shocks on the Maico factory-backed motorcycles, immediately increasing the travel and ability to best the competition. This initiated a frantic effort on the part of factory teams and privateers alike; chopping up their frames in a desperate attempt to remain competitive.

Maicowerk AG filed for bankruptcy in 1983, but continued to produce small numbers of motocross and enduro models (re-badged as M-Stars in the United States due to legal issues) through 1986. Subsequent manufacturers have purchased the brand name and applied it to their own limited production motorcycles. Modern open-class dirt-bikes are still being produced under the Maico brandname. The ATK Intimidator dirt-bike (reportedly the most powerful production two-stroke motorcycle available aside from Maico's own motorcycles) features a Maico motor.

After the company went out of business in 1986, it was sold to Lorenz Merkle who manufactured the bikes under the Maico name until the mid-1990s. The plastics for Maico went from Red to Blue during this time but this was not Merkle's doing. In 1986, when Maico sent the new bikes to the UK, Bill Brown the distributor was impressed with the bikes but disappointed that they looked the same as the previous year. So he ordered them naked and bought blue plastics for them.

Several changes to the motorcycles occurred during these years. In 1992–93, the 500 became a true 500 cc instead of a 490 when the location of the connecting rod was moved on the crank to increase the stroke and raise the ccs. The other change was a new shifting cam mechanism.

In the mid-1990s, Merkle went to sell the company, as he was not able to maintain it based on the rate of income. Several companies were looking to purchase the brand including one from Indonesia, as well as Ronnie Smith of U.S. Maico in America. Eventually, one attempt to buy the company turned out to be a scam. Eventually, it went to Dutch company Rodem. Rodem was producing Maicos from 1995 through 1997 when it went bankrupt and its largest shareholder, Brouwer, took control.

No Maicos were released for the first time in 1998. The famous two-stroke tuner and sidecar engine builder Hermann Walgenbach completely retuned the Maico and in 1999 there was a new bike released that also now included a hydraulic clutch. Brouwer decided to stop selling Maicos and Koestler in Germany picked up production and still produces Maicos to this day. In 2003, he was sponsoring a supermoto team and they needed more power so he had the Maico 620 and Maico 685 built.

Maico to this day retains a strong cult following. Many riders restore vintage Maicos for display or to take back to the track.

== Maicoletta ==
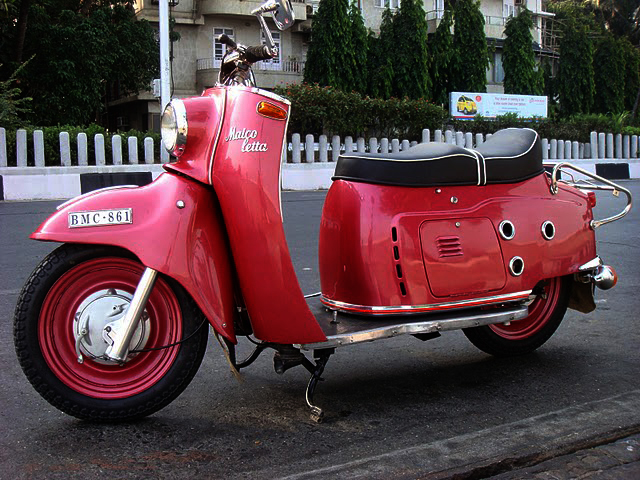
Maicoletta scooter

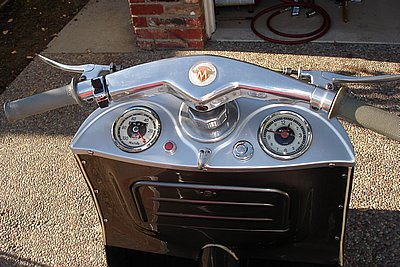
Maicoletta Dash

The Maicoletta motor scooter of the 1950s was one of the largest motor scooters produced by any manufacturer until the modern era. The engine was a single cylinder 247cc piston-port two-stroke (an export version featuring a 277cc engine was also produced for use with a sidecar), with four foot-operated gears, enclosed chain drive, centrifugal fan cooling and electric start. This was fitted to a tubular frame built on motorcycle principles with long travel telescopic forks and 14-inch wheels. The Maicoletta had a top speed of greater than 70 mph, comparable with most 250cc motorcycles of the time. In the 1950s most scooters such as Vespa, Lambretta, were 125cc to 200cc with 8–10 inch wheels and a top speed of 55 to 60 mph, so the expensive but fast and comfortable Maicoletta developed a following amongst scooter club enthusiasts.

By modern standards the brakes (drum front and rear) leave something to be desired, but compared to those of other scooters from the period, the brakes are not inferior.

== Pendulum starter ==
An unusual Bosch six-volt "pendulum" electric starter system was fitted, which was quite advanced for the 1950s, and about which there are a number of common misconceptions. When activated, instead of rotating the crankshaft the starter used the generator coils on the shaft to rock it back and forth under the control of cams on the crankshaft. These cams closed contacts in the generator to trigger a reversing switch in the "control box" that changed the crankshaft direction at the end of each swing. This gives the impression of the crankshaft continually bouncing back and forwards against compression, when operated. A separate set of ignition points fired the spark plug in the forward direction only, and when this fires the mixture in the cylinder the engine starts to rotate normally, the starter was released and the normal ignition system took over. The advantage of this system is that the starter does not have to force the crankshaft to turn over against compression, so less power is required from the six volt system. Its disadvantage is the unusual number of contacts, which can be difficult to adjust. The reversing switch contacts tend to wear out with extended use and can be very difficult to get repaired, hence the scooter's reputation for requiring roll starts later in life.

== Maico Mobil ==
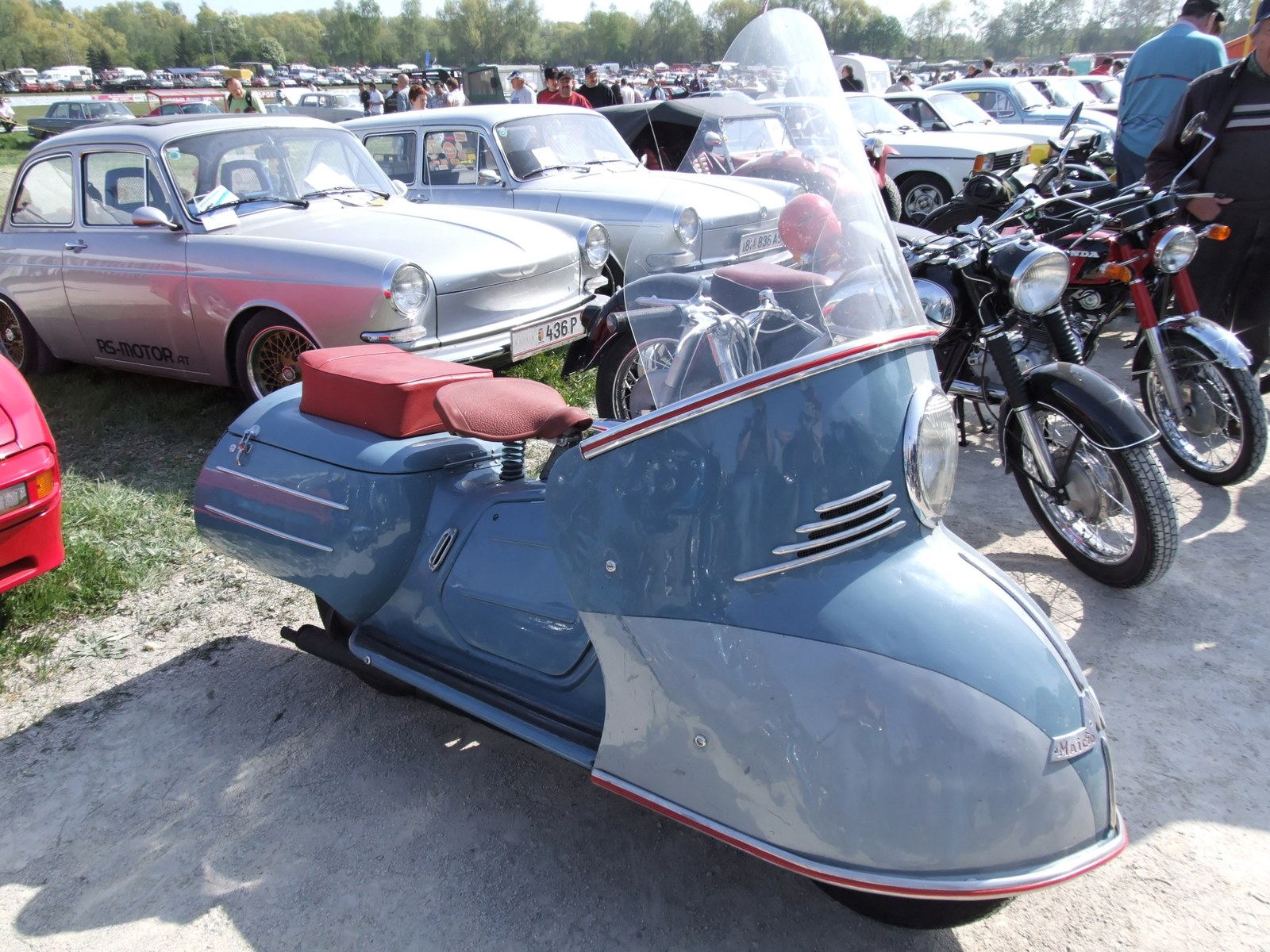
Maicomobil

The Maico Mobil, said to resemble a "two-wheeled car", was a highly enclosed two-wheel motorcycle which sold only in small numbers. It was designed to provide motorcycle handling combined with scooter convenience, a large trunk, and weather protection. It was nicknamed the "dustbin". The Mobil was produced from June 1950 through 1958 with aluminum bodywork and a tubular frame.

== Microcars ==
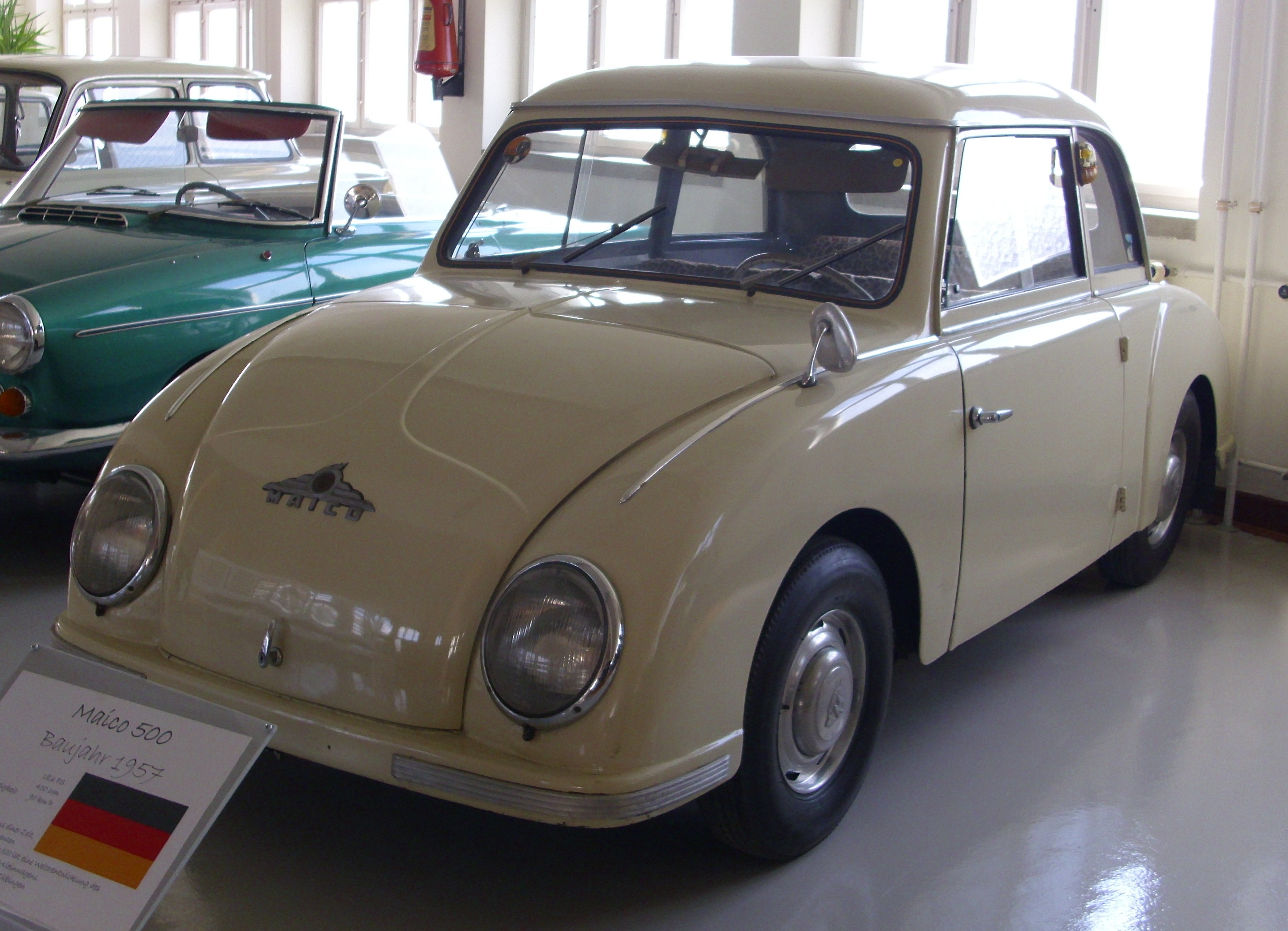
Maico MC 500/4 of 1957

Maico also produced microcars from 1956 to 1958.
