= List of Ariel motorcycles =

This is a list of Ariel Motorcycles.

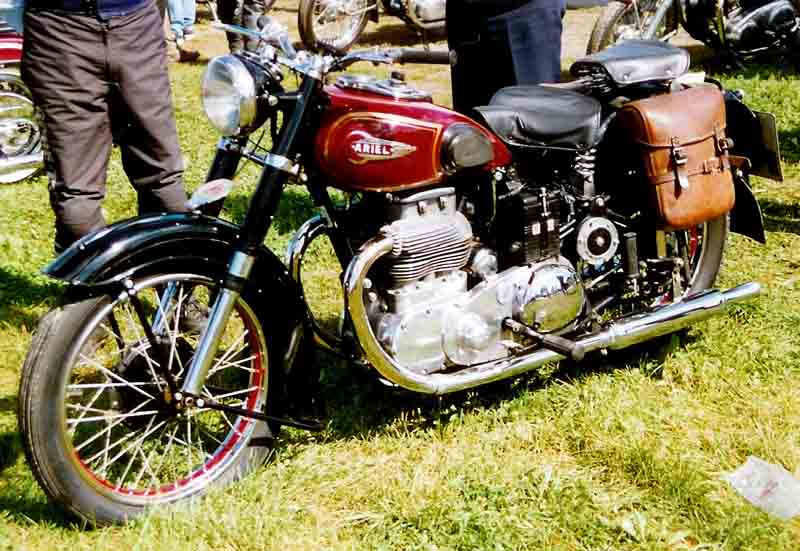
Ariel Square Four Mk1

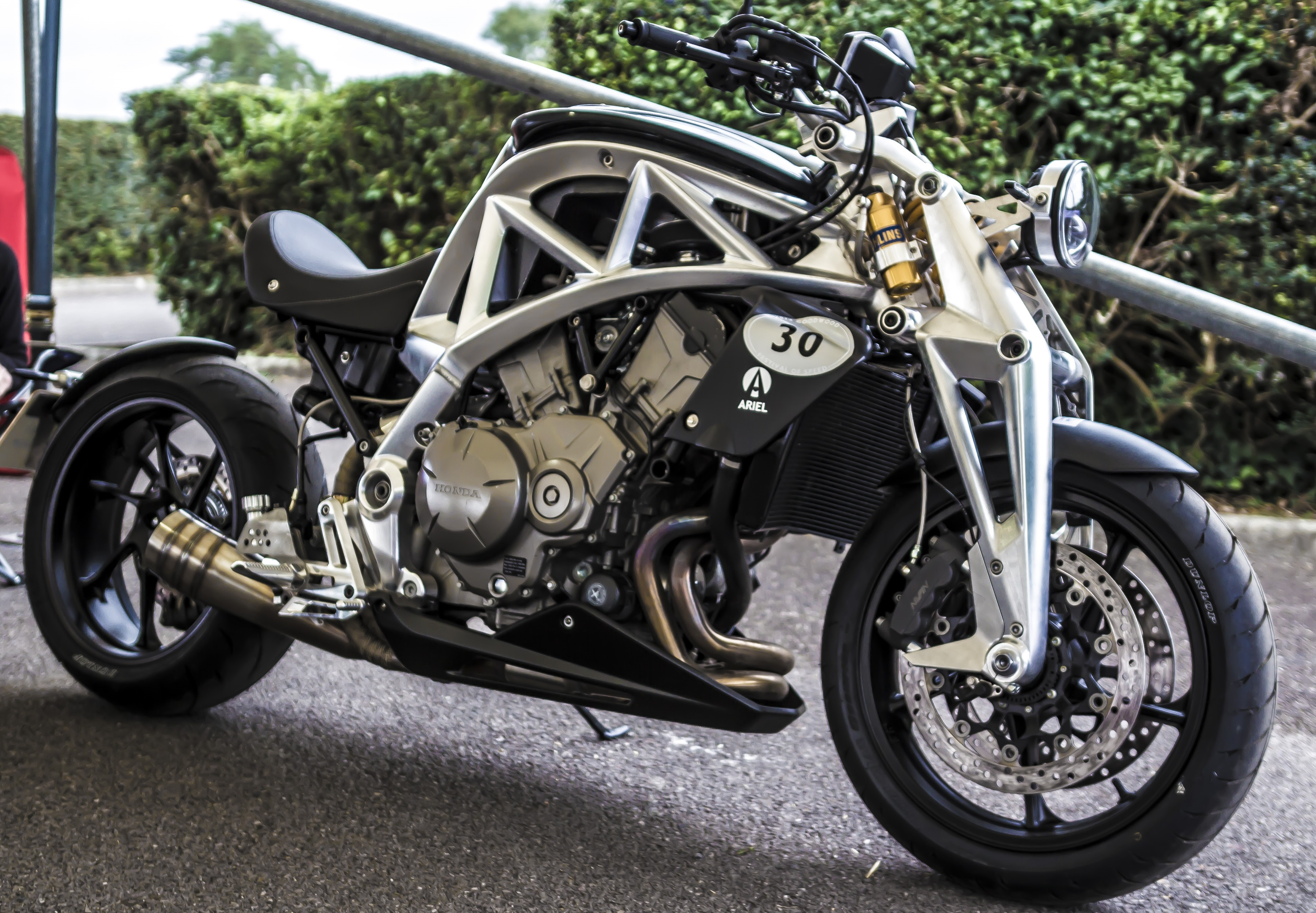
Ariel Ace

| Model | Year | Notes |
|---|---|---|
| Ariel | | 325 cc |
| Ariel 3.5 hp | 1913 | 499 cc, single-cylinder side-valve four-stroke |
| Ariel V-twin | 1915 | 700 cc |
| Ariel 4 hp | 1918 | White and Poppe engine |
| Ariel Model D 500 cc | 1926 | Four-stroke OHV single |
| Ariel VB | 1926–59 | 598 cc side-valve single |
| Ariel 557 cc | 1926–35 | Side-valve single variously designated A, B, SB, VA or VB |
| Ariel LB | 1929–32 | 250 cc side-valve |
| Ariel LF & LG | 1929–32 | 250 cc OHV "Colt" |
| Ariel 4F | 1931–37 | early square four first year 501 cc by 1932 it became a 600 cc Over head camshaft engine known as a cammy four. |
| Ariel SF31 | 1931–33 | 500 cc sloper engine |
| Ariel MF & MH | 1931–33 | 350 cc sloper engine |
| Ariel 4F | 1931–40 | "Square" four-cylinder engine in 500 cc (1931–32) & 600 cc (1932–40) versions |
| Ariel VH | 1932–59 | 500 cc OHV Red Hunter |
| Ariel NG | 1935–40 | 350 cc OHV |
| Ariel NH | 1932–59 | 350 cc OHV Red Hunter |
| Ariel LH & OH | 1934–40 | 250 cc OHV Red Hunter |
| Ariel LF, LG, & OG | 1934–40 | 250 cc OHV "Colt" |
| Ariel 4G & 4H | 1937–40 | "Square" four-cylinder 995 cc |
| Ariel VA | 1940 | 500 C.C. Side Valve four stroke |
| Ariel W/NG | 1940–45 | 350 cc (Military) |
| Ariel KG & KH | 1948 | 500 cc parallel twin, later versions called the "Fieldmaster" |
| Ariel VB | 1947–58 | 598 cc side-valve single, later models had alloy head |
| Ariel Square Four Mark I | 1949–53 | "Square" four-cylinder 995 cc |
| Ariel VCH | 1949–53 | 500 cc all alloy engine competition bike, shorten frame with high ground clearance. |
| Ariel KHA | 1953 only | all alloy engine version |
| Ariel VHA | 1952–53 | 500 cc alloy barrel and head |
| Ariel Square Four Mark II | 1953–58 | "Square" four-cylinder 995 cc |
| Ariel HS | 1954–58 | "HS" hunter scrambler all alloy engine 500 cc high performance competition bike 34bhp |
| Ariel FH | 1954 | 650 cc parallel twin called the "Huntmaster" with BSA A10 engine |
| Ariel 350 cc HT3 | 1954 | Trials special with competition frame |
| Ariel 500 cc HT | 1954–59 | Trials special with competition frame |
| Ariel LH | 1954–58 | 200 cc OHV Ariel Colt |
| Ariel Leader | 1958–65 | 250 cc two-stroke |
| Ariel Arrow | 1959 | 250 cc sports version of Ariel Leader |
| Ariel Golden Arrow | 1963 | 250 cc |
| Ariel Arrow | 1967 | 200 cc reduced capacity to place it in lower road tax bracket |
| Ariel Pixie | 1968 | 50 cc version of BSA Beagle engine |
| Ariel 3 | 1969 | Three-wheeler with Anker (Dutch) 50 cc engine |
| Ariel Ace | 2014 | Ariel marque's first new motorcycle in more than 50 years and it uses the 1200 cc V4 engine from the Honda VFR1200. |

== See also ==
- List of AMC motorcycles
- List of BSA motorcycles
- List of Douglas motorcycles
- List of Triumph motorcycles
- List of Royal Enfield motorcycles
- List of Velocette motorcycles
- List of Vincent motorcycles
