= Triumph 6/1 =

British motorcycle

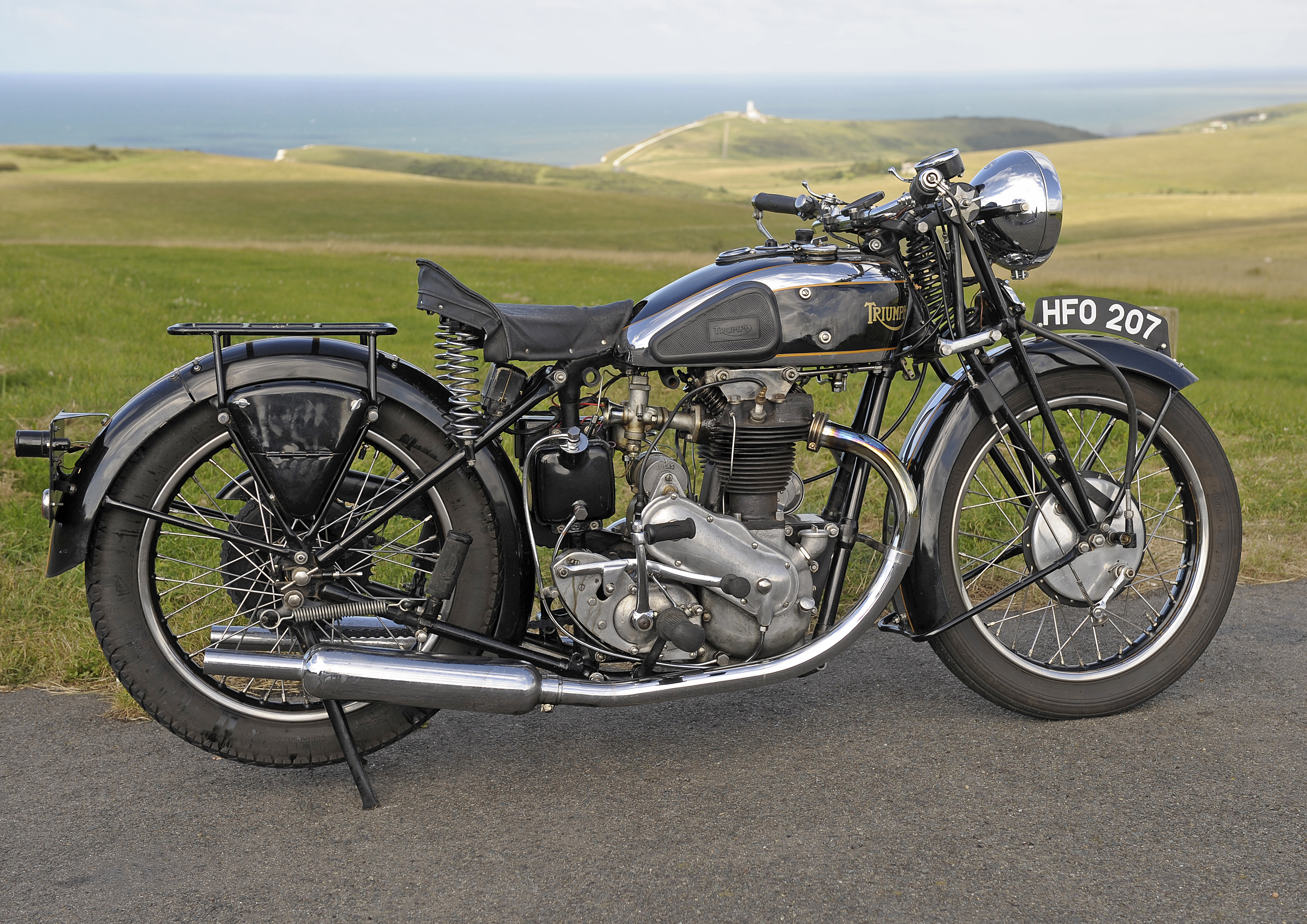
- Triumph 6/1
- Manufacturer: Triumph Motor Company
- Production: 1933-1935
- Assembly: Coventry, UK
- Successor: Triumph Thunderbird
- Class: Heavyweight standard
- Engine: 649 cc (39.6 cu in) OHV parallel-twin
- Bore / stroke: 70 mm × 84 mm (2.8 in × 3.3 in)
- Top speed: est. 85 mph (137 km/h)
- Power: 25 bhp at 4,500 rpm
- Transmission: Four-speed manual; hand-shift (foot-shift available in 1935)
- Frame type: Tubular steel dual downtube
- Suspension: Girder fork, rigid rear
- Brakes: Linked 8 in (203 mm) drum brakes front and rear
- Oil capacity: 7 imp pt (4.0 L)

The Triumph 6/1 is a motorcycle that was made by Triumph at their Coventry factory from 1934 to 1936. Designed by Val Page, the 6/1 was the first Triumph motorcycle to use a parallel-twin engine. A sidecar-equipped 6/1 won a silver medal in the 1933 International Six Days Trial and went on to win the Maudes Trophy for 1933. The 6/1 was a commercial failure, selling fewer than 600 in two years on the market.

== Background ==
In conducting experiments with a single bank of Edward Turner's square four-engine design, Turner and his supervisor, Ariel chief engineer Val Page both saw potential in the straight-twin as a motorcycle engine. From the experiments, it was shown that a 360° crank angle was better suited to the use of a single carburettor than a 180° crank angle.

Page left Ariel in 1932 to become the chief motorcycle engineer at the Triumph Motor Company. Page replaced all but one of Triumph's existing line of single-cylinder motorcycles with his designs.

== Design and specifications ==
In addition to redesigning Triumph's line of single-cylinder motorcycles, Page also designed a new twin-cylinder motorcycle. The 6/1 was the first Triumph motorcycle with a parallel-twin engine to enter production.

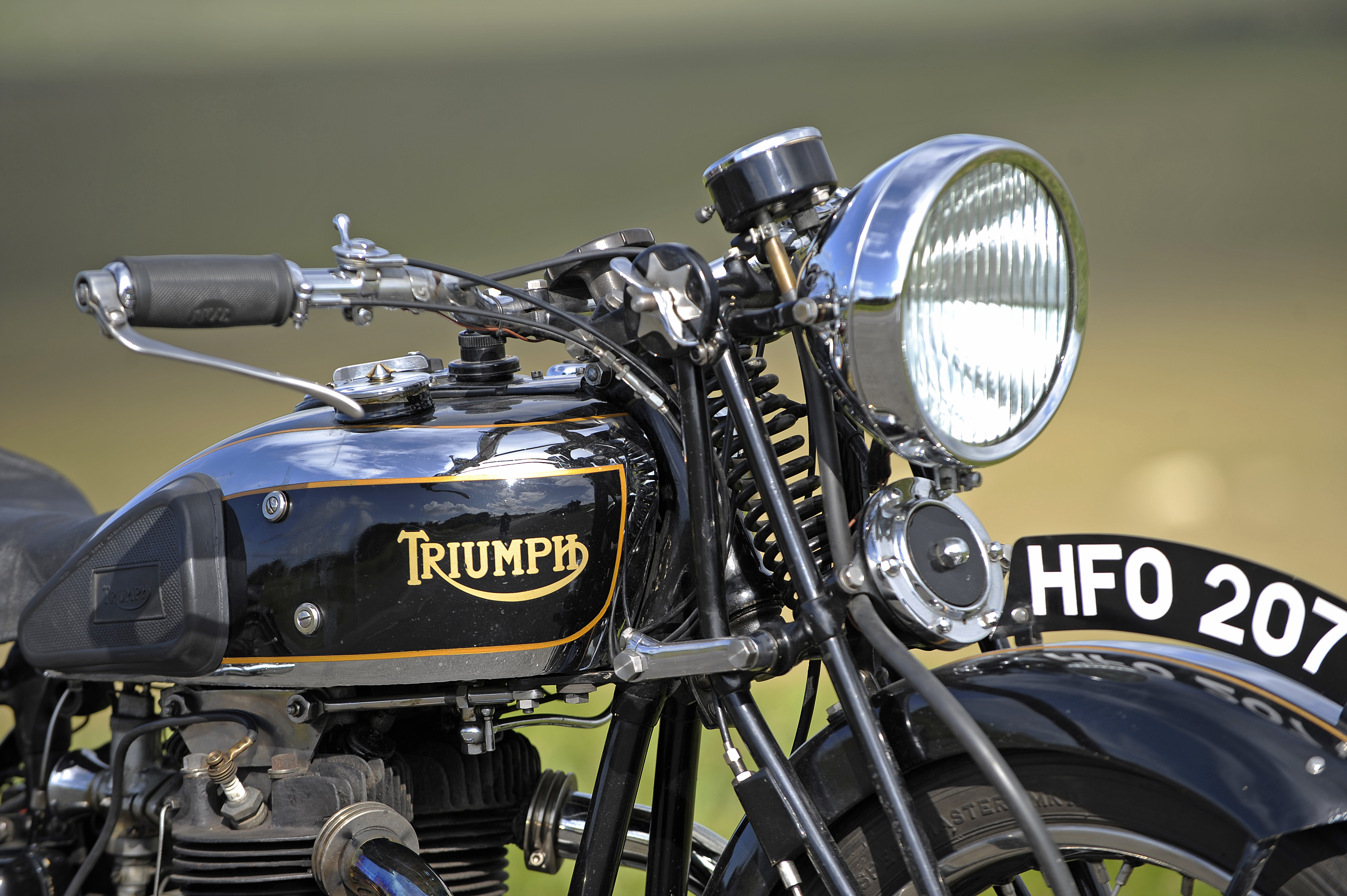
Closeup of tank, handlebars and front suspension

The 6/1 was designed primarily for use as a sidecar hauler, mainly as a smaller, more economical alternative to the one litre V-Twins and fours usually used to pull sidecars at the time. As such, strength and durability were given priority, resulting in a large motorcycle weighing 412 pounds (187 kg).

The engine was a 649 cc 360° parallel-twin with a 74 mm bore and an 80 mm stroke. (Note: A two-cylinder engine with a 74 mm bore and an 80 mm stroke should displace 688 cc) The cylinder barrels and individual heads for each cylinder were made from cast iron. The crankcase was split vertically and held an oil tank with a capacity of 7 imperial pints (4.0 L). Unlike Page's single cylinder designs for Triumph, which had double-plunger oil pumps and were the first Triumph motorcycles with enclosed valve gear, the 6/1 had a single-plunger oil pump and exposed valve gear with double-coil valve springs and rocker shaft with grease nipples. Induction was through a single 1" Amal Type 276 carburettor on a Y-shaped manifold The flywheel was positioned outside the left case, and the camshaft was positioned behind the cylinder bank. The engine was positioned offset to the right in the frame.

The four-speed gearbox was bolted to the back of the engine crankcase and was powered by double-helical gears, and a nine-plate clutch. The engine ran "backward", or counter to the rear wheel. Shifting was initially by hand, but was changed to a foot-shift system in 1935. The engine oil filter was mounted behind the gearbox.

The 6/1 had 8 in (200 mm) drum brakes front and rear. The brakes were linked, and the rear wheel had a ratcheted "parking brake".

== Achievements and awards ==
Harry Perry, Triumph's sales manager, entered a Triumph 6/1 attached to a Triumph Gloria sidecar in the 1933 International Six Days Trial. Time lost repairing a front tyre cost him a gold medal; Perry returned to England with a silver medal in the sidecar class. The combination was then taken to Brooklands and, under the supervision of the Auto Cycle Union (ACU), was ridden 500 miles (805 km) in 498 minutes. This test won Triumph the 1933 Maudes Trophy.

== Reception ==
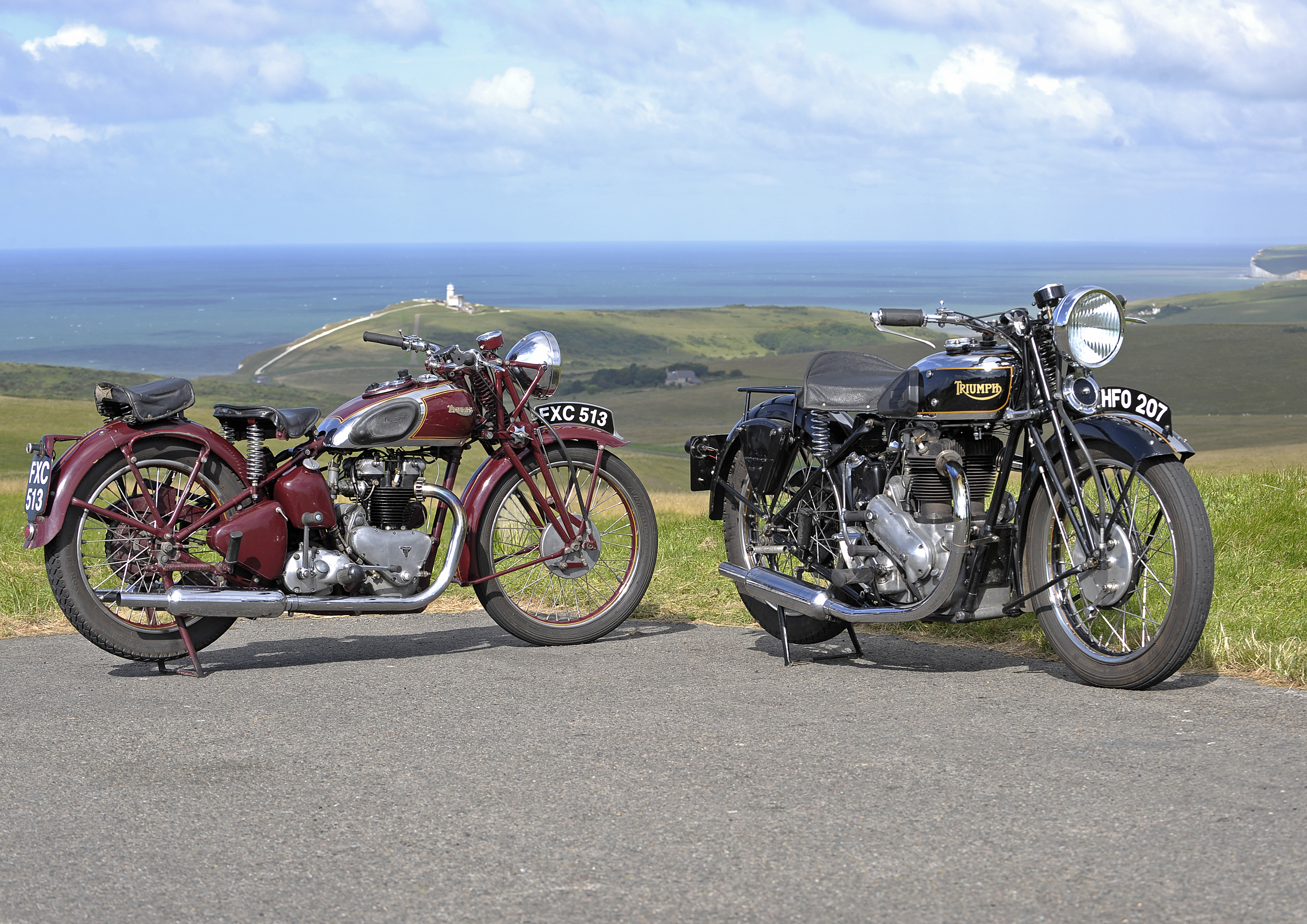
Speed Twin and 6/1

At £76, the 6/1 was Triumph's most expensive motorcycle in 1934. It was expensive to produce and, with no parts interchangeable with any other Triumph motorcycle, there was no way to spread the costs out. The heavyweight motorcycle/sidecar market for which the 6/1 had been developed was giving way to light motor cars like the Austin Seven, the Morris Eight, and Triumph's own Super 9. As a result, the 6/1 was a commercial failure and was discontinued in 1935. Estimates of the total number built vary between 100 and 600.

== Legacy ==
Despite its achievements and awards, and despite being the first parallel-twin motorcycle from a manufacturer well known for parallel-twin motorcycles, the 6/1 is little remembered, having been overshadowed by Edward Turner's later and more successful Triumph Speed Twin.

== See also ==
- List of Triumph motorcycles
