= Perrigo (disambiguation) =

Perrigo can refer to:

- Perrigo, manufacturer of private label over-the-counter pharmaceuticals in the United States

Perrigo (surname)

- Bert Perrigo (1903 - 1985), British engineer who was a successful motorcycle trials rider before becoming Competition Manager for BSA ...
- Harry Perrigo
- Oscar E. Perrigo (1848 - 1923), American mechanical engineer, and early management author.
