= Maudes Trophy =

Motorcycle award

The Maudes Trophy is a motorcycle award established in 1923 by George Pettyt, owner of Maudes Motor Mart, based in Great Portland Street, London, who promoted an impartially-observed endurance test for motorcycles and provided a challenge award to the ACU who participated by acting as the body responsible for providing observers. Pettyt donated a silver trophy for the Auto-Cycle Union (ACU) to award annually, although over the years attempts proved to be infrequent.

The last award came in December 2023, when electric motorcycle manufacturer Zero Motorcycles successfully took a pair of DSR/X machines on a 60 hour, 1200 mile, ride starting in Lands End and taking in Lowestoft, Edinburgh and Holyhead, before ending at the FIM Awards ceremony in the city of Liverpool.

== Winners ==
| Year | Winner | Motorcycle(s) used | Notes |
|---|---|---|---|
| 1923 | Norton | 500 cc, solo | Averaged 64 mph for 12 hours at Brooklands. |
| 1924 | Norton | Big Four with sidecar | Ridden 4,060 miles from Land's End, Cornwall, England to John O'Groats, Highland, Scotland, and back in 18 days. |
| 1925 | Norton | | |
| 1926 | BSA | | Demonstration of sixty climbs of Bwlch y Groes |
| 1927 | Ariel | 557 cc Model B with sidecar | Ridden for 5,011 miles without stopping the engine. |
| 1928 | Ariel | 250 cc overhead-valve 500 cc overhead-valve | 10,000 mile endurance test over a 120-mile open road course. |
| 1930 | Dunelt | 498 cc ohv engine | 13,119 miles endurance test over 16 days in the Isle of Man. |
| 1931 | Ariel | Seven motorcycles: 1. MB.32 (350 cc side-valve); 2. M.2F.32 (350 cc overhead-valve 2-port); 3. VB.32 (550 cc side-valve); 4. VG.32 (500 cc 4-valve overhead-valve); 5. SB.32 (550 cc side—valve "Sloper"); 6. SG.32 (500 cc 2-valve overhead-valve "Sloper") with sidecar 7. 4F:6.32 Square Four | Seven tests, one for each motorcycle: 1. Seven-hour endurance run at Brooklands: 368 miles covered.; 2. Consumption test: approx. 700 miles on seven shillings worth of petrol and oil 3. Head decarbonised in 4 min 19 s using only spanners from the motorcycle's tool kit (target time: under 7 min); 4. One-hour speed run at Brooklands: more than 80 miles covered. (target distance: 70 miles); 5. Run for 70 minutes in each of four gears on ordinary roads 6. Seven non-stop ascents and descents of each of seven famous test hills: Porlock, Lynton, Beggar's Roost, Countisbury, Bwlch y Groes, Dinas Hill, and Alt y Bady; 7. 700 miles in less than 670 minutes (target time: 700 minutes) |
| 1933 | Triumph | 6/1 motorcycle with Gloria sidecar | Covered 500 miles in 498 minutes at Brooklands. (The combination had earlier won a silver medal at that year's ISDT) |
| 1934 | Phelon & Moore | 250 cc Red Panther | Performance in Land's End Run: average speed greater than 35 mph (56 km/h), fuel efficiency of 115.7 mpg_{‑imp} (2.44 L/100 km; 96.3 mpg_{‑US}), "hands-off" stability at and over 50 mph (80 km/h) |
| 1937 | Triumph | Tiger 70; Tiger 80; Tiger 90 | Machines chosen by ACU at random from Triumph dealers. Three hour high speed run at Donington Park followed by timed lap around Brooklands: Tiger 70: 66.39 mph (106.84 km/h); Tiger 80: 74.68 mph (120.19 km/h); Tiger 90: 82.31 mph (132.47 km/h) |
| 1938 | BSA | M21 Combination; M23 Empire Star. | Endurance test: 20 climbs of Bwlch y Groes; Acceleration, speed, and braking tests at Brooklands; 20 more climbs of Bwlch y Groes; Crossing London in traffic, north–south and east–west, in top gear |
| 1939 | Triumph | Speed Twin; Tiger 100 | Bikes chosen by ACU observers from Triumph dealers at random. Bikes ridden from John O'Groats to Land's End, and then across to the Brooklands circuit, a total of 1800 miles, followed by a 6 hour high speed run at Brooklands. |
| 1952 | BSA | 500 cc Star Twin, | Three motorcycles were randomly selected from the production line and ridden to Austria to compete in the 1952 International Six Days Trial. All three bikes won Gold medals in the competition. The bikes were then ridden through Germany and Denmark to Oslo, where flying quarter-mile tests gave average speeds greater than 80 mph (130 km/h). The bikes were then ridden back to the UK, covering a total of 4,958 miles. |
| 1962 | Honda | Super Cub | Three standard production Honda 50cc motorcycles (a C100, a C102 and a C110) with a team of 20 riders covered more than 15,800 miles at Goodwood in a week long day and night continuous test. Honda received the first manufacturer's award in a decade and held the trophy for 11 years. |
| 1973 | BMW | R75/5 | Two motorcycles ran continuously over the Isle of Man TT circuit for a whole week, day and night, between 3–10 May 1973. |
| 1974 | Suzuki | GT380; GT550; GT750 | Ridden three times around the coastline of Britain. |
| 1994 | Yamaha | FZR600 | 10 New Zealand riders average over 100 mph on standard bikes chosen at random from the UK warehouse in the Supersport 600 TT. |
| 2023 | Zero Motorcycles | DSR/X | Two electric motorcycles ridden between four points in UK in 60 hours. |
