= Ariel W/NG 350 =

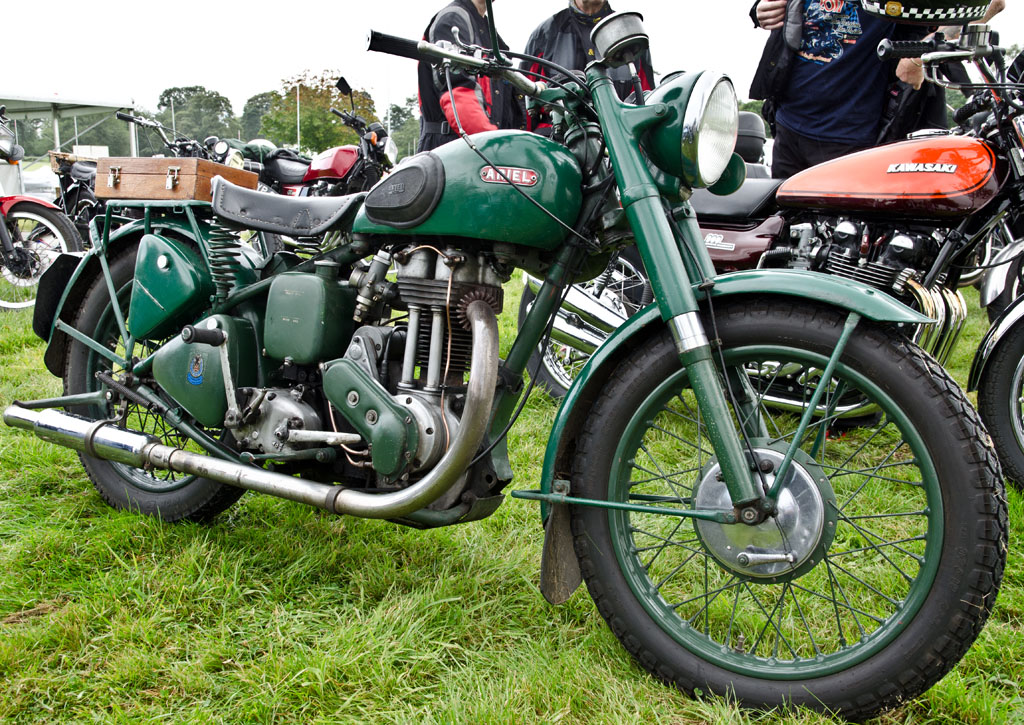
- Manufacturer: Ariel Motorcycles
- Production: 1940–44
- Predecessor: Ariel Red Hunter
- Engine: 346 cc (21.1 cu in), OHV two-valve air-cooled single
- Bore / stroke: 72 mm × 85 mm (2.8 in × 3.3 in)
- Power: 17 bhp at 5,800 rpm
- Transmission: Four-speed gearbox to chain final drive
- Suspension: Girder front forks, solid rear
- Brakes: drum brakes
- Dimensions: L: 2.13 m (84 inches); W: 0.76 m (30 inches); H: 1.06 m (42 inches)
- Weight: 169 kg (373 lb) (dry)
- Fuel capacity: 2.625 imp gal (3.152 U.S. gal; 11.93 L)

The Ariel W/NG 350 is a motorcycle based on the well-proven Ariel Red Hunter singles built by Ariel Motorcycles for the British military, and designed by the firm's chief designer Val Page in 1932 around an engine he had developed six years earlier. Although the Ariel was not initially selected by the War Department, they were in great demand after the evacuation of Dunkirk when much of the British Army's materiel had been left behind.

== Development ==
On the outbreak of the Second World War, Ariel submitted the 1939 VA 497 cc (30.3 cu in) overhead valve single for evaluation against the War Office's Norton 16H. The 1939 W/VA 497cc side-valve single was also tested. Both performed well and Ariel developed the W/NG specifically for military use. This was a 348 cc (21.2 cu in) OHV single based on a Scottish six-day Trials winning model and went into production in 1940.

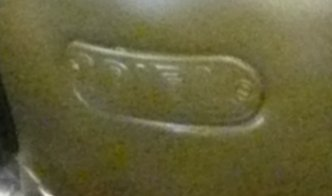

Although the French military immediately placed orders for the W/NG, the British War Office rated it as "fair – for use only in emergency purposes". Following the loss of equipment resulting from the evacuation of Dunkirk in May 1940 the "emergency purposes" became necessary, and Ariel turned over as many motorcycles as possible to the war effort, including converted civilian machines – many of which still carried an Ariel badge painted over with green or sand paint. VH & VG (500 OHV singles), NH & NG (350 OHV singles), and even the VB (598 cc or 36.5 cu in SV single) models were put into military service, although most were used for training and civil defence. The British Army, Royal Air Force, Admiralty, Ministry of Agriculture and Women's Land Army all used Ariel W/NG 350s.

== Production ==
W/NG 350 cc (21.4 cu in) motorcycles were supplied from 1940 to 1945 and featured dual triangular tool boxes, pannier frames for bags, rear carrying racks and headlamp masks. Rubber items were impossible to source from 1942 because of a shortage of rubber, therefore handgrips were made from canvas and footrests from steel. As the war progressed, aluminium also became scarce and pressed steel was used for the primary chaincase and timing covers.

From an order of 2,000, a few hundreds were delivered in June 1940 to the French Army, many being captured by the Wehrmacht.

Date	Production	Notes
10 July 1940	1	First prototype delivered
8 August 1940	2,700	153 delivered to French military
27 August 1940	350	Chilwell
18 September 1940	2,000	Chilwell
7 March 1941	3,500	Tewkesbury (one fitted with a Matchless engine and one with BSA B30
5 July 1941	3,500	Chilwell
12 August 1941	750	
10 November 1941	300	Delivered at 75 per week
12 December 1941	2,000	Delivered to Tewkesbury at 650 per month
26 December 1941	100	Delivered at 25 per month
2 February 1942	105	27 Delivered to the Royal Navy (estimated production)
14 March 1942	3,500	
9 April 1942	1,800	Delivered to the Royal Air Force
27 August 1942	75	Delivered to the Royal Navy
20 November 1942	40	
21 January 1943	50	Delivered to the Royal Navy
3 March 1943	2,250	
5 May 1943	100	Delivered to the Royal Navy
9 October 1943	250	Delivered to the Royal Navy
20 September 1943	4,000	Contract price £62 each
6 January 1944	3,000	Contract price £62 each
25 March 1944	5	
31 March 1944	2,000	Reduced from original contract for 3,500
16 June 1944	350	Delivered to the Royal Navy
27 January 1945	43	Delivered to the Royal Navy
31 January 1945	249	Delivered to the Royal Navy
15 February 1945	1,122	Delivered to the Royal Air Force (reduced from order for 1,572)
7 April 1945	300	Delivered to the Royal Navy
12 June 1945	300	

== Post war ==
After the war over 800 W/NG motorcycles were supplied to the Danish Army between 1946 and 1947. The remaining W/NGs that survived were mostly converted back into civilian specification for resale by dealers, so good examples of the military model are now rare.

== In popular culture ==
An example attached to a sidecar appears in the film, Nanny McPhee and the Big Bang. The motorcycle, ridden by the title character, also appeared in versions of the advertising poster upon release.

== See also ==
- Matchless G3/L
- List of motorcycles of the 1940s
