= BSA Empire Star =

British single cylinder 4-stroke motorcycle

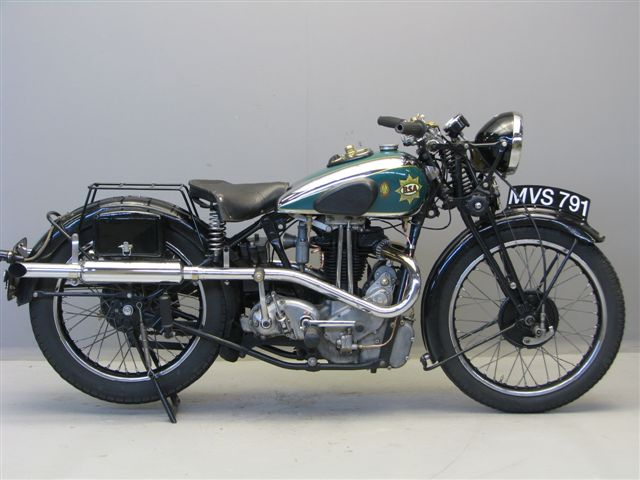
- Manufacturer: BSA
- Production: 1936–1939
- Class: Standard
- Engine: 249 cc (15.2 cu in); 348 cc (21.2 cu in); 496 cc (30.3 cu in) single cylinder 4 stroke
- Bore / stroke: 60 mm × 88 mm (2.4 in × 3.5 in); 71 mm × 88 mm (2.8 in × 3.5 in); 82 mm × 94 mm (3.2 in × 3.7 in)
- Transmission: 4 speed, chain

The Empire Star was a standard motorcycle made by BSA at their factory in Small Heath, Birmingham. Named to commemorate the Silver Jubilee of King George V of the United Kingdom and advertised as The Masterpiece of the Industry, the Empire Star range was produced between 1936 and 1939, when it was developed into the BSA Gold Star and World War II stopped production.

== Development ==
Developed from the popular BSA Blue Star and designed by Val Page, the Empire Star range had the benefit several ideas Page had been developing at his previous employers, Ariel and Triumph motorcycles. With a heavy frame and iron barrelled pushrod valves the Empire Star still had the legacy of the earlier BSAs however, and Page continued to lighten it and introduce engine tuning ideas throughout production.

The overhead valve Empire Star was available as the 250 cubic centimetres (15 cu in) 'B22', the 350 cc (21 cu in) 'R5' and the 500 cc (31 cu in) 'Q8' models. Based on the standard Blue Star the 'Empire' featured an alloy primary chaincase with a special high compression piston and a hardened cylinder bore. It also had some modern features, including a new foot-change gearbox and dry sump lubrication.

BSA launched the range of Empire Star models in 1936 with an effective demonstration of their reliability - a 500 cubic centimetres (31 cu in) model was subjected to an endurance test of 500 miles (800 km) at Brooklands, averaging speeds of over 70 miles per hour (110 km/h) round the oval track. This was followed by a 1,000 miles (1,600 km) endurance ride around the UK, visiting the West Country, Wales and the Lake District. The whole trip was completed successfully without the need for any spare parts - an important selling point for BSA in an increasingly competitive marketplace.

The outbreak of World War II ended production of the Empire Star in 1939 as the BSA factory switched to making munitions and producing the BSA M20 for the British Army.

== Racing success ==
It was the top of the range 496 cubic centimetres (30.3 cu in) Empire Star, which saw most success in competition. In 1937 at Brooklands race track, Isle of Man TT winner Wal Handley won a race with a fastest lap at 107.57 miles per hour (173.12 km/h) on a specially modified 500 cc Empire Star. The motorcycle used by Handley had a special racing carburettor, a new design of magneto and close ratio gearing. Handley had been persuaded out of 'retirement' especially for the three-lap race, which meant 8 miles (13 km) at top speed on the uneven and deteriorating banked oval track. It took skill and experience to win, and Handley was awarded one of the traditional Gold Star badges. This inspired BSA to develop the BSA Gold Star.

Also in 1937 BSA competition team rider Bert Perrigo won both the Colmore Cup and Victory Cup trials on a B25 Empire Star.
