= Matchless G3/L =

British motorcycle model

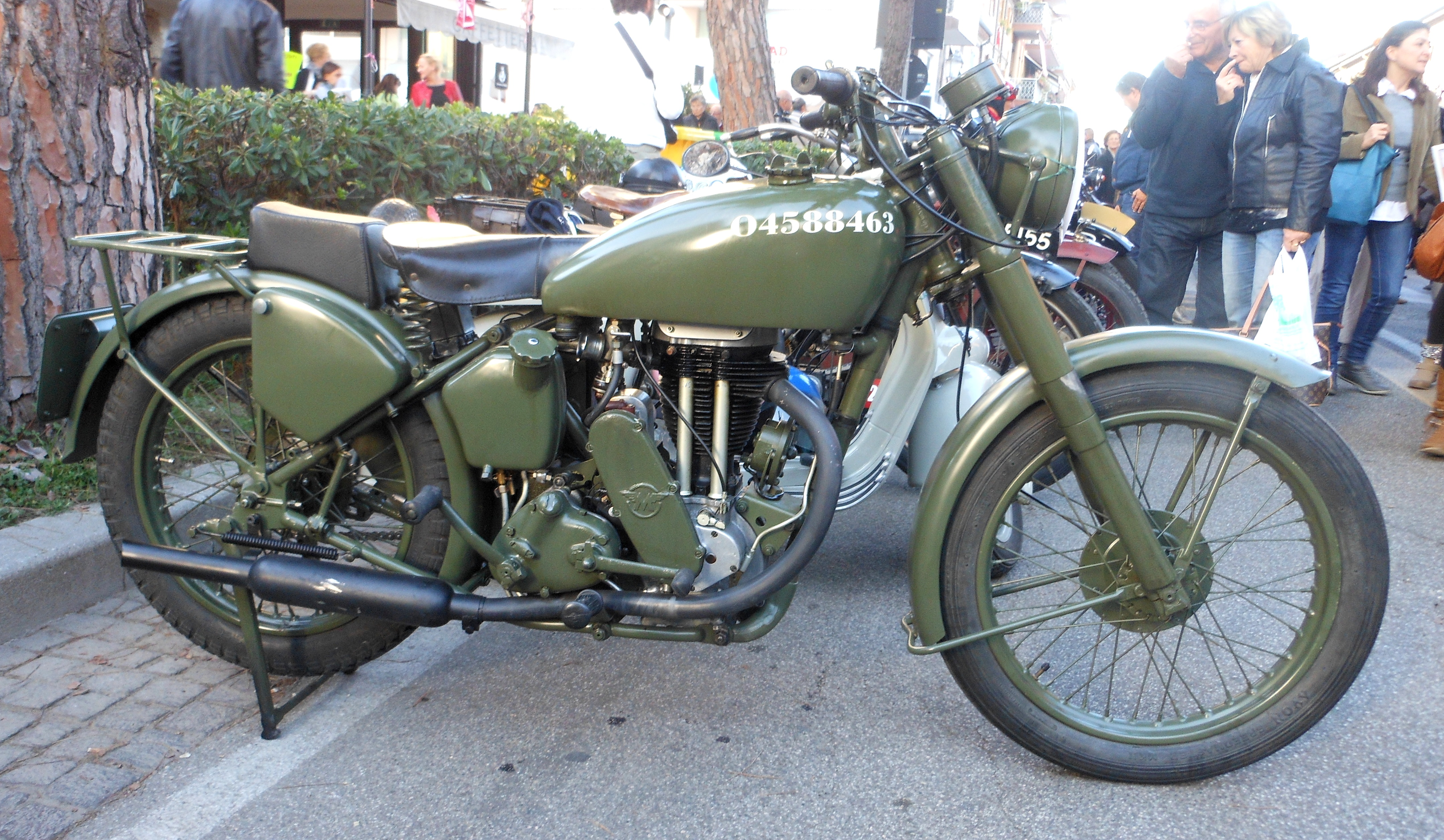
- Manufacturer: Matchless
- Production: 1939-46
- Predecessor: Matchless G3
- Engine: 349cc air cooled single
- Power: 16 BHP @ 5200 rpm
- Transmission: 4 speed with chain drive

The Matchless G3/L is a motorcycle developed for use by the British Army during the Second World War, when Matchless manufactured 80,000 G3 and G3/L models. The G3/L became one of the most popular motorcycles used during the war, as it was the first to replace the unforgiving "girder" front forks with a new technology, "Teledraulic" suspension. The Ministry of Defence continued to use the bikes into the 1960s.

== Development ==
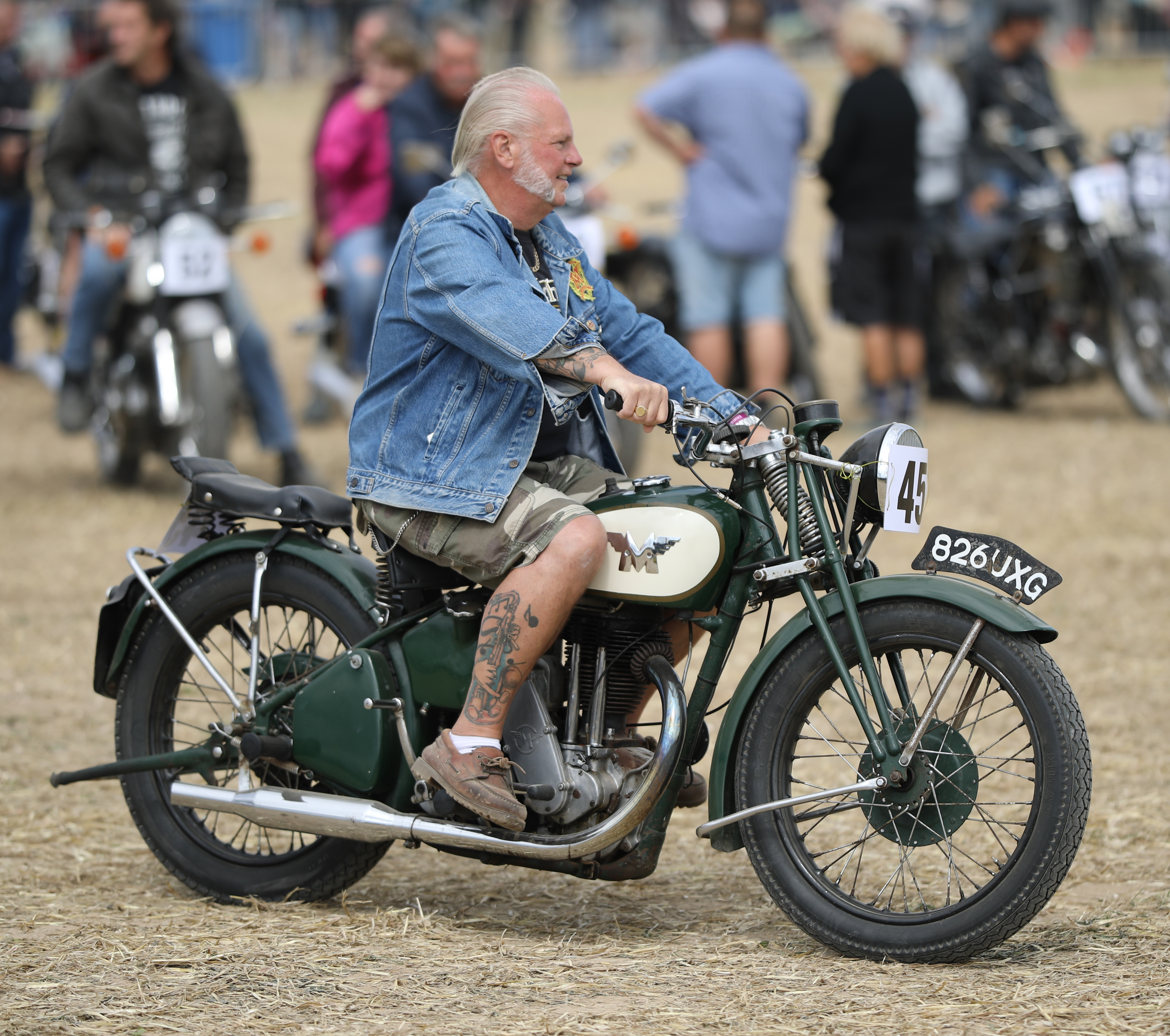
Pre war Matchless G3 from which the G3/L was developed

In 1940 the British War Office requisitioned every available Matchless motorcycle to replace those lost at Dunkirk. Developed from the pre-war G3, the 'L' in the G3/L stood for "lightweight" in response to the War Office requirement for a motorcycle more suited to off-road use, as the designers managed to reduce the dry weight of the prototype by 56 pounds (25 kg) (although the later models were not so lightweight due to the additional army equipment that needed to be added). The real innovation of the G3/L was the "Teledraulic" forks, which were the first telescopic design with oil damping – an idea that was to become the standard for almost all future motorcycles.

After exhaustive military testing the G3/L lost the War Office competition for a single standard 350 cc machine to Triumph's 350 cc side-valve vertical twin, the 3TW, which had a top speed of over 70 mph and weighed 240 pounds (110 kg). Triumph's Priory Street works in Coventry were completely destroyed by German bombers in November 1940 All Triumph's technical records, drawings and designs were lost and Matchless won the contract. Triumph instead produced 350 cc sidevalves for the military during the war.

Production of the G3/L began in late 1941, and a series of modifications and improvements were introduced as it entered military service. From 1942 the entire output of the Matchless factory was dedicated to the G3/L.

== Active service ==
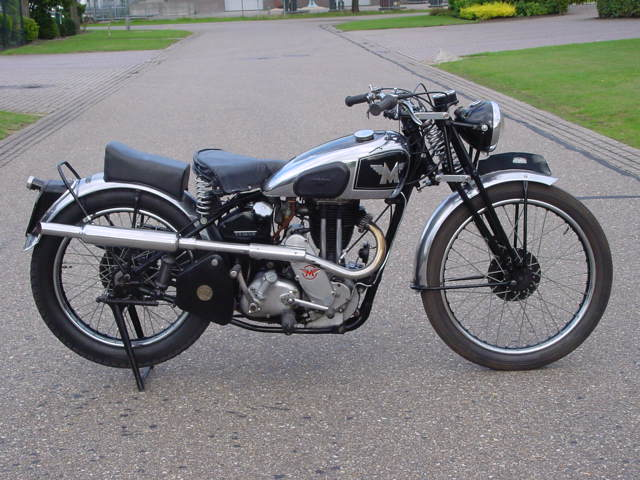
1939 G3/L

In 1940, 110 Matchless G3/L's were ordered from England by the South African Army as the preferred machine for use by despatch riders.

As well as general army transport G3/L's were widely used for delivering messages that were too important to be sent by radio or by telephone.

They were also used for convoy escort, having to read maps and act as an "advance party" into occupied territory. Dispatch riders were an easy target for snipers, had to use dimmed headlights and coped with poor road conditions. In a Second World War study, Sir Hugh Cairns identified head injuries as a major cause of loss of life among dispatch riders and recommended crash helmets instead of the standard "tin helmet" or forage caps that were often worn. Sir Hugh's recommendation eventually led to compulsory crash helmets for motorcyclists – but not for another 32 years.

== Post war ==
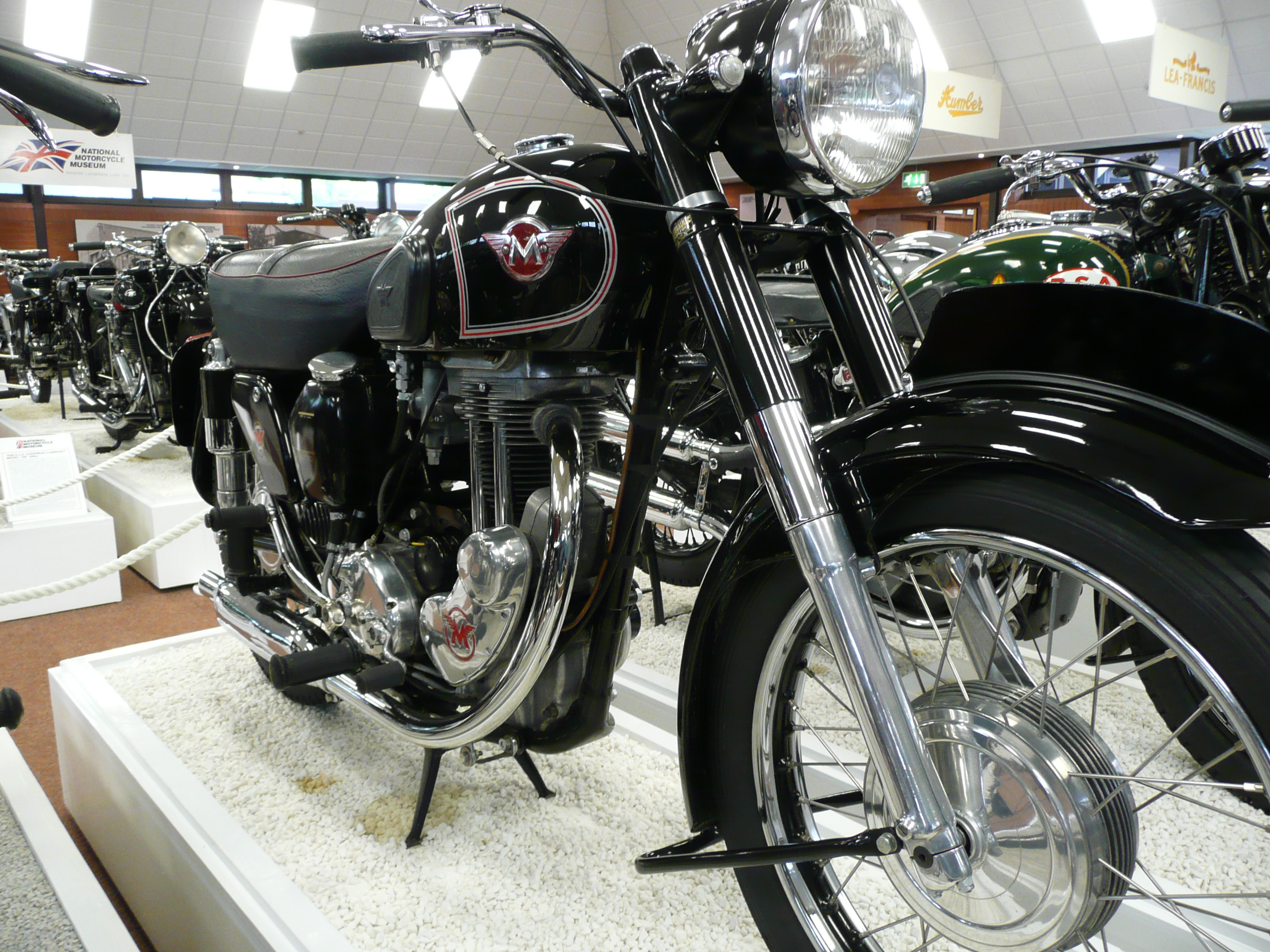
Matchless G3LS (1955) at the National Motorcycle Museum (UK)

A war-torn infrastructure and shortages made life problematic in places like Italy, but there were a few consolations for the Italian people to help themselves get back to normality. The Germans, British and Americans had all been in and out of Italy as invaders and liberators, and they had discarded or abandoned huge amounts of military hardware including tanks, trucks and motorcycles. Some of these motorcycles, such as the Matchless G3/L, were converted from military service to civilian service by Italian riders.

Post-war G3/Ls were the military version finished in black instead of green or khaki. Despite its age, the Matchless was so well proven and reliable it remained in use by the Ministry of Defence for another 15 years after the end of the war, until replaced in 1960 by the BSA W-B40.

The Matchless G3/L was a popular choice for UK trials riders, and after the war there were plenty of bikes and spares to enable champions such as Artie Ratcliffe and Ted Usher to win numerous national events for Matchless.

The Royal Artillery Motor Cycle Display Team gave their first performance at the St Asaph Tattoo in July 1949 and used the G3/L for displays until they were replaced with the BSA Gold Star.

The end was in sight, however, as the G3 was gaining weight without any corresponding increase in power. Suspension was upgraded to a swinging arm from 1949 and an aluminium cylinder head fitted from 1951. In 1955 the engine was uprated with stronger main bearings and an "auto-advance" fitted to the rotating magnet magneto, (now front-mounted for access). Front forks were also upgraded to improve handling and in 1958 an alternator was fitted and optional chrome tank panels, steering damper, brake light system and air filter were offered.

The wartime G3/L today can cost up to £5,000 in original condition with the correct WD equipment.

== See also ==
- BSA M20 – BSA wartime motorcycle used by British Army
- Triumph 3HW – Second World War replacement for the TR3, sidevalve 350 cc
- Ariel W/NG 350 – wartime 350 cc OHV single from Ariel
