= Bert Perrigo =

- Born: 1903; Birmingham, UK
- Died: 1985 (aged 81–82)
- Occupations: Motorcycle designer and manufacturer

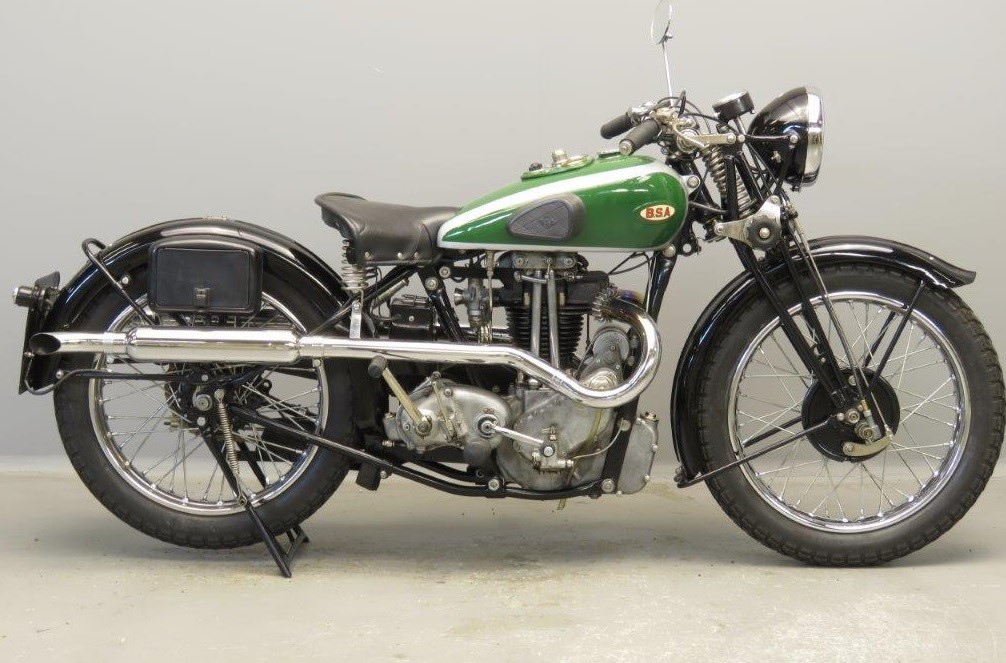
1935 BSA W35-8 Blue Star

Albert Perrigo (1903–1985) was a British engineer who was a successful motorcycle trials rider before becoming Competition Manager for BSA motorcycles where his ideas influenced the design of many of their best selling motorcycles.

== Early life ==
Born in 1902 in Small Heath, Birmingham, Bert Perrigo's father was a baker but instead of following into the family bakery Bert got a job driving vans for a local motorcycle company. Bordesley Engineering Co of New Bond Street Birmingham had been producing motorcycles under the Connaught brand name since 1912. While he was working for Bordesley Engineering Perrigo persuaded them to enter him in the London to Edinburgh 24-hour trial, which he won, securing the first of many gold medals.

== Motorcycle designer ==
When Bordesley Engineering closed in 1926 Bert Perrigo moved to BSA and joined the competitions department. His motorcycle trials success was important to BSA and they developed the BSA Blue Star range with help from Perrigo, who was paid one-half-penny royalty for every Blue Star sold. His first major commercial success was in 1937 when Wal Handley was presented with a Brooklands Gold Star for lapping the circuit at over 100 mph (160 km/h) on a 500 cc BSA Empire Star. Any rider who achieved a 100 mph (160 km/h) lap during a race was awarded a "Gold Star", which was a 1-inch (2.5 cm) enamel badge a small square on the bottom of it which said "100", but Perrigo saw a good marketing opportunity and persuaded BSA bosses to invest in the development of the 350 cc and 500 cc BSA Gold Star which became a top seller for BSA for the next two decades until 1963. Perrigo was rewarded with promotion to become the Chief Engineer and Works Manager of the BSA Motor Cycle team.

Perrigo also led the BSA Maudes Trophy when three BSA Stars successfully completed the round Europe tour. As well as entering the International Six Days Trial, Bert's team completed 4,500 miles (7,200 km) with no mechanical problems — a major selling point for BSA at time when reliability was a key factor.

== Racing career ==
Perrigo won the inaugural British Experts Trial in 1929 and went on to become a leading trials rider and represented Britain in the International Six Days Trial and won a gold medal at the ISDT in Merano, Italy in 1931. In 1937 Perrigo rode a B25 Empire Star to success in both the Colmore Cup and Victory Cup trials.

== Death ==
Bert Perigo died in 1985 at the age of 82.
