= Ariel 3 (moped) =

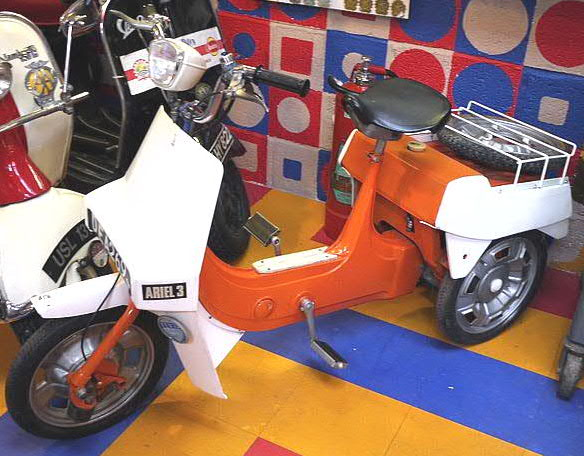
- Ariel 3
- Manufacturer: BSA
- Production: 1970–1974
- Class: Moped
- Engine: 50 cc (3.1 cu in) air-cooled two-stroke single
- Brakes: Drum, front and rear

The Ariel 3 was a tricycle moped produced by the BSA factory in the UK. The Ariel 3 was a sales flop whose £2M development cost contributed significantly to the demise of BSA.

Even the Ariel 3's promotion was ill-conceived, the sales slogan being "Here it is - whatever it is!". Cohn Atkinson attributes its failure to a remote management at BSA who "didn't even like bikes" and who "made the most appalling decisions" on production and marketing.

== Design ==
The engine was a Dutch Anker 50 cc (3.1 cu in) 2-stroke, situated between the rear wheels. The pressed-steel forward section of the frame, supported by torsion bars, could swivel to enable the rider to lean the vehicle into bends like a motorcycle. The front "fork" was a single-sided down tube with a rudimentary rubber block suspension. All three pressed steel wheels were interchangeable. Drive was to just one of the rear wheels, and only one of the rear wheels had a brake, a small drum item. There was a similar front drum brake. A true moped, the Ariel 3's engine was started by first pedalling and then releasing a decompressor trigger. The rider could assist the little motor on hills by pedalling. The six volt headlight was single beam, with no dip. There was no rear suspension.

== See also ==
- List of Ariel motorcycles
