= Suicide clutch =

Term for motorcycles' foot-operated clutch and hand shifter

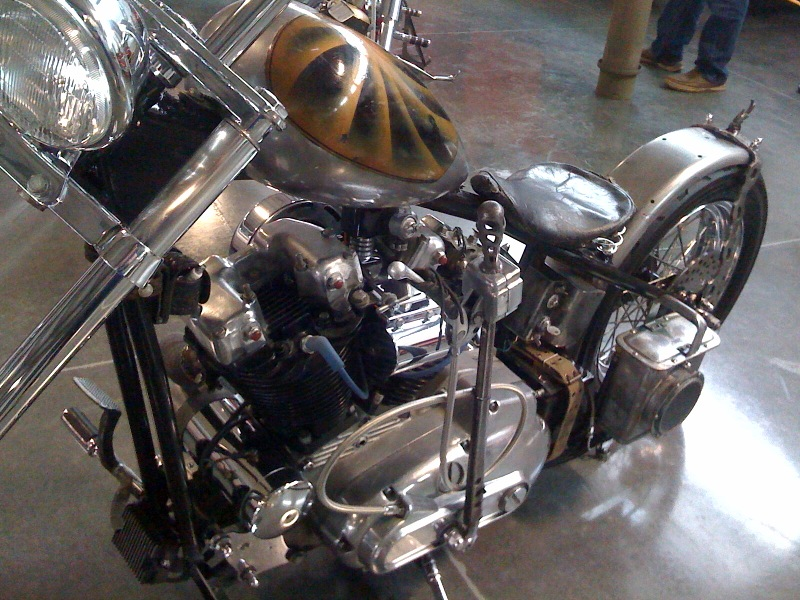
A chopper with a clutched hand shifter

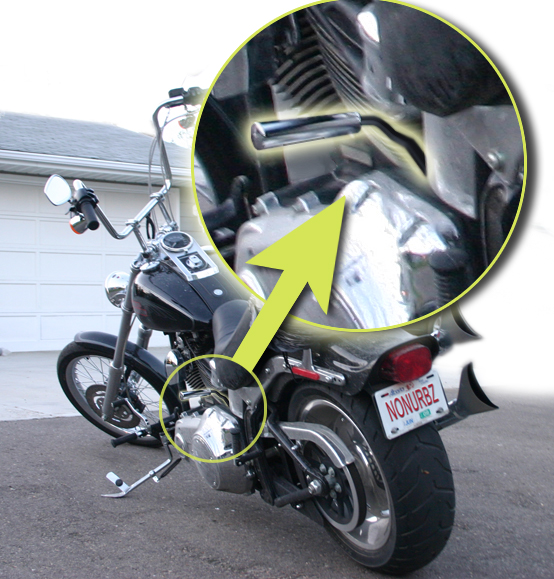
A Harley motorcycle with an aftermarket "jockey shifter".

The terms suicide clutch, and suicide shifter or jockey shifter, refer to some motorcycles' foot-operated clutch and hand shifter to change gears. Foot clutches (rocker-clutches) and hand shifters (tank-shifts) were found on early motorcycle designs from around the turn of the 20th century to the 1940s or 50s, and reappearing on modern retro styled custom motorcycles and choppers. Modern motorcycles do not require removing a hand from the handlebars to shift gears, using only the fingers for the clutch and the toes of one foot to select gears. In contrast, the fanciful slang "suicide" was applied to designs where the rider removes one hand to change gears, or cannot put both feet on the ground while using a foot clutch to disengage the transmission. Sometimes the shifter is referred to as a "jockey shifter" while the foot clutch is called a "suicide clutch".

Suicide clutches were common on mid-20th century Harley-Davidson motorcycles and many custom bikes today still employ this system. Harley-Davidson introduced the hand clutch on the 1952 Panhead.

More technically, "suicide clutch" can refer to clutch controls lacking a detent on the foot clutch, which would otherwise allow the rider to lock the clutch in the disengaged position. Early foot-clutch motorcycles, such as those from Harley-Davidson and Indian, allowed the rider to lock the clutch foot pedal due to its over-center geometry plus a helper spring (aka "sissy spring"), so they could place both feet on the ground when stopped. These standard clutches are called a "rocker clutch". If this device was disabled, or a custom foot clutch was installed that had no detent, it was referred to as a "suicide clutch" because stopping the motorcycle in-gear required the rider to keep his foot on the pedal. Should he lose his balance and put the left foot down, the motorcycle could lurch forward into cross traffic. The suicide clutch, especially on a chopper with no front brake, also made stopping at a red light on a hill especially precarious.

The suicide clutch is sometimes incorrectly called a suicide shifter. The suicide clutch is a foot-operated clutch that is mounted on the left side of the motorcycle's forward foot controls. The suicide-clutch moniker has derived from difficulties in operating this form of clutch and shifter. On a motorcycle equipped with a conventional hand clutch and foot shifter, the rider places the left foot on the ground when stopped and holds the motorcycle in place with pressure on the rear brake pedal with the right foot, while engaging the clutch with the left hand. On a motorcycle equipped with a suicide clutch, the clutch is held in with the left foot, requiring the right foot to hold the bike in place, with the right hand applying pressure to the front brake. Early Harley Davidson foot clutches used an over-center spring to hold the clutch pedal in the disengaged position and used a friction disc to allow the rider to adjust the sensitivity of the return. Often riders removed the spring to keep the clutch pedal from returning to the disengaged position while riding. While this spring removal allowed for the clutch to stay engaged better, it also removed the safety feature of the clutch pedal holding itself in the disengaged position. With the pedal not returning to its natural disengaged position, the rider must either shift into neutral or hold the clutch pedal with the left foot when coming to a stop. Early Harley Davidson racers removed the clutch return spring to ensure the clutch stayed in the engaged position throughout the race. This practice soon caught on with other riders. The term "suicide clutch" was coined by those who could not operate the foot clutch proficiently enough to ride a tank shift (or hand shift) motorcycle in normal traffic.

== Types of shifters ==
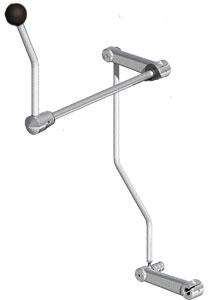
Old-style tank shift.

Regular clutch hand Shifter - This is where the shifter is a regular knob either located on the tank, which operates through a linkage to the transmission (tank shifter) or on a lever bolted directly to the top of the transmission (jockey shifter or slap shifter depending on the transmission design) and involves the semi-complex task of foot clutch operation and hand shifting. The foot is used to operate the clutch pedal clutch lever and the second hand is used to shift gears.

Clutched Shifter - This shifter has a clutch lever on it allowing one-handed shifting. This design allows the left foot to be free.

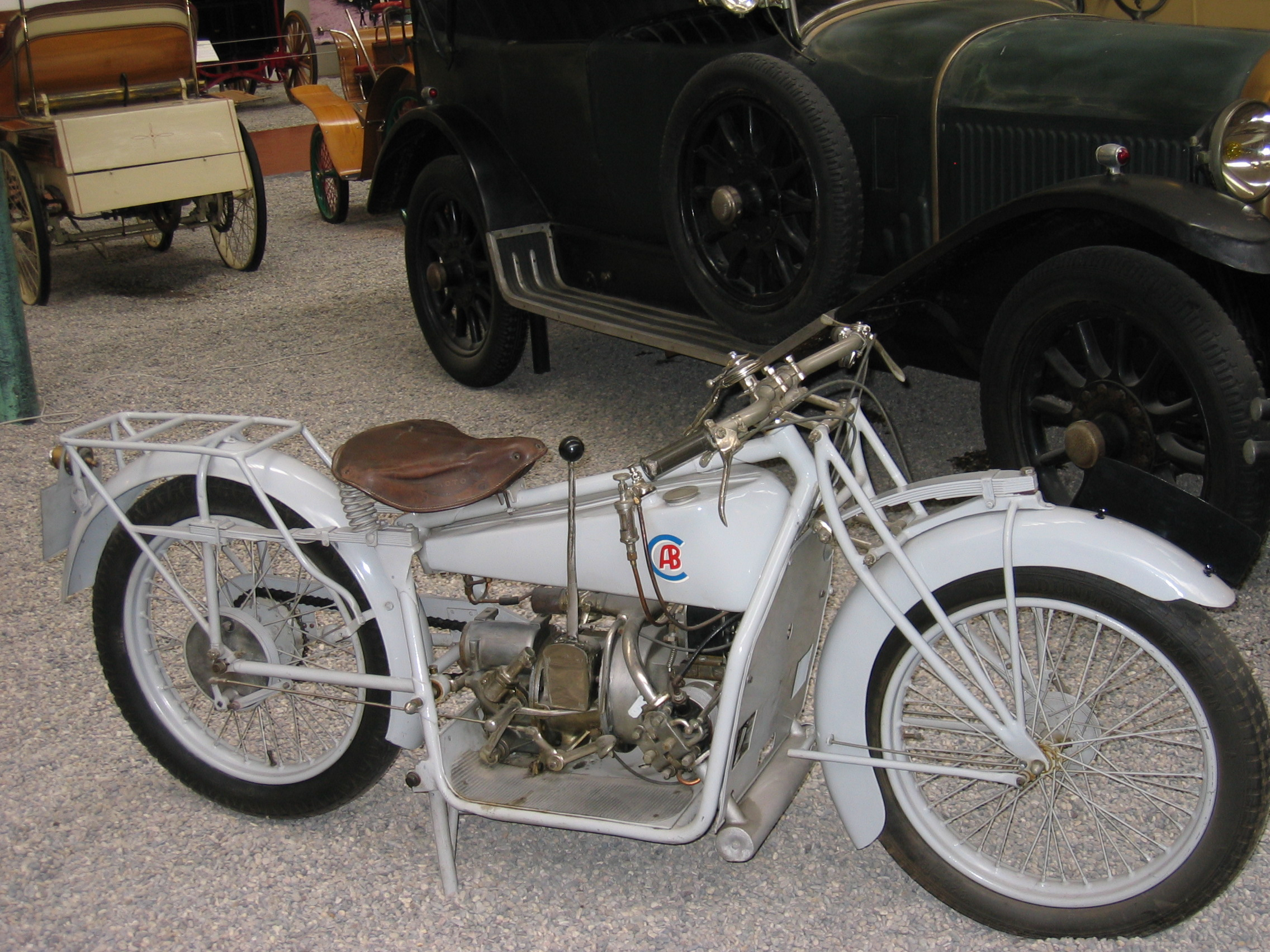
ABC motorcycle with hand shifter at the Cité de l'Automobile museum.

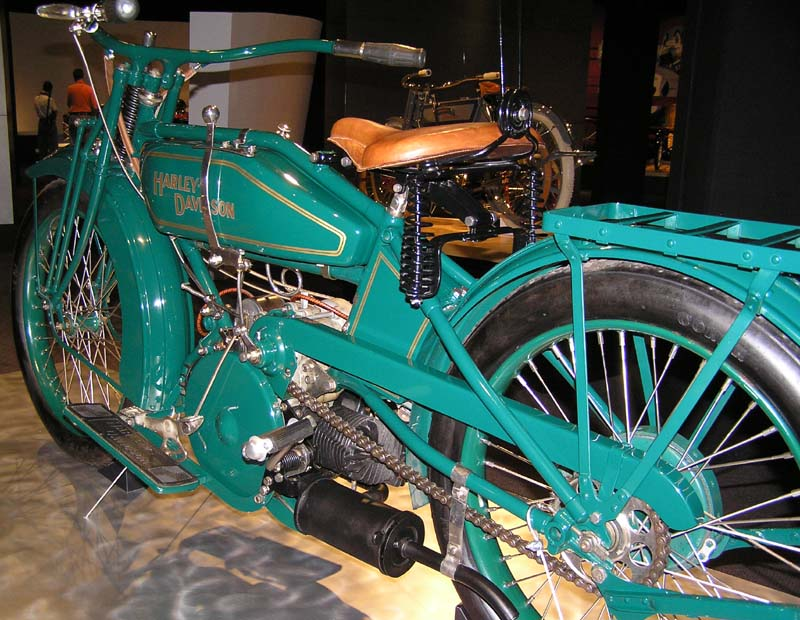
1919 Harley-Davidson Model W Sport Twin with hand shifter at The Art of the Motorcycle, Memphis.

== Technical history ==
Foot clutches with tank shifters were standard on American motorcycles such as Harley-Davidson and Indian up to the mid-20th century and many custom bikes today still employ this system. The system used by Harley-Davidson arranged the controls with the tank shifter on the left side of the motorcycle, with the throttle operated by the right hand and the shifter, spark control and front brake operated by the left hand. The Harley-Davidson rocker clutch was operated with the left foot with the heel down position to disengage the clutch (with an over-center spring to hold the clutch disengaged) and the toe down position to engage it ("Toe-to-go"). The right foot operated the rear brake, as is the practice in modern times. Indian, meanwhile arranged things differently. On an Indian, the tank shifter was located on the right side of the motorcycle, with the throttle operated by the left hand and the shifter, spark control and front brake operated by the right hand. (Indian promoted their system to police departments saying that the officer could fire his service weapon with his right hand while riding) The Indian rocker clutch was also operated by the left foot, but the toe down position disengaged the clutch and the heel down position engaged it. Harley-Davidson introduced the hand clutch on the 1952 Panhead, and simultaneously on the K model, their all-new sport model. The transmissions of the foot shift and the hand shift models were different. The hand shift gear selector mechanism was referred to as the "jockey top" or "jockey lid." On this transmission, the gears were selected in a linear fashion with the selector arm moving further and further forward with each successive gear and the gear lever moved in a slotted gate on the side of the tank. When modified to operate as a "jockey shifter," The lever would be pushed back for 1st gear and then step by step more forward for each subsequent gear. The foot shift gear selector mechanism was referred to as the "ratchet top". On this transmission, the gears were selected in a ratcheting motion, returning to its default, central position after each shift. When modified to operate with short, transmission mounted hand lever and a foot suicide clutch, this type of set-up was referred to as a "slap shifter" or "slapper". In contrast to the jockey shifter, the slap shifter would always stay in one central position between shifts. Throughout the 50s and 60s on the Panheads and subsequent Shovelheads, foot clutches and hand clutches coexisted, with the hand clutch being progressively more popular over time. After foot clutches had all but disappeared from Harley-Davidson civilian models, the last holdout of foot clutches were the police models up to the early 70's, presumably because the police officers could use their 2-way radio with the left hand while clutching with their foot.

The jockey shifter is a gear shifting device used on motorcycles before the use of a foot-operated shift lever. A jockey shifter gets its name from the location of the motorcycle rider's hand when shifting gears. It is under his seat like the position of a jockey's hand while using his riding crop on his horse. This hand shifter lever is directly mounted to the transmission and is just long enough to clear the primary drive cover or belt drive. A motorcycle equipped with this type of shifter requires the use of a foot clutch. The foot clutch comes in one of two configurations; either a rocker foot clutch, which was stock on many early motorcycles, or a suicide foot clutch, which was never available on production motorcycles but was manufactured by daring motorcycle enthusiasts. The suicide foot clutch was usually a very simple lever, more or less a mirror image of the rear brake lever on the other side of the motorcycle; like a standard shift car's clutch lever. The rocker foot clutch is easier to use than the suicide foot clutch because it can be rocked into a position where the clutch is either engaged or disengaged - leaving the rider's foot free to be put down, at a stop, to steady the motorcycle. Sometimes a tank shifter is referred to as a jockey shifter, but this is incorrect due to the rider's hand position being in front of him, not behind him like for a horse jockey. A tank shifter is also connected to the transmission with linkage, which jockey shifters do not use. The earliest known use of a foot clutch and hand shifter, on motorcycles, was with the first multi-geared transmission on the 1915 Harley Davidson. It is a mechanical linkage that is typically mounted to the left side of the motorbike's fuel tank and is held in place by a slotted piece of metal welded to the frame or the tank. Through a series of linkages, it is connected to the transmission shift selection lever. In terms comparable to a motorcycle of current construction, it is simply a way to relocate the shift lever from the front foot controls to the side of the gas tank. Early motorcycle customizers who were trying to reduce their motorcycle's weight so as to increase its power-to-weight ratio would sometimes replace their stock rocker foot clutch with a hand fabricated suicide foot clutch, and remove the tank shifter's linkage and instead attach a shifter arm directly to the transmission (jockey shifter). This reduced weight not only made the bike accelerate better, but also gave the rider bragging rights of riding a motorcycle which required more skill to operate.
