= Val Page =

British motorcycle designer

- Born: 1891; Hackney England
- Died: 1978 (aged 86–87); Cheltenham England
- Occupation: Motorcycle designer

Valentine Page (1891–1978) was a British motorcycle designer. He worked for leading UK marques including JAP, Ariel, Triumph, and BSA. Page was an innovator whose radical designs include the Triumph 6/1; BSA Gold Star, M20, and A7; Ariel Leader; and the JAP engine of the Brough Superior SS100.

== JAP ==
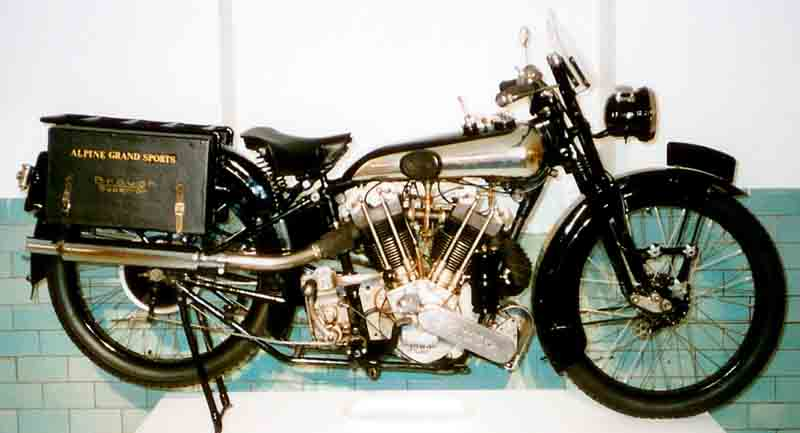
Brough Superior SS 100

Val Page served his apprenticeship as a motorcycle engineer and designer with JAP. Page designed the engines used in the Brough Superior SS80 and SS100 luxury motorcycles, and developed the racing motorcycles which made riders such as Bert le Vack famous.

== Ariel ==
Page spent most of his career with Ariel Motorcycles, which he joined in 1925. Eventually he became chief designer and developed a new range of engines for the 1926 season. For the 1927 season he designed a new frame, but it had a weakness that led to breakages and warranty claims. He rectified this with a revised frame for the 1928 season.

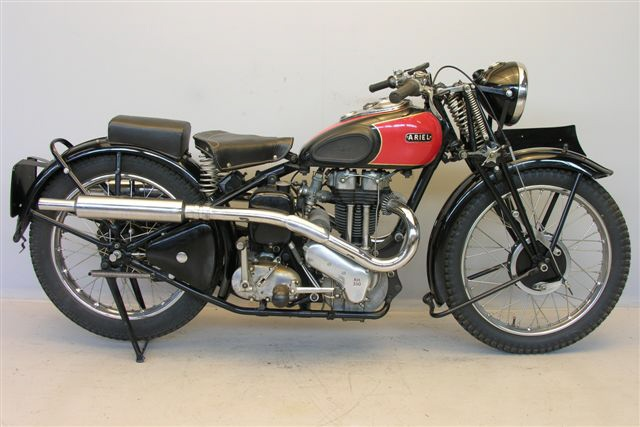
Ariel Red Hunter 1938

Page's designs formed the basis for what became the Red Hunter, which continued until Ariel ceased production of four-strokes in 1959.

== Triumph ==
Page left Ariel in 1932 to become chief designer at the rival Triumph where, with Edward Turner, he developed Triumph's first parallel twin, the model 6/1, and a range of singles, including a 150cc two-stroke and 250, 350 and 500cc four-strokes.

== BSA ==
In 1936 Page moved to BSA, where he designed all new models except the V-twins. His designs included the Empire Star, which was developed into the high performance production BSA Gold Star, named in celebration of Wal Handley's 100 mph lap time at the Brooklands circuit. The innovative Gold Star had a single cylinder 500 cc engine with twin pushrods operating double-coil springs and overhead valves. The pushrod tunnel was an integral casting in the cylinder block. Page also designed the M20 side-valve motorcycle, of which 125,000 served in the Second World War.

== Return to Ariel ==
After the War he returned to Ariel. There he designed the monocoque Ariel Leader two-stroke twin, which was launched in 1958.
