= Ariel Leader =

British motorcycle

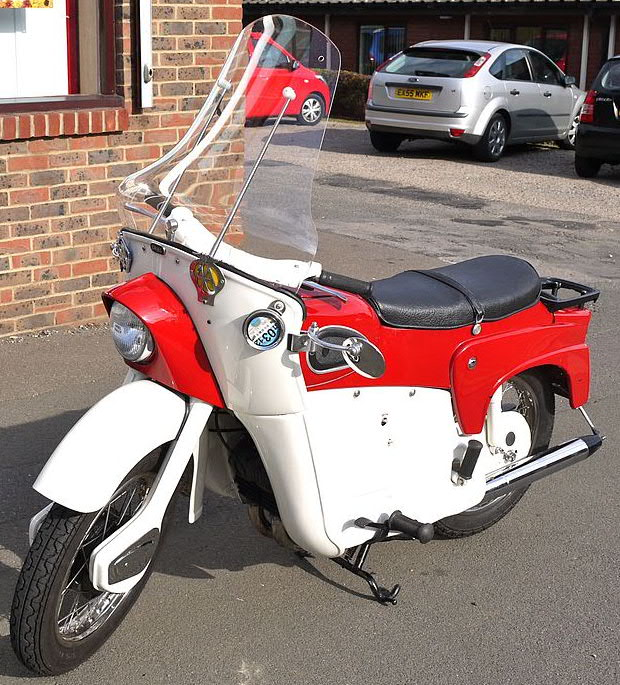
- Manufacturer: Ariel Motorcycles
- Production: 1958–65
- Successor: Ariel Arrow
- Engine: 249 cc (15.2 cu in), two-stroke twin, alloy head
- Bore / stroke: 54 mm × 54 mm (2.1 in × 2.1 in)
- Top speed: 68 mph (109 km/h)
- Power: 16 bhp (12 kW) at 6,400 rpm
- Transmission: Four-speed, unit construction, fully enclosed half-inch pitch chain final drive
- Suspension: (front) trailing link oil-damped (rear) swinging arm
- Brakes: 6-inch (150 mm) front and rear drums
- Tires: Front and rear tyre 3.25 x 16 in
- Wheelbase: 51 inches (1,300 mm)
- Seat height: 30 inches (760 mm)
- Weight: 330 pounds (150 kg) (Note: Weight varies according to optional equipment fitted) (dry)
- Fuel capacity: 2 imperial gallons (9.1 L; 2.4 US gal)
- Fuel consumption: 80 miles per imperial gallon (3.5 L/100 km; 67 mpg_{‑US}) maximum
- Turning radius: 8 feet (2.4 m)

The Ariel Leader was a British motorcycle produced by Ariel Motorcycles between 1958 and 1965. A radical design, the Leader was fully enclosed with an integral windscreen and was the first British motorcycle to have optional flashing indicators. After a few years of success, Ariel could no longer compete against Japanese imports. The last Ariel Leader was made when the factory closed in 1965.

== Development ==
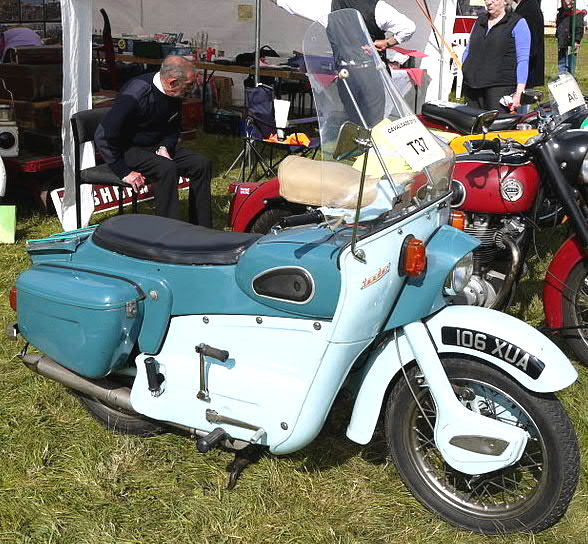
Leader with optional panniers and indicators

Designed by Val Page and Bernard Knight, The Ariel Leader featured a 250 cc two-stroke engine suspended from a monocoque 'backbone' fabricated from 20-gauge pressed steel panels. The fuel tank was hidden inside this structure and accessed by lifting the hinged dual seat. A dummy petrol tank was used for storage and was large enough to fit a spare crash helmet. It was the fully enclosed body, similar to that developed by Phil Vincent for the innovative Vincent Black Prince, that was most prominent, as none of the working parts of the motorcycle were visible.

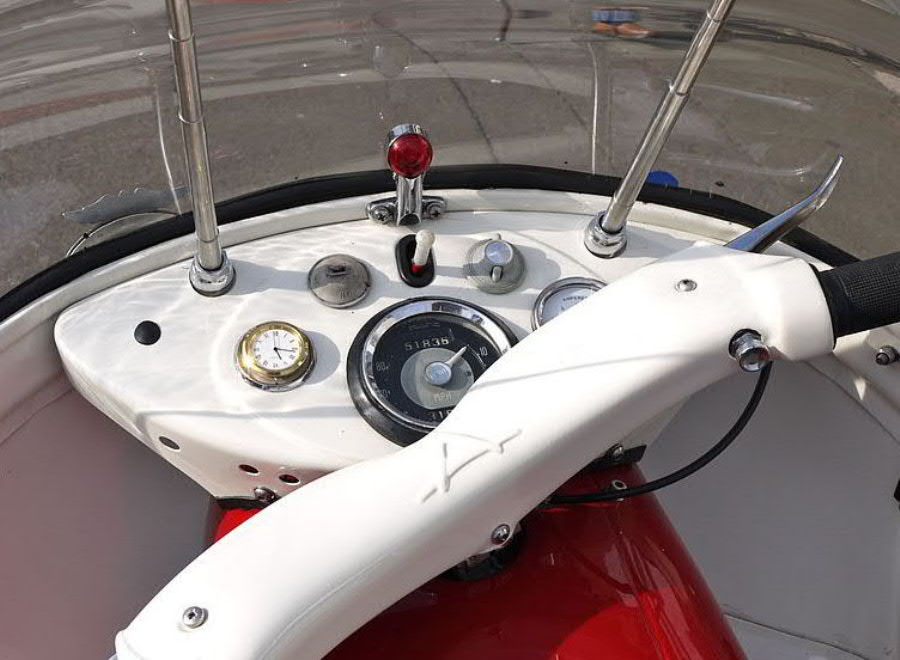
Leader dash showing parking light behind screen with headlamp trimmer knob near to speedometer

As well as a full body, the standard Leader features included a headlight trimmer, an extendable lifting handle for easy centrestand use, and a permanent windscreen mounting. Factory listed options included: integral hard-luggage panniers, the first flashing indicators on a British motorcycle, a dash-mounted parking light, windscreen top-extension (adjustable on the move), a rear rack and a clock aperture built into a dashboard, which was closed by an Ariel badge when not fitted.

== Launch ==
Launched in mid-1958, the Leader claimed to offer the comfort of a scooter with the performance of a motorcycle. It sold well, and it won the Motor Cycle News Motorcycle of the Year award in 1959. Ariel supported the launch with a range of options, which was unusual at the time. Hence few of the 22,000 Ariel Leaders produced were the same. Colour schemes, many of them two-tone, were also a break with tradition. They included Oriental Blue or Cherry Red with Admiral Gray accents.

== Ariel Arrow ==
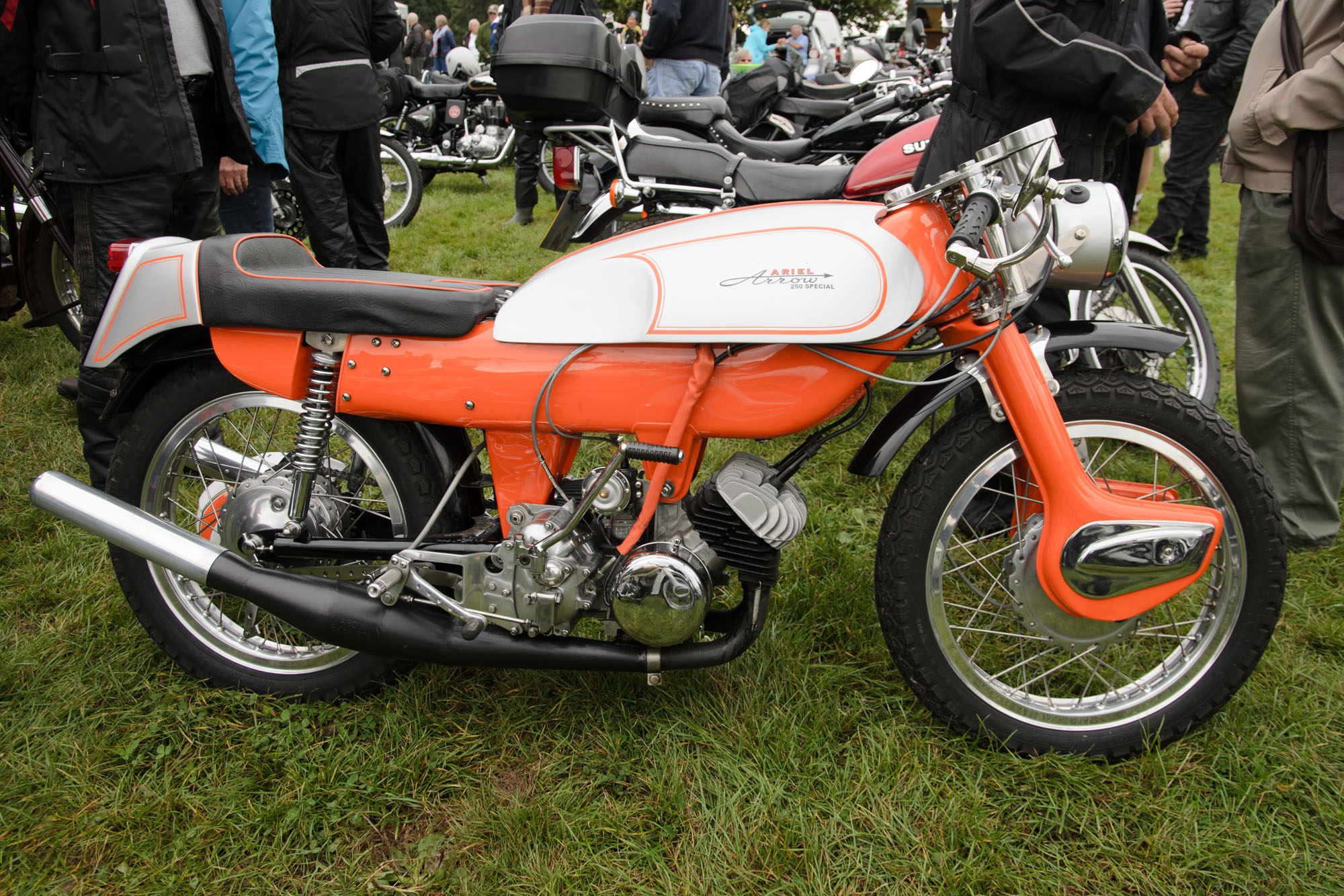
Ariel Arrow 250 Special

This was a cheaper, stripped Leader produced from 1959 and was developed into the Golden Arrow sport version in 1961.

A sister-machine designated Ariel Arrow 200 – with a smaller capacity of 200 cc, achieved by reducing the bore to 48.5 mm from 54 mm whilst retaining the same stroke – was available from 1964 to bring it into a lower tax band and benefit from lower UK rider insurance premiums.

In his 1964 Motor Cycle road test, Bob Currie reported good performance, with an absolute top speed – with "rider lying flat, of course" – of 74 mph and a cruising speed which could be held at 60 mph.

The bike had the usual Arrow ivory background colour, but with the tank and chaincase finished in either aircraft blue or British Racing Green, and tank badges with the legend "Arrow 200".

After the Ariel factory closure, in 1967 Ariel marketed its last motorcycle, the Arrow 200 produced for a time by BSA.

In 1960, a prototype Arrow with a 349 cc twin-cylinder four-stroke engine was made to sell alongside the Ariel Leader. The budget engine, designed by Val Page to do 75 mph (121 km/h), was canted to fit the Arrow frame. It was thought the initial 18 bhp (13 kW) power output could have been increased to 24 bhp (18 kW), but development money ran out and the project was dropped.

== Demise ==
Later in the course of production, Ariel two-strokes failed to compete against Japanese imports. BSA closed the Ariel factory in 1965, but continued to make Ariel Arrows until 1967. In 1970 BSA revived the brand for the Ariel 3; a 49 cc trike that was a commercial failure.

== See also ==
- List of motorcycles of the 1950s
