= Ariel Red Hunter =

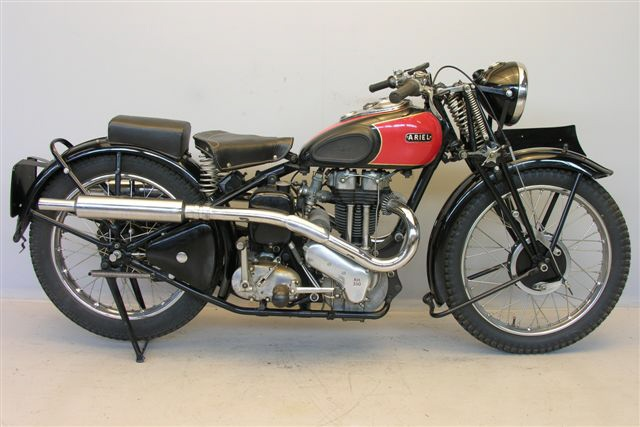
- Manufacturer: Ariel, Bournbrook, Birmingham
- Production: 1932 - 1959
- Engine: 250cc, 350cc and 500cc OHV two valve singles
- Top speed: 500cc: 87mph
- Power: 500cc: 24 bhp at 6000 rpm
- Transmission: Four-speed manual to chain final drive
- Suspension: Girder front forks, solid rear
- Brakes: Drum
- Weight: 500cc: 420 pounds (190 kg) (wet)

The Ariel Red Hunter was the name used for a range of Ariel single-cylinder and twin-cylinder motorcycles. They were designed by the firm's chief designer Val Page in 1932 around an overhead-valve single-cylinder engine he developed six years earlier. Originally a "sports" version of the Ariel 500, 250 and 350cc versions were developed and became popular with grass track and trials riders. From 1948, the 500cc twin-cylinder Ariels were produced in De Luxe (KG) and Red Hunter (KH) models.

All Red Hunters had a distinctive dark red petrol and oil tanks which were painted in the former Bournbrook cinema opposite the main Ariel factory in Dawlish Road. The engines were all run for two hours on a test bench to maintain Ariel's record of reliability and quality control.

The Red Hunter was a success and formed the backbone of the company, and made Ariel able to purchase Triumph. On the 500cc, acceleration from 0 to 60 mph could be achieved in 10.9 seconds, while stopping from 25 mph could be made under 24 feet.

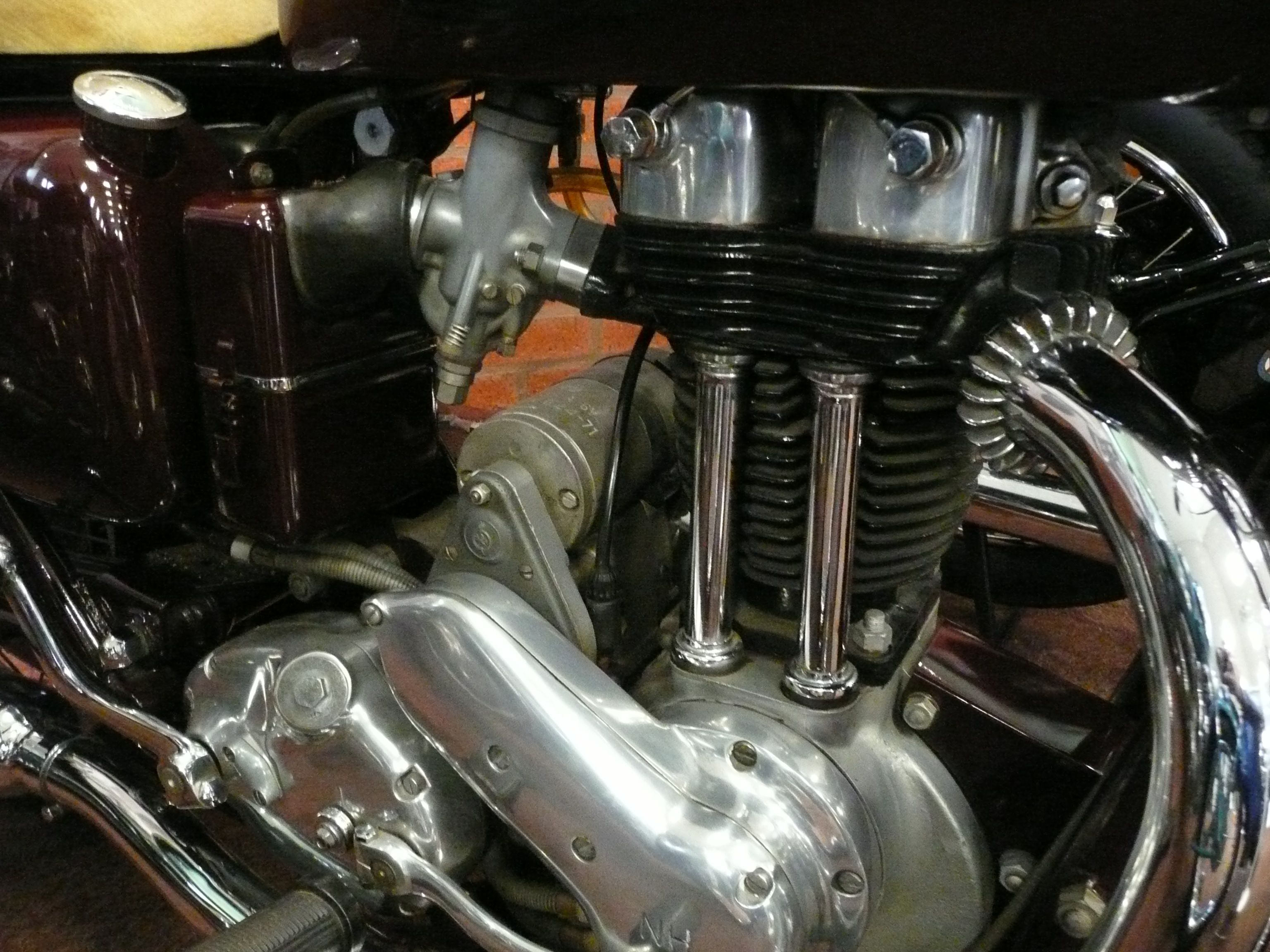
1955 Red Hunter close up showing pre-war engine type with cast-iron cylinder head

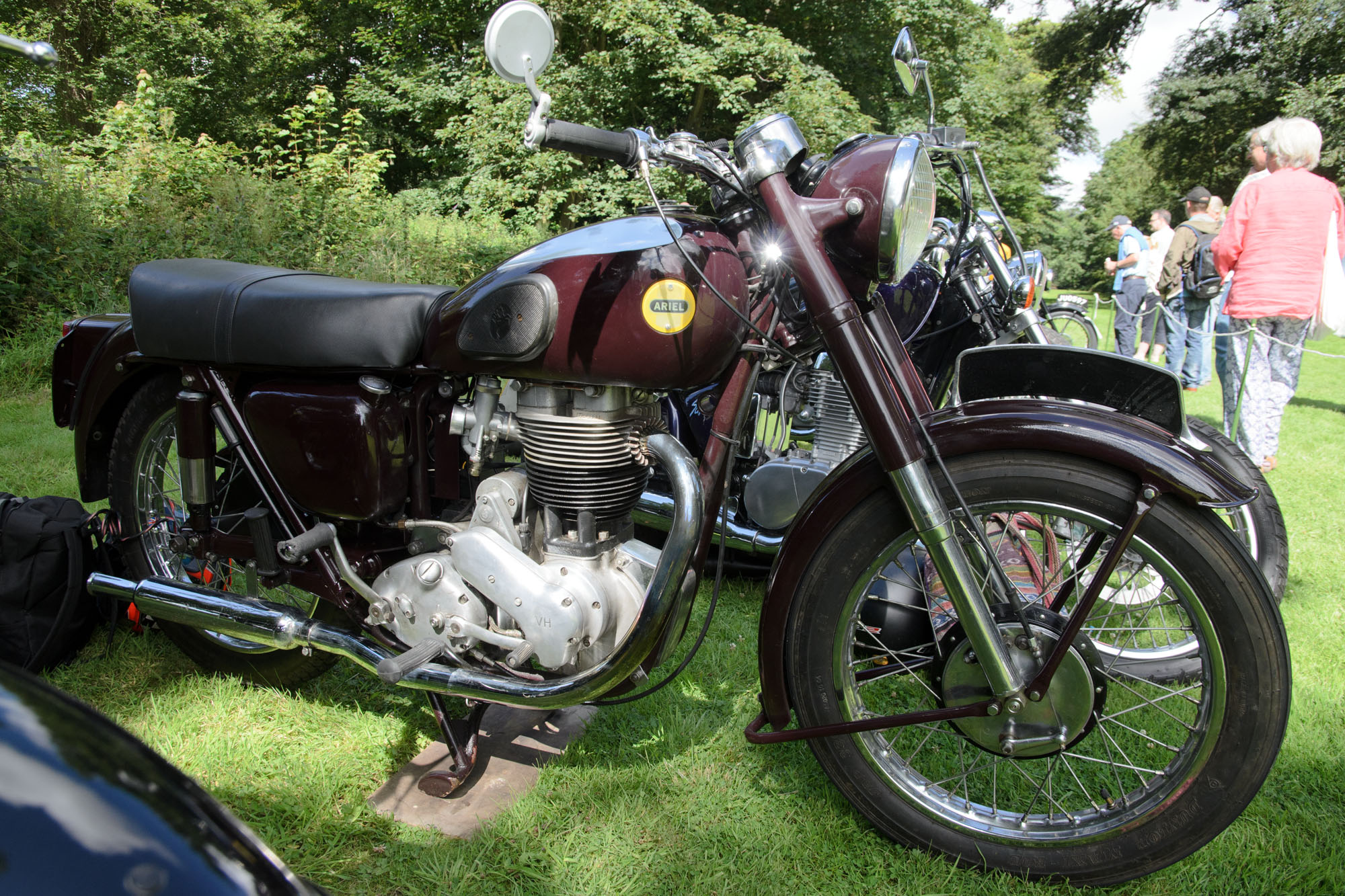
1954 Red Hunter with modern post-war engine type with aluminium alloy cylinder head

Edward Turner developed the design further with added chrome and it became a popular touring road bike. Handling was improved by the addition of rear suspension and telescopic forks and it gained an alloy cylinder head from the 1950s.

Champion Sammy Miller had great success with a 500cc Red Hunter from 1955.

== See also ==
- List of motorcycles of the 1930s
- List of motorcycles of the 1940s
- List of motorcycles of the 1950s
