= Ariel Motorcycles =

British bicycle manufacturer

- Industry: Manufacturing; Engineering
- Founded: 1902
- Founders: James Starley; William Hillman
- Defunct: 1970
- Fate: Sold to BSA and discontinued
- Successor: BSA
- Headquarters: Bournbrook, Birmingham
- Key people: Jack Sangster; Edward Turner; Val Page
- Products: Motorcycles

Ariel Motorcycles was a British maker of bicycles and then motorcycles in Bournbrook, Birmingham. It was an innovator in British motorcycling, part of the Ariel marque. The company was sold to BSA in 1951, but the brand survived until 1967. Influential Ariel designers included Val Page and Edward Turner. The last motorcycle-type vehicle to carry the Ariel name was a short-lived three-wheel tilting moped in 1970.

Ariel made bicycles before making motorcycles, and also made cars. Car production began in 1902, moved to Coventry in 1911, and ceased in 1925.

The 'Ariel' name was reused in 1999 for the formation of Ariel Motor Company, a sports car producer.

== History ==
=== The "Ariel" Bicycle ===
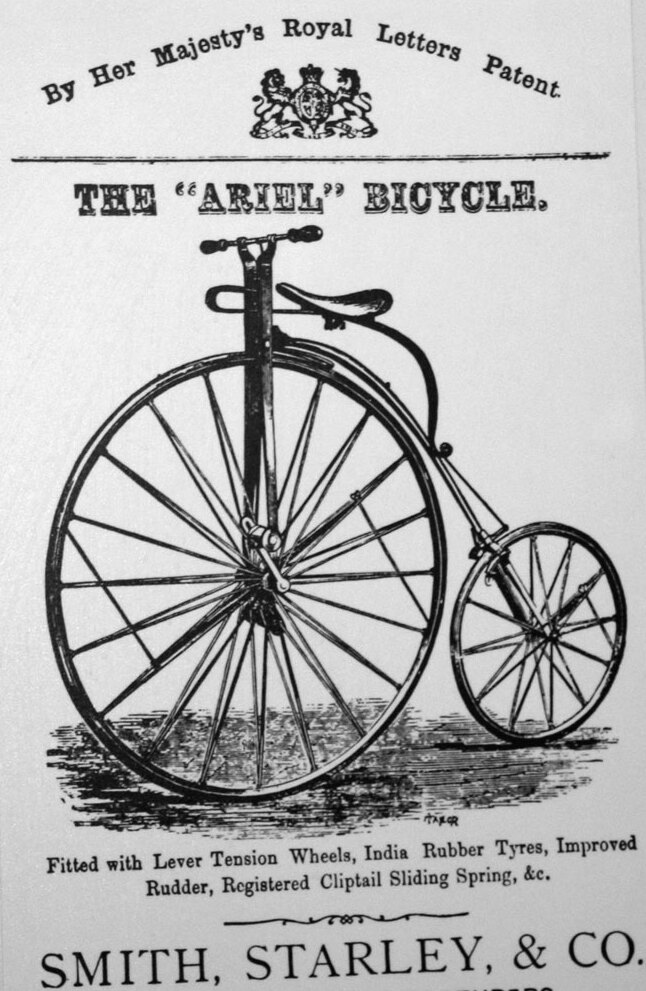
"Ariel" bicycle with lever-tensioned wire double-spokes, Advertisement 1871-1876

The "Ariel" bicycle was created in 1870 by James Starley and William Hillman, who had patented the design on 11 August 1870. William B. Smith later invested in the partnership and it became Smith, Starley & Co. until its dissolution in 1877. It was the first penny-farthing, an all-metal bicycle with wire-spoke wheels. Rather than using wooden spokes, which supported the hub under compression, it suspended the hub from the rim by wire spokes under tension. The suspension wheel had been patented by G.F.Bauer in 1802, but this was its first successful application to a bicycle.

Each wire spoke ran from a fixing on one side of the hub, through an eyelet at the rim to a fixing on the other side of the hub (this had previously been done on Reynolds' and Mays' "Phantom" bicycle of 1869). All the double-spokes were tensioned simultaneously using a system of three rods forming a Z. The central cross-bar was fixed to the hub; at each end, a perpendicular tie rod ran to the rim. As the tie rods were tensioned, the hub rotated relative to the rim, tensioning all the spokes. The bicycle was named after the spirit of the air, Ariel, on which the hubs of the wheels ran (as they were suspended).

The head of the "Ariel" bicycle was also a significant advance on that of previous "boneshakers". There were vertical posts on each side of the central pillar. These stopped the wheel from being rotated 360°, as in other bicycles of that date. In an accident the rider's leg could be trapped between the wheel and the frame, breaking it. (Note: Until about 1900, compound fractures (where the bone breaks through the skin) usually led to amputation: this ensured survival; the alternative could be death if the wound became gangrenous.)

=== Hillman's Bicycles and early motorised vehicles ===
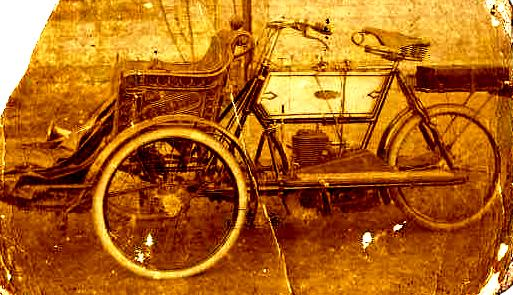
Ariel tricycle circa 1902

At first, manufacturing of the "Ariel" bicycle was contracted out to Haynes and Jefferies of Coventry. Later, they built a factory and put the name on it, where they also made sewing machines. In 1885, James Starley's nephew, John Kemp Starley, invented the Rover Safety Bicycle - a bicycle with similarly sized wheels and chain drive to the rear wheel, the design used on bicycles today.

Ariel merged with Westwood Manufacturing in 1896 and made a powered tricycle in 1898 with a 2.25 hp de Dion. Hillman left soon afterwards to found Premier Motorcycles. More tricycles were produced and motorised quadricycles were added in 1901 as Ariel moved into car production. (See also List of motorized trikes and/or Quadricycle)

=== Components Ltd. ===
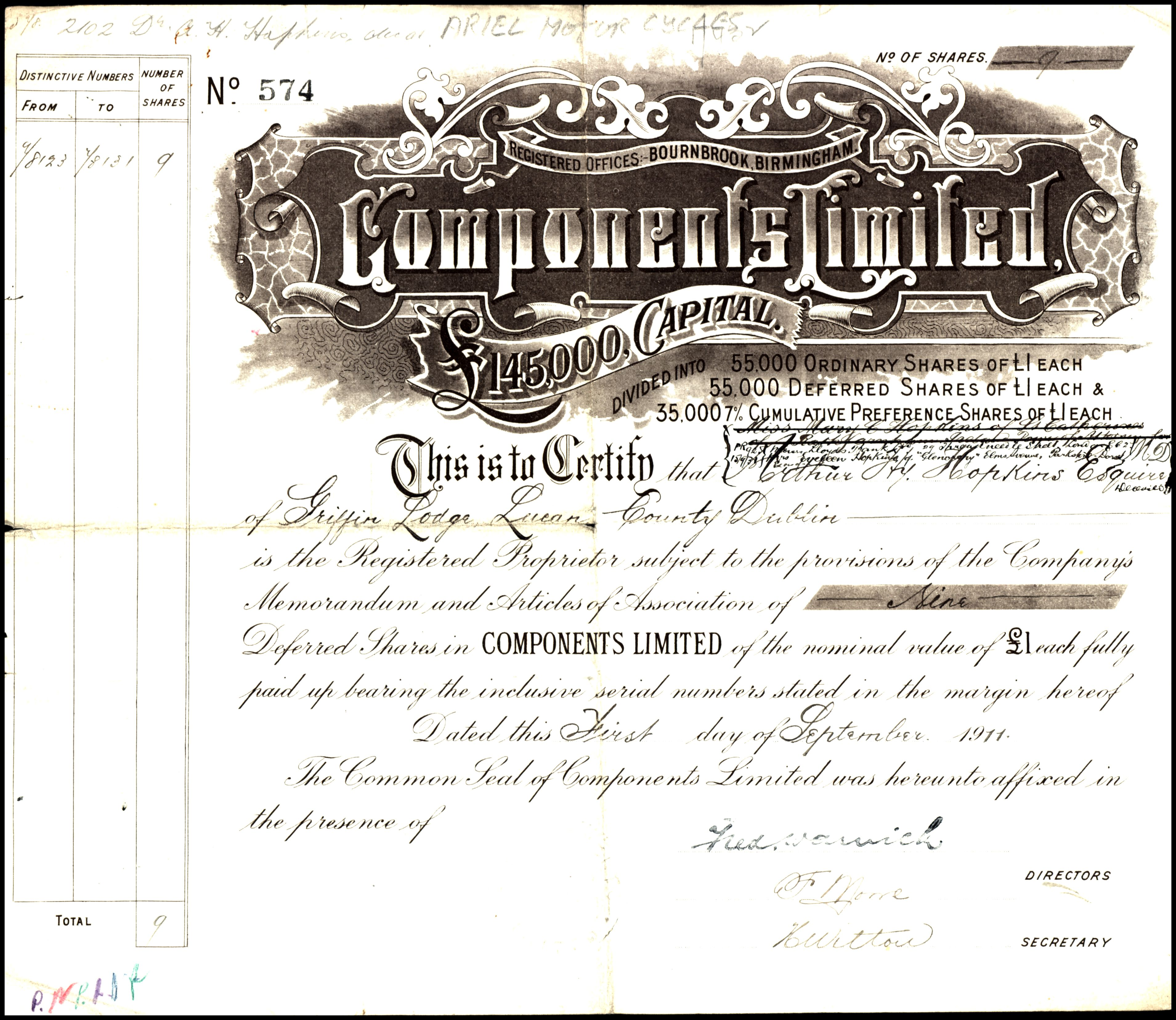
Deferred share of Components Ltd, issued 1. September 1911

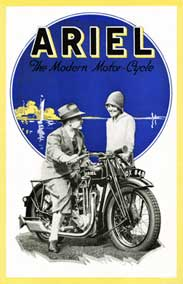
1928 Ariel brochure

In 1902, Ariel produced its first motorcycle, which had a Kerry engine with a magneto ignition and a float carburettor. That year, Ariel was taken over by Components Ltd, owned by Charles Sangster. Sangster built a three-speed, two-stroke motorcycle sold as the "Arielette", but he stopped production on the outbreak of the first world war.

In 1918, Sangster's son Jack began managing the Ariel division of Components Ltd and developed a successful motorcycle with a 4 hp White and Poppe engine. Jack increased the range of motorcycles to include 586 cc and 992 cc machines. A range of motorcycles was made until 1926 with engines bought in or assembled to others' designs, until a new designer, Val Page, joined Ariel from JAP. That year Page created a pair of new engines which used many existing motorcycle parts, then redesigned the motorcycle for 1927. These new models are known as Black Ariels (1926–1930) and were the basis on which all Ariel four-stroke singles were based until their demise in 1959 (except the LH Colt of the mid-1950s). During the Black Ariel period, the Ariel horse logo came into being, as did the slogan 'The Modern Motor Cycle'.

=== Ariel Motors ===
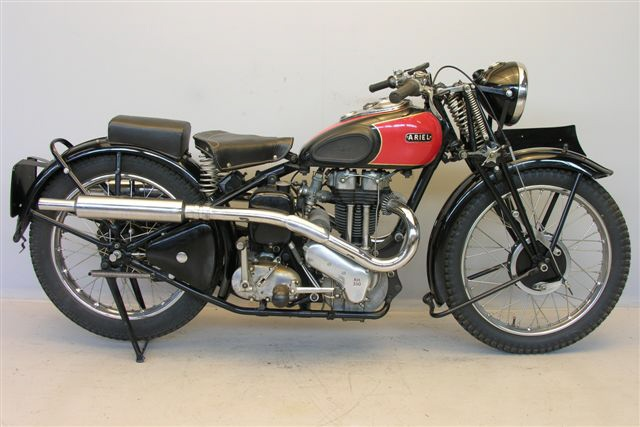
1938 Ariel 350 cc Red Hunter

Components Ltd. suffered several financial crises including spells in receivership in 1911 and in the early 1930s. In 1932, Components Ltd went bankrupt, and Jack Sangster, Charles Sangster's son, bought the Ariel subsidiary from the receivers at a bargain price. The company was renamed Ariel Motors (J.S.) Ltd, and promptly resumed production. A new factory was set up at Selly Oak in Birmingham. One of their first bikes was the Ariel Square Four, designed by Edward Turner, followed by the Ariel Red Hunter. The Red Hunter was a success, and enabled Ariel to purchase Triumph.

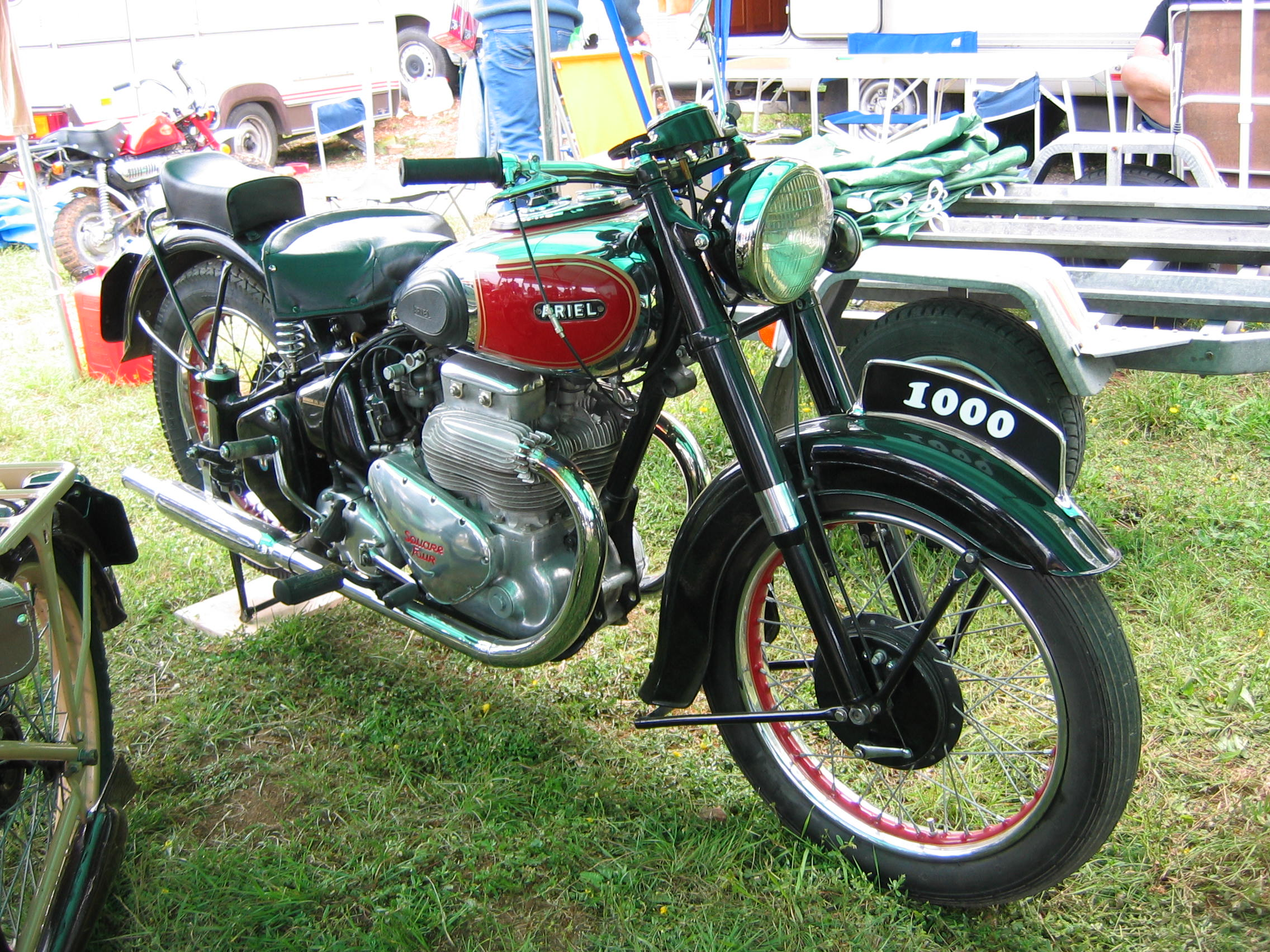
Ariel 1,000 Square Four

The Ariel Square Four, with a 500 cc engine designed by Edward Turner, was launched for the 1931 season. Around this time the company went into receivership and then a new company was formed. The Square Four displacement was increased to 600cc. Throughout their history, the Square Fours had overheating problems with the rear cylinders which resulted in distorted heads. A redesign in 1937 resulted in a 995 cc OHV version designated the 4G.

From 1939, Anstey-link plunger rear suspension was an option. It was still available when production restarted in 1946, with a telescopic front fork superseding the girder fork.

During the Second World War the Ariel factory was turned over to military production, including the Ariel W/NG 350 army motorcycle based on the civilian NG model but with higher ground clearance frame inspired by that used successfully by Fred Povey in the ISDT.

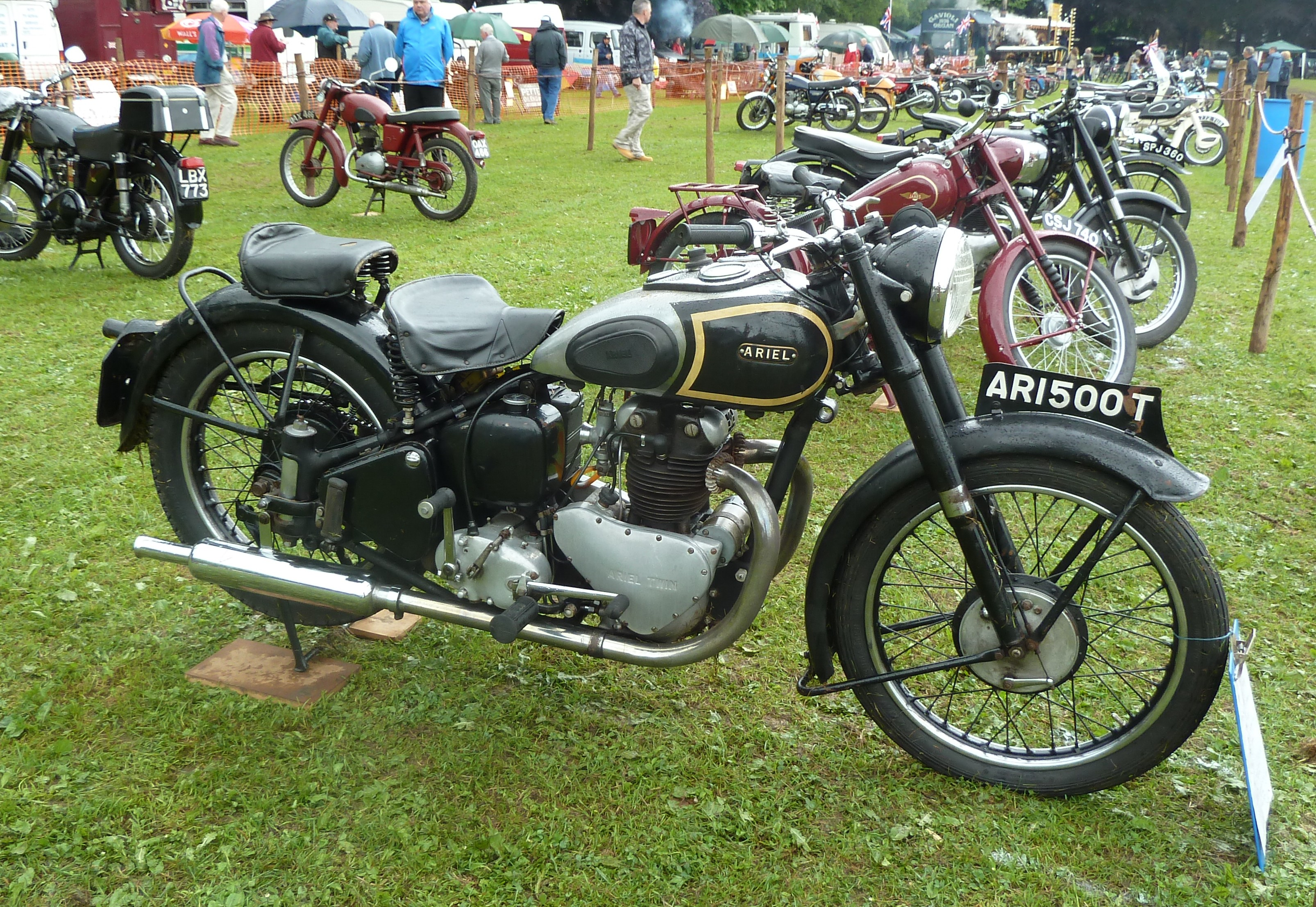
Early Ariel KG or KH twin, with Anstey-link plunger rear suspension

In 1948 Ariel introduced a 500cc parallel-twin engine, following the trend that Triumph Engineering set with the Speed Twin and Tiger 100. Ariel offered the twin in two models: the low-tuned KG and slightly higher-tuned KH.

In 1949 Ariel revised the Mark 1 Square Four engine to include a cast aluminium cylinder block and head in place of the cast iron components previously used, in an effort to promote cooling. With the lower weight the bike was a 90 mph (140 km/h) plus machine.

=== BSA ===
In 1951 Jack Sangster sold Ariel and Triumph (which Ariel bought in 1936) to the Birmingham Small Arms Company group (BSA) and joined the BSA board. In 1954 Ariel launched the KHA, which was a high-performance version of the KH with an aluminium alloy cylinder head. Also in 1954, Ariel launched the FH, a 650cc parallel twin to compete with the Triumph Thunderbird. However, instead of enlarging the KH engine, Ariel used the BSA A10 engine, with a different timing cover to badge-engineer it as an Ariel. Reliable and capable of 100 miles per hour (160 km/h), the FH proved popular with sidecar enthusiasts. The models were later given names. The FH was named the Huntmaster, and the KH was named the Fieldmaster.

By 1956, Sangster was voted in as the new chairman, defeating incumbent Sir Bernard Docker 6 to 3. Sangster promptly made Edward Turner head of the automotive division, which then included Ariel, Triumph, and BSA motorcycles, as well as Daimler and Carbodies (the manufacturer of London Taxicabs).

In 1953 the Mark 2 Square Four was given a redesigned cylinder head, making it capable of 100 mph (160 km/h).

The Red Hunter formed the basis for Sammy Miller's 1955 trials motorcycle which proved very successful in competition.

=== Two-strokes and demise ===
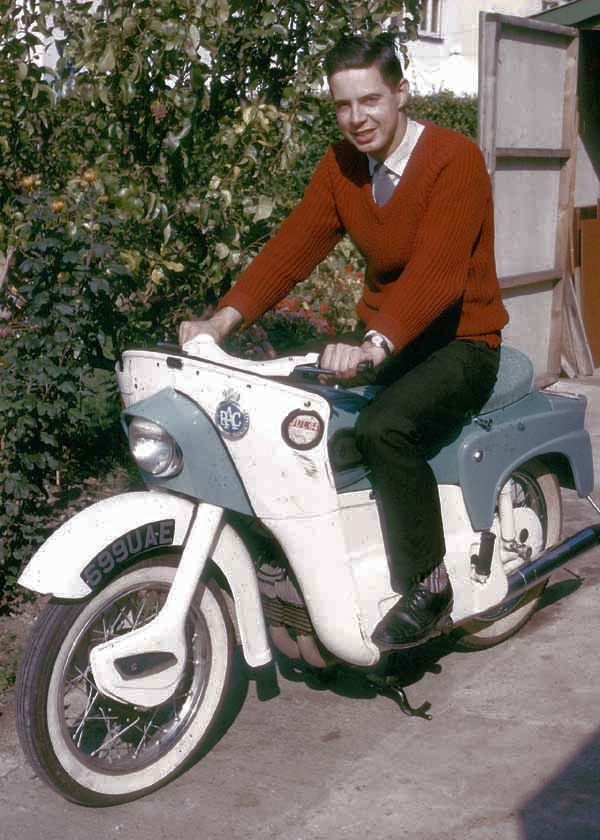
250 cc Ariel Leader

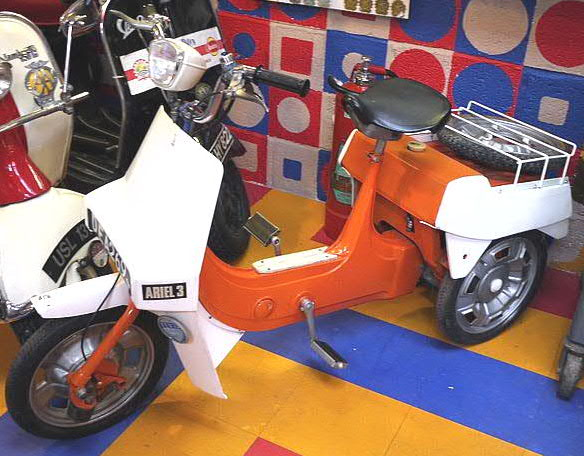
Ariel 3, a 49 cc tilting trike

In 1959, Ariel dropped its four-stroke engines and produced the Ariel Leader, a fully enclosed 250 cc two-stroke with a fully faired body from the headlamp aft. The Leader aimed to combine the benefits of the motorcycle with the advantages of a scooter. Ariel also made the Arrow, a more open version of the Leader which kept the Leader's enclosed chain case and deep mudguards. Both models were an unsuccessful attempt to compete with new Japanese imports.

BSA closed the Ariel factory at Selly Oak in 1962 and moved production of the Leader and the Arrow to the BSA factory at Small Heath. Production of the 50 cc Pixie began in 1963.

In 1965, Ariel produced its last motorcycle, the Arrow 200 with capacity reduced to 200 cc introduced earlier during 1964 to qualify for lower UK rider insurance. Ariel motorcycles ceased production in 1967.

=== Later use of the Ariel name ===
In 1970, parent company BSA produced the Ariel 3, a 49 cc automatic tricycle with a coupling between the front and rear frame sections allowing banking when cornering. The front half was hinged to the rear and could tilt into corners while keeping all three wheels on the ground. The design was licensed from George Wallis, of G.L.Wallis & Son, who had patented it in 1966. A small museum dedicated to the trike has been established in Bristol, England.

Following the failure of the Ariel 3, the design was licensed to Honda which produced it as the Honda Gyro.

In 1999 a new company was formed using the old 'Ariel' name. Initially, the Ariel Motor Company made only one model, the Atom, a high performance, minimalistic 2-seat road-legal sports car, followed by a large-capacity motorcycle named Ariel Ace.

=== Gallery ===
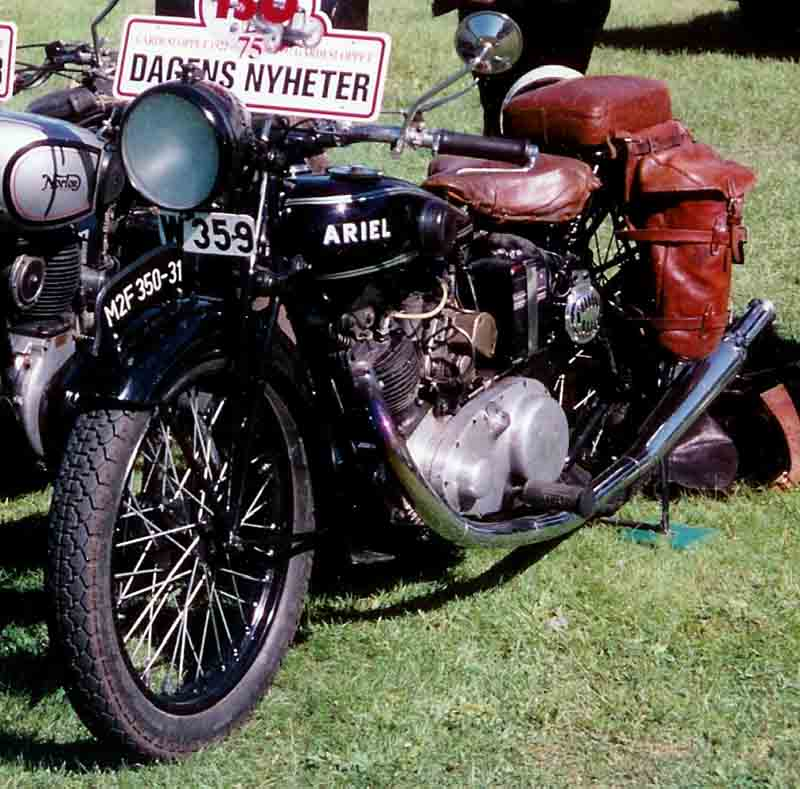
1931 Ariel M2F 350 cc

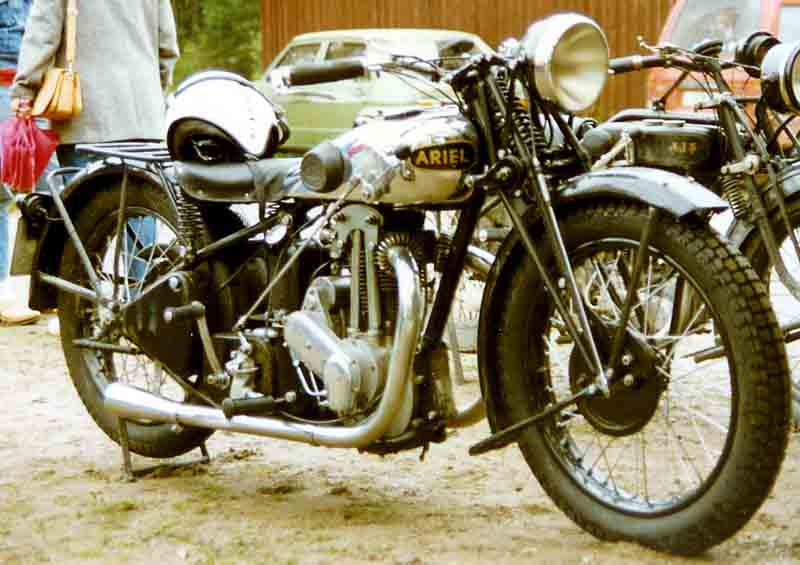
1932 Ariel Red Hunter

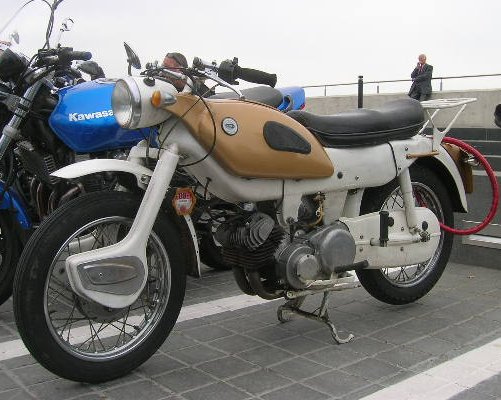
Ariel Golden Arrow

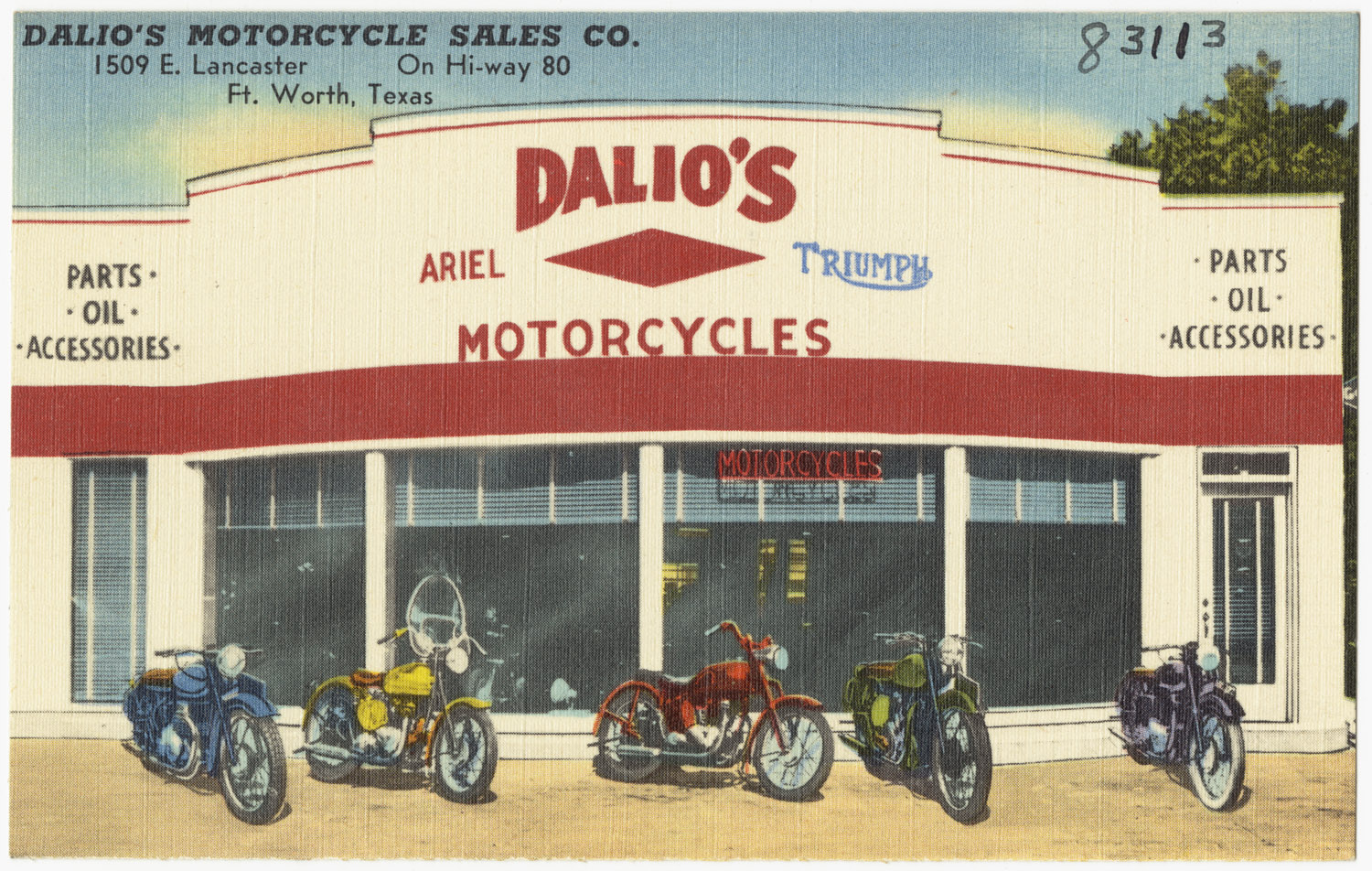
Ariel and Triumph dealer in Texas, ca. 1930–1945

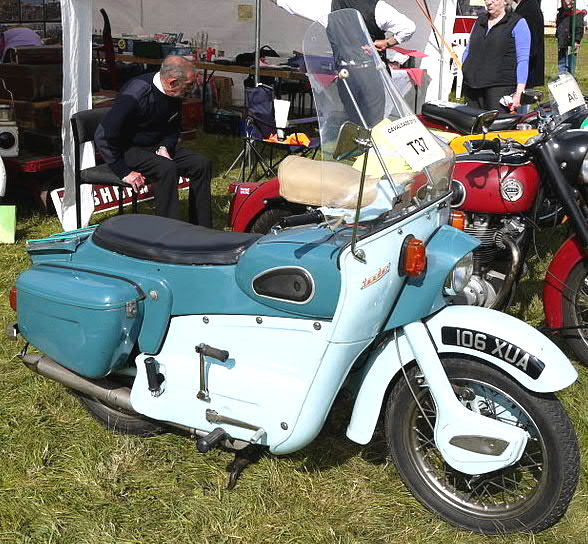
Leader with optional panniers and indicators

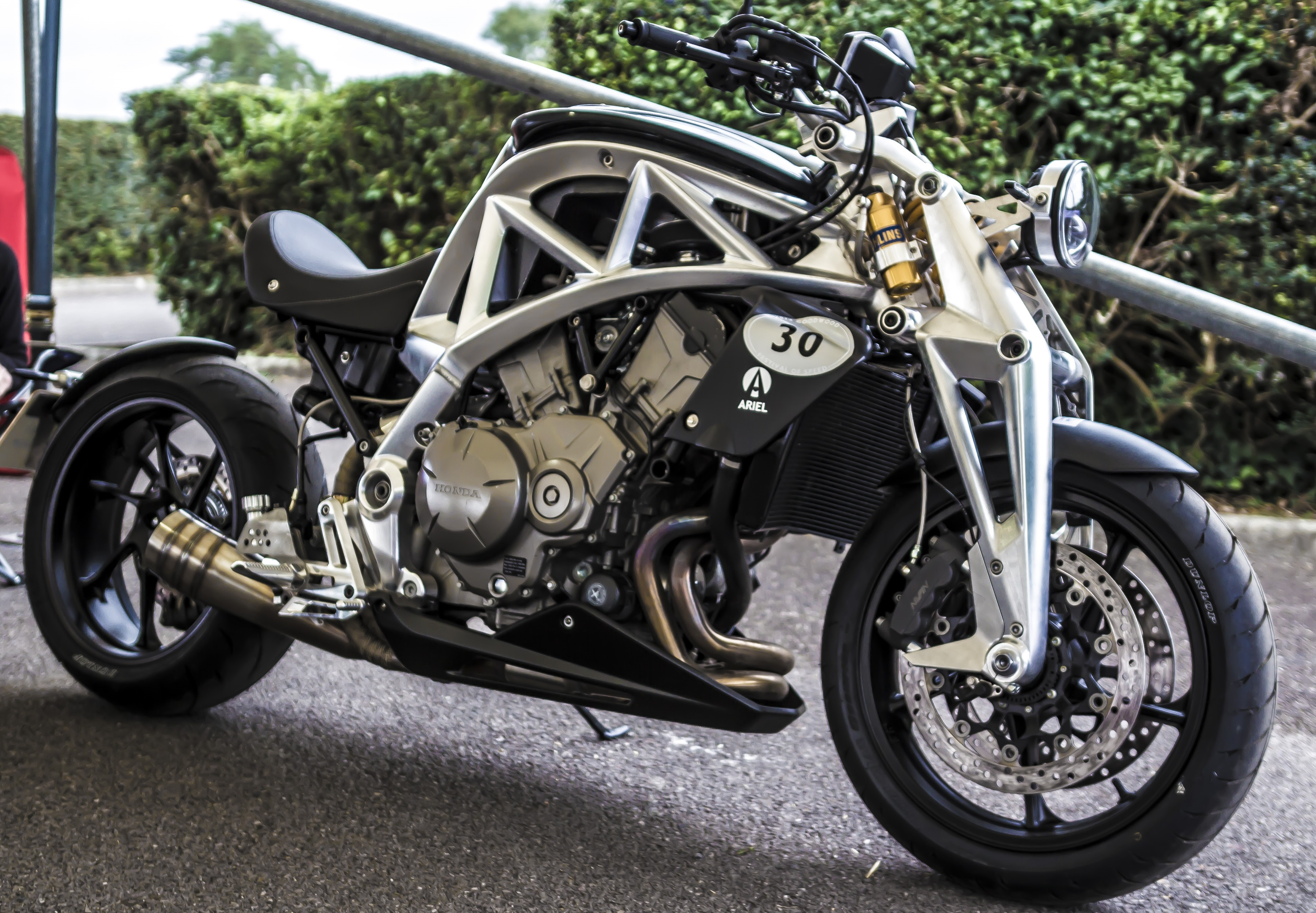
2014 Ariel Ace

=== Famous models ===
- Models A - G
- VCH
- KHA
- Cyclone (model owned by Buddy Holly)
- Trials HT5
- Trials HT3
- Scrambles HS (Mk1,11,111)

== Cars ==
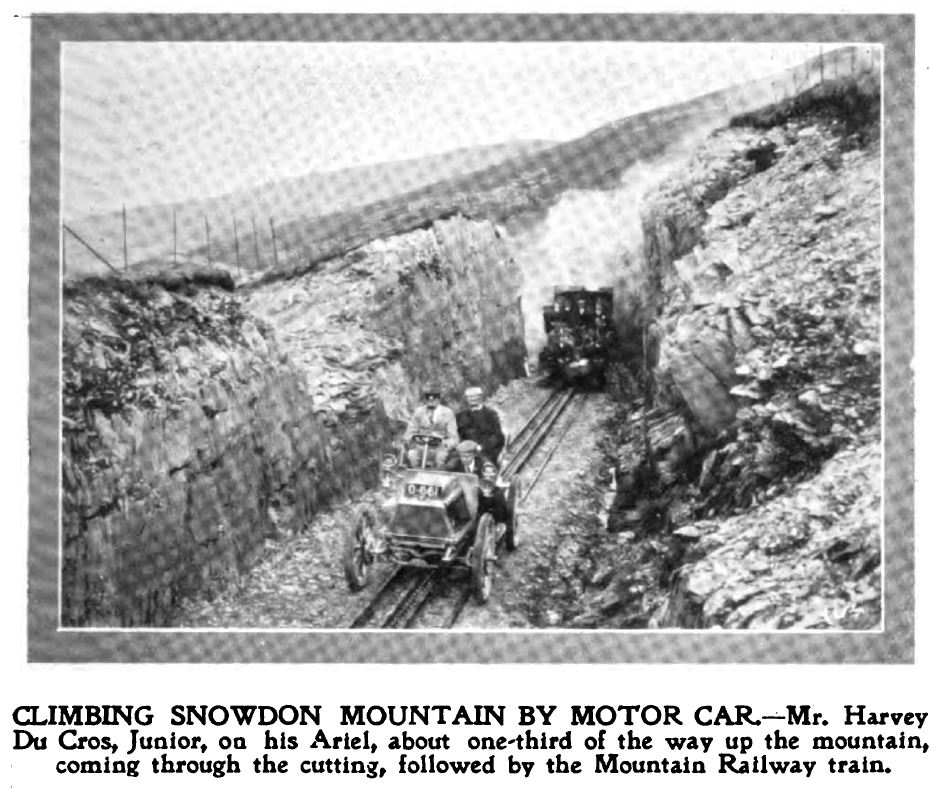
A 15HP Ariel Car ascending Snowdon in 1904

Cars were produced over two periods: from 1902 to 1915, and again from 1922 to 1925. The first proper Ariel car was a 10 hp (7.5 kW) twin-cylinder car produced in 1902. In 1903 its first four-cylinder was a 15/19 model. (Note: "15/19" meant 15 RAC horsepower, about 19 horsepower (14 kW) actually being delivered) Both these vehicles had a leather cone clutch that was entirely separate from the flywheel. In 1904 the 15HP car had the distinction of being the first motor car to ascend Snowdon, albeit using the mountain railway trackbed which has long stretches of 1 in 5 gradient. In early 1904, Ariel began production of a six-cylinder model built on a seemingly inadequate tubular steel chassis.

An entirely new range was announced at the end of 1905; called the 'Ariel-Simplex', these cars were Mercedes-inspired four-cylinder designs of 15 hp and 25/30 hp and a six of 35/40 hp. In 1907–1908 the company began production of their 50/60 hp six, which offered a 15.9-litre engine for a chassis price of £950. In 1907 Ariel sold its Birmingham factory to the French Lorraine-Dietrich company, who wanted to enter the British market; Ariel cars were thereafter assembled at the Coventry Ordnance Works, a branch of Cammell Laird. The arrangement with Lorraine-Dietrich was cancelled in 1910. Production of a 1.3-litre light car ended with the outbreak of World War I.

Ariel resumed making motor cars in 1922 when it launched the Ariel Nine light car. The Nine had a 997 cc water-cooled side-valve flat twin engine with "square" dimensions of 85 mm bore and 85 mm stroke made by A Harper Sons & Bean, Ltd of Dudley. The Nine was designed by Jack Sangster, the son of Ariel's owner, who had designed the similar, but air-cooled, twin-cylinder Rover 8 when he worked for Rover.

The Nine was capable of 55 mph (89 km/h) and about 700 were made. However, the engine was vibratory and noisy, so in 1924 Ariel discontinued the model and replaced it with the 10 hp (RAC) car. (Note: By this time, RAC horsepower was a tax formula and was unrelated to the output of the engine.)

The "Ten" had a 1097 cc four-cylinder Q-Type engine made by the Swift Motor Company. Unlike the Nine it was a long-stroke engine, with a bore of only 60 mm and stroke of 97 mm. The Ten had a gearbox combined with the rear axle. The car was advertised at £180 for the chassis, and about 250 were made. In 1925 Ariel discontinued car production to concentrate on motorcycles.

== Car Models ==
Model	Period	Cylinders	Bore x Stroke	Displacement	Performance	Wheelbase
28/38 HP	1906-1907	4 Cyl.	114 mm x 140 mm	348.8 cu in (5,716 cc)	34.49 hp (26 kW)	3,048 mm (120.0 in)
30/40 HP	1906	4 Cyl.	126 mm x 140 mm	426.1 cu in (6,983 cc)	40.1 hp (30 kW)	3,048 mm (120.0 in)
35/45 HP (4)	1906	4 Cyl.	140 mm x 140 mm	526.1 cu in (8,621 cc)	46.7 hp (35 kW)	3,048 mm (120.0 in)
35/45 HP (6)	1907	6 Cyl.	114 mm x 140 mm	523.2 cu in (8,574 cc)	51.56 hp (38 kW)	3,429 mm (135.0 in)
40/50 HP	1906-1908	6 Cyl.	126 mm x 140 mm	639.2 cu in (10,474 cc)	53.82 hp (40 kW)	3,429 mm (135.0 in)
50/60 HP	1906-1908	6 Cyl.	140 mm x 140 mm	789.1 cu in (12,931 cc)	66.16 hp (49 kW)	3,658 mm (144.0 in)

== See also ==
- List of car manufacturers of the United Kingdom
