= Cleveland CycleWerks =

US motorcycle manufacturer

Coordinates: 41.487°N 81.729°W

- Company type: Private
- Industry: Motor vehicle design and manufacturing
- Founded: 2009
- Founder: Scott Colosimo
- Headquarters: Cleveland, Ohio, US
- Area served: Canada, Japan, South Africa, Switzerland, US
- Products: Motorcycles, motorcycle parts
- Revenue: $1,872,000 (2011)
- Number of employees: 4
- Website: clevelandcyclewerks.com

Cleveland CycleWerks is a privately held motorcycle manufacturer that designs and assembles small displacement retro style café racers and bobbers at its headquarters in Cleveland, Ohio, relying on offshore manufacturing in China by CPI Motor Company of Taiwan for most components, including frames and the Honda-derived engine used on all models.

The company was founded by Scott Colosimo, Jarrod Streng, and Curtis Ray in 2009, who sought partner factories in China after being turned away by US parts suppliers, and government seed money sources. The company aims to fill a gap in the motorcycle marketplace for inexpensive yet stylish motorcycles that riders find technologically accessible, easing customization and maintenance.

== Scott Colosimo ==
Scott Colosimo grew up in Parma, Ohio, where he began making custom cars and motorcycles in his parents' garage when he was 15 years old. He attended the Cleveland Institute of Art, graduating in 2004 with a degree in industrial design. His first job after graduating from college was at Johnson Controls, where his "quest for perfection" was detrimental; Colosimo said "I couldn't just draw a door handle on a car when the whole car was screwed up. I'd want to draw the door and the seats and the dashboard, and then fix the whole company. It always got me into trouble when I worked for someone else."

After Johnson Controls, Colosimo worked as a designer for Dirt Devil, together with his friend Jarrod Streng. While employed by the vacuum cleaner company, Colosimo built custom motorcycle parts surreptitiously after hours in the company facility, discovering that he could build a café racer style custom bike that attracted as many admirers as a "$30,000 Harley" for one tenth the cost.

After Colosimo and Streng were laid off from Dirt Devil, they continued to pursue their interest in bikes. In 2008, Colosimo became an adjunct professor at CIA, teaching transportation design.

=== Customization ===
Colosimo's personal motorcycle is a custom motorcycle: a hardtail bobber he built himself, based on a 1954 BSA M21, a 63 mph (101 km/h) workhorse of a motorcycle with a "big, lazy" 591 cc (36.1 cu in) a single cylinder side valve engine, developed from BSA's World War II M20 military service bike. He had bought the 60-year-old machine sight unseen on eBay, and then rebuilt the unsafe and worn out bike, having to repair previous ill-conceived "chops", or customizations, of the frame. He removed the rear suspension, making it a hardtail, and installed 19-inch (480 mm) Yamaha XS 650 wheels, a custom exhaust, forks from a Suzuki GSX-R1000, front disc brake rotors from a Suzuki GSX-R600 and a rear rotor from a Suzuki GSX-R750. The use of enormous sport bike brakes, designed to stop motorcycles with more than ten times the horsepower, and three times the top speed, was intended, Colosimo said, to create a visual "contradiction", explaining that, "you do a double-take to see what kind of bike sits behind the massive rotors. Let's just say it only takes one finger to stop this bike!" Colosimo said his custom M21, with nicks and scrapes, and some crash damage, is meant to be not only admired, to be ridden, and "ridden hard."

== Founding ==
Around 2008 and 2009, after Colosimo and Streng found themselves unemployed, they decided to start a motorcycle manufacturer. Working out of a friend's garage in Ashland, Ohio, they pooled their money, $15,000, and used various stock parts to make a 250 cc prototype in a Mansfield, Ohio factory. They ran into "roadblocks" from investors, government agencies, and local organizations in Cleveland who told them their enterprise would fail. Colosimo said they went after "millions in grants" from the US government, hoping for money aimed at assisting development of green vehicles, "Since we're using small displacement engines, we're getting close to 100mpg", but the familiar technology of the ubiquitous Honda engine design did not qualify for seed money, since it was not, "ultra-green technology that no one's heard of, some sort of wizardry." One of the design goals was technological simplicity, enabling the rider to maintain and customize his or her own bike, Colosimo saying, "they're nice and simple and you can take them apart, you can understand them."

Similarly, US parts manufacturers initially expressed interest in filling Cleveland CycleWerks' orders until they found out the parts were for a motorcycle, and then backed out, telling Colosimo, "Well, is this for motorcycles? We can't do parts for motorcycles, it's too risky" or citing insurance policy restrictions preventing them from making motorcycle parts. Suppliers also reacted to Colosimo's youthful appearance, telling him, "you look like you're 16" and "where's your dad?" After six months of frustration Streng and Colosimo went on what he called "a short world trip" to investigate manufacturing outside the US.

When Curtis Ray invested in the new company, he brought with him a familiarity with manufacturing in China, having relationships with factories there and knowing a "trusted facility" where production could begin. Colosimo spent six months in China developing the manufacturing process and quality control. Aware of the hostility to Chinese imports that undercut the prices of US goods, Colosimo said they could claim that their motorcycles are Made in USA, "but that'd be bullshit. Just because we bolt a few parts on doesn't make it true." He alludes to US electric motorcycle makers whose production is in Taiwan and China, yet they advertise their bikes as US made because final assembly, like attaching the tires and handlebars, is in the US. For 2010, "a building year", Cleveland CycleWerk's aimed at 1,000 to 3,000 in US sales as they tested small production runs, stocked parts supplies and arranged distributors and dealers. Their goal had been to offer six motorcycle models in 2011, rather than just two, with a target of selling 12,000 motorcycles in the US that year.

Colosimo said the bikes are aimed at new, first time motorcycle riders, as well as finding other markets. The approximately US$3,000 Cleveland CycleWerks bikes fill a gap in the marketplace between US$8,000 new motorcycles which are priced too high for many potential customers, and used motorcycles from the 1990s which lack a warranty and dealer support. Another market is female riders, Colosimo citing examples of husbands and boyfriends who purchased a Harley-Davidson Sportster for their wives and girlfriends to ride, only to find those bikes were too large and heavy for them. Cleveland CycleWerks said that more than 30% of the buyers of its Heist model are women, despite industry data showing women make up only 11% of motorcycle buyers overall. The low 24-inch (61 cm) seat height and light weight are given as reasons for its attractiveness to women. Another unanticipated segment Colosimo has found is the "step-down market", that is, riders of "bagger" cruisers costing $15,000 adorned with "$30,000 in chrome" who complain "I'm afraid I'm going to scratch it", and so buy a Heist as "something they can ride to the bar without worrying about someone dinging it or scratching it."

== Products ==
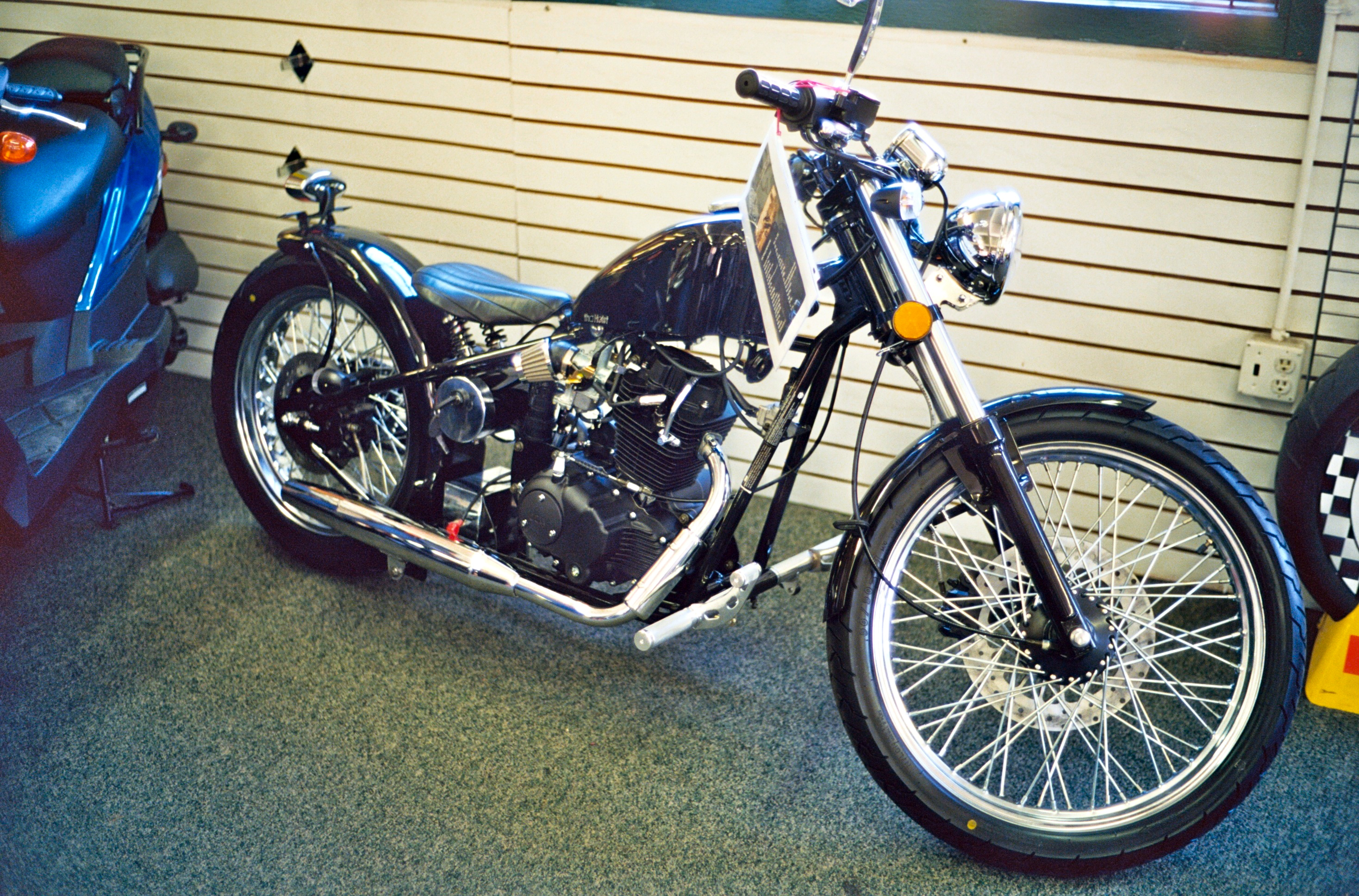
Tha Heist hardtail bobber.

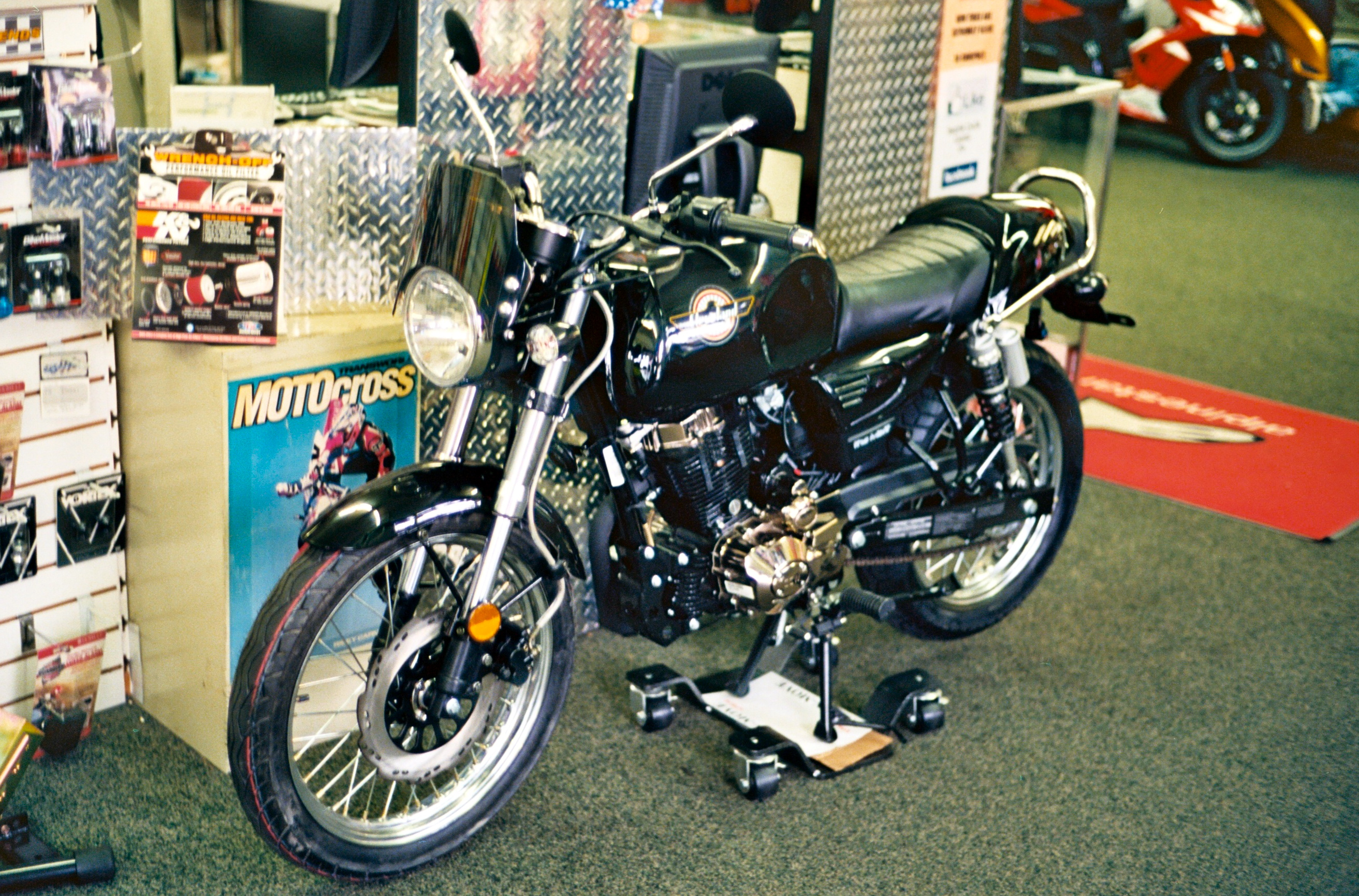
Tha Misfit café racer.

Cleveland CycleWerks debuted their first motorcycle, tha Heist, a 272-pound (123 kg) dry weight hardtail bobber, in February 2010 at the Indianapolis Dealer Expo. Their second motorcycle is tha Misfit, café racer. Both motorcycles have a 12.5 horsepower (9.3 kW) 229 cc (14.0 cu in) OHV single cylinder engine made by Lifan Group, using an engine design derived from Honda's CG series. The definite article "the" is stylized as "tha" in the model names.

== Announced plans ==
In 2011, Cleveland CycleWerks announced that their next model would be a supermoto-style dual-sport called Tha Hooligun. The company has been reported to be renovating a 60,000-square-foot (5,600 m^{2}) factory near Cleveland's Gordon Square for its US headquarters and for motorcycle production starting in late 2012. In 2016, Colosimo said they would be moving to assembling more motorcycles in the US, beginning, "on a limited basis for the next 12 months. We will have US EPA and US manufacturing approvals in place by 2017." The goal would be to move at least some motorcycle manufacturing from China to the US, while continuing some overseas production in order to keep prices down.
