= List of vehicles at the National Motor Museum, Beaulieu =

List of exhibits at the National Motor Museum, Beaulieu, Hampshire, UK.

Make	Model	Year	Notes
ABC	Skootamota	1920	
AC	Model 70	1976	
AC	Shelby Cobra	1965	
Acrostar	BD-5J Jet	1983	
AEC	Regent MkIII RT Double Decker Bus	1950	
AJS	7R	1958	
AJS	Model 16M	1946	
Albion	A14	1914	
Allard	Dragster 5.8	1960	
Allard	J2	1950	
Alvis	Speed 25	1937	
AMC	Hornet	1974	
Argyll	15/30 hp	1913	
Ariel	Chopper	1954	
Ariel	Leader	1959	
Ariel	Square Four	1931	
Ariel	Tricycle	1898	
Ascot–Pullin	Utility De Luxe	1930	
Aston Martin	1.5‑litre	1922	
Aston Martin	DB5	1963	
Aston Martin	DB5	1964	
Aston Martin	DBS	2008	
Aston Martin	DBS	2006	
Aston Martin	DBS Stunt Car	2006	
Aston Martin	DBS with continuity damage	2008	
Aston Martin	V12 Vanquish	2002	
Aston Martin	V8 Volante	1984	
ATCO	Trainer	1939	
Auburn	851	1935	
Audi	Quattro A2 Rally Car	1983	
Austin	20 hp Breakdown Truck	1926	
Austin	A40 Farina	1966	
Austin	A40 Somerset	1953	
Austin	A90 Atlantic	1952	
Austin	Clifton 12/4	1928	
Austin Healey	100M	1956	
Austin	Mini Cooper S Downton	1963	
Austin	Mini Seven	1959	
Austin	Seven Swallow	1932	
Austin	Seven Tourer	1928	
Austin	Seven Tourer	1923	
BAT	5/6 hp With Sidecar	1913	
Bath-O-Sub		1971	
Bayliss Thomas		1928	
Bean	Short 14	1928	
Bedford	Cadbury Crème Egg	1989	
Bell-Textron	Jet Pack	2002	
Benelli	750 Sei	1978	
Benelli	Adiva Scooter		
Bentley	4.5 Litre Supercharged	1930	
Benz	(Replica)	1886	
Benz	Velo	1898	
Bluebird CN7		1961	
BMW	750iL	1997	
BMW	Isetta 300 Super Plus	1962	
BMW	R1200C	1997	
BMW	R50 With Steib Sidecar	1957	
BMW	Z8	1999	
Bolster	Special Bloody Mary	1929	
Bombardier	MX Z-Rev Ski-Doo	2002	
BRM	1.5 litre V16 Type 15 MkI	1950	
Brockhouse	Corgi Scooter	1949	
Brough	Superior 11.50 Special Combination	1936	
Brush	Pony	1947	
BSA	B25 2 hp	1925	
BSA	Bantam D1	1949	
BSA	M21	1960	
BSA	S28 OHV	1928	
BSA	Victor Grand Prix Works Scrambler	1967	
Bugatti	Type 15	1910	
Bugatti	Type 35	1924	
Burial-At-Sea	Bed	1967	
Cadillac	Model A	1903	
Cagiva	600 W16	1995	
Calcott	11.9 hp	1923	
Caterham	SP/300R	2011	
Cello Case	Sled	1985	
Chevrolet	Aveo	2012	
Chitty Chitty Bang Bang	Transforming Chitty		
Citroën	2CV	1981	
Citroën	2CV6 Special	1986	
Citroën	Xsara WRC	2005	
Columbia	Electric	1901	
Commer	Auto-Sleeper	1964	
Connaught	B-Type	1955	
Cooper	500 MkIII	1949	
Cord	810 Westchester Sedan	1937	
Coventry	Eagle B33	1926	
Crocodile	Mini-Sub	1983	
Crossley Burney	Streamline	1934	
Daimler	22 hp	1903	
Daimler	Bottle Lorry	1924	
Daimler	12 hp	1899	
Daimler	Cannstatt	1898	
Damon Hill's Williams - Renault	FW18	1996	
Datsun	Type 14 Saloon	1935	
De Dietrich	24 hp	1903	
De Dion-Bouton	Model Q 6 hp	1904	
De Dion-Bouton	Model Q 6 hp	1903	
DeLorean Motor Company	DeLorean	1981	
Del Boy's Reliant Regal		1971	
Dixon-Bate	Trailer	1932	
Douglas	Model R	1913	
Douglas	Vespa 152/L2	1959	
Douglas	With Dixon Banking Sidecar	1923	
Ducati	998R	2002	
Durkopp	Diana	1957	
Eccles	Caravan	1926	
Elstar	Jap Grasstrack	1948	
Fairey	Marine Huntress Speedboat	1962	
Ferrari	Dino 246 GT	1974	
Ferrari	F310 V10 Replica	1996	Michael Schumacher's Ferrari
Fiat	3.5 hp	1899	
Fiat	Tipo Zero	1913	
Ford	Anglia 105E ‘Flying Car’	1966	
Ford	Anglia E494A	1949	
Ford	Capri 1600L	1971	
Ford	Consul Convertible MkI	1955	
Ford	Consul Cortina MkI	1963	
Ford	Escort RS Rally Car	1981	
Ford	Ka	2008	
Ford	Model T	1914	
Ford	Model T Van	1914	
Ford	Model Y	1937	
Ford	Mustang Mach 1	1971	
Ford	Thunderbird	2002	
Ford	V8 Utility	1937	
Ford Sierra	RS Cosworth	1986	
Frazer Nash	Colmore	1932	
Glastron	Carlson CV-23HT	1978	
Glastron	GT-150	1973	
Gobron-Brillié	Fire Engine	1907	
Golden Arrow		1929	
Graham Hill's Lotus	49 R3	1967	
Grégoire	12CV	1905	
Greeves	Hawkstone	1961	
Grenville	Steam Carriage	1875	
Harley-Davidson	11 hp	1915	
Harley-Davidson	42 WLC	1942	
Harrods	Electric Van	1939	
Healey	Elliot 2.4 litre	1947	
Hillman	Imp De Luxe Saloon	1963	
Hillman	Minx Magnificent	1938	
Hispano-Suiza	Alfonso XIII	1912	
Honda	RC162	1961	
Honda	ATC	1971	
Honda	CB750KO	1970	
Honda	CBR 900 Fireblade	1996	
Honda	Supersport CBX1000	1979	
Humber	8 hp	1909	
Ice Dragster		2002	
Itala	120 hp	1907	Winner of the 1907 Coppa della Velocita driven by Alessandro Cagno. 1/16th scale model.
Jaguar	E-Type 3.8	1962	
Jaguar	XK150 3.8 Litre	1960	
Jaguar	XKR Convertible	2002	
Jensen	Interceptor	1969	
Jowett	Javelin	1949	
Kawasaki	Factory Racer	1975	
Knight		1895	
Lambretta	B Scooter	1948	
Lambretta	LD 150 Scooter	1957	
Lambretta	Li 150	1966	
Land Rover	R.04	1948	
Lotus	78 John Player Special 16	1977	
Lotus	Esprit S1	1977	
Lotus	JPS Europa	1973	
Lotus (Graham Hill's)	49 R3	1967	
M & L	Trials Special	1954	
Matchless	2½hp	1905	
Maxwell	25cwt Charabanc	1922	
McLaren Honda	MP4/4-6	1988	
McLaren Mercedes	MP4/21	2010	
Mercedes	60 hp	1903	
Mercury	Cougar XR7	1969	
MG	M-Type	1930	
MG	PA	1935	
MG	MGC GT	1968	
Mini	Outspan Orange	1972	
Mobil	Pup	1919	
Montesa	Cota 4RT	2008	
Morgan	Aero-Sports	1927	
Morris	1000 Post Office Van	1970	
Morris	8 Series II 4-Door Saloon	1938	
Morris	Cowley Bullnose	1924	
Morris	Minor	1949	
Morris	Minor SV 2 Seater	1931	
Morris	Minor Traveller	1970	
Morris	Mobile Grocery Shop	1933	
Motosacoche	2.5 hp	1913	
Mr Bean's Mini		1979	
Napier	Gordon Bennett	1903	
Ner-A-Car		1921	
Norton	16H	1942	
Norton	30M Manx	1960	
Norton	Commando	1975	
Norton	Dominator	1954	
Norton	Jubilee 250cc	1961	
Norton	Prototype	1953	
Norton	BS	1912	
NSU	3HP	1906	
Osprey Hovercraft		2002	
Parachute		1964	
Parahawk		1999	
Peel	P50	1964	
Pennington	Autocar	1896	
Perks and Birch	Autowheel	1899	
Peter Ustinov's Mercedes	36/220	1928	
Peters	2¾hp	1924	
PIG	(Pipeline Inspection Gauge)	1985	
Pope-Tribune	6 hp	1904	
Q Jet Boat		1999	
Reliant	6cwt Van	1947	
Reliant	Regal MkI	1953	
Renault	11 TXE	1985	
Renault	14/20 hp XB	1906	
Renault	1¾hp	1899	
Riley	1.5 Litre TT Sprite	1936	
Riley	Falcon	1934	
Rolls-Royce	40/50 Phantom I	1925	
Rolls-Royce	Alpine Eagle	1914	
Rolls-Royce	Phantom III	1937	
Rolls-Royce	Phantom VI	1970	
Rolls-Royce	Silver Cloud II	1962	
Rolls-Royce	Silver Shadow II	1977	
Rolls-Royce	Silver Shadow MkI	1968	
Rolls-Royce	Silver Ghost	1909	
Rotrax	Jap Speedway	1950	
Rover	Rover 14	1938	
Rover	P4	1963	
Rover	P6 (2000)	1967	
Royal Caravan		1955	
Royal Enfield	3 hp	1914	
Royal Enfield	Crusader	1959	
Royal Enfield	Experimental	1919	
Royal Enfield	Prototype Army Mod	1945	
Royal Enfield	Quadricycle	1900	
Rudge-Whitworth		1928	
Sinclair	C5	1985	
Skyfleet	S570 model	2006	Model of a fictional aircraft
Solar Flair		1993	
Speargun	Sled	1977	
Standard	Vanguard Saloon	1951	
Sunbeam	16 hp	1914	
Sunbeam	350 hp	1920	
Sunbeam	1000 hp	1927	
Sunbeam	Coupe De L'Auto	1912	
Sunbeam	Cub	1924	
Sunbeam	Standard Model 3	1924	
Sunbeam-Talbot	90	1952	
Surfboard		2002	
Talbot	105	1934	
Top Methanol Dragster		1994	
Tow Sled		1965	
Triumph	2.5HP	1903	
Triumph	3TW	1940	
Triumph	5T Speed Twin	1948	
Triumph	6T Thunderbird	1949	
Triumph	Bonneville T120R	1962	
Triumph	Herald Saloon	1960	
Triumph	Trident T150	1972	
Triumph	TR2	1954	
Williams - Renault (Damon Hill)	FW18	1996	
