= Sno-Jet =

Brand of snowmobile

- Product type: Snowmobile
- Produced by: Sno-Jet (1965-1976); Kawasaki (after)
- Country: Canada
- Introduced: 1965
- Discontinued: 1980

Sno-Jet was a brand of snowmobile first produced in Quebec, Canada in 1965. They quickly proved popular and grew to be a well-selling line of snowmobiles until the early 1970s, helping usher the then-new sport of snowmobiling into Canada and the United States. The Glastron Boat Company acquired Sno-Jet in 1968. The company lost popularity after losing many races to Polaris colts. It was then sold to Kawasaki in 1976, who used the Sno-Jet name until 1980.

== History ==
=== Pre-1965 ===
Maurice Fillion and Paul-Émile Roy tried to get financial aid for their small home-operated fiberglass boat company in Thetford Mines, Quebec, in the winter of 1964. An investor took interest in a small homemade snowmobile Roy had at his home. Fillion and Roy reevaluated their decision to build boats, and instead chose to create a company to manufacture snowmobiles, which were starting to gain popularity through the efforts of companies like Bombardier, Polaris and Arctic Cat. Fillion and Roy formed a partnership with two other investors, Gaétan Théberge and Lionel Pelchat, and Sno-Jet was created.

=== 1965–1968 ===
Sno-Jet produced and sold 25 snowmobiles in 1965, and orders continued to arrive. In less than a year, the demand for its products exceeded its production capacity. The partners expanded the business, adding over 100 new employees, and a mechanical engineer to improve on Roy's original design.

By 1968, they had produced and sold more than 15,000 snowmobiles, with demand continuously increasing. Feeling overburdened, Sno-Jet's owners decided to sell the company to the Glastron Boat Company. Although Glastron moved Sno-Jet's headquarters from Quebec to Minnesota, most of its snowmobiles continued to be made in the company's building in Thetford Mines, Quebec.

=== 1969–1972 ===
Sno-Jet's peak year was 1970, when it produced over 30,000 units, in over 20 models, with various engine styles and other features. By the time the snowmobiling boom of the early 1970s arrived, nearly 100 other snowmobile makers had been formed in North America, and Sno-Jet's sales flattened; but they remained a popular choice due to their reliability and price.

=== 1973–1980 ===
The OPEC Oil Crisis of 1973 hit the snowmobiling market hard. The increase in gas prices followed two poor winters for snow (1971–1973). The reduced demand caused dozens of snowmobile companies, many of which were founded only a short time earlier, to close. Even well-established Sno-Jet was not immune, and by the following year, its production had fallen by nearly 40%. Production continued to dwindle, and Sno-Jet offered fewer models. Despite prices that remained competitive, the snowmobiling market had been broken, and the Glastron Boat Company sold Sno-Jet to Kawasaki in 1976.

Kawasaki wanted to enter the snowmobile market, hoping to expand beyond producing motorcycles, as Yamaha had years before. Although they wanted the Sno-Jet name and its established dealerships, they planned to use their own designs and manufacturing facilities, and had no interest in Sno-Jet's existing facilities or inventory. All of the company's assets were liquidated, and hundreds of employees were terminated, as many were unwilling to move to Kawasaki's headquarters in Nebraska. Only a few design engineers were retained for Kawasaki's new snowmobile enterprise.

Kawasaki used the Sno-Jet name until 1977. It saw only limited success, and was unable to sustain its snowmobile business for much longer. With massive debt due to the market's decline, Kawasaki ceased snowmobile production in 1982.

== Engines ==
In its earliest days of production, Sno-Jet formed a business deal with German engine manufacturer Hirth to supply them with two-stroke engines. Seeking to compete with their Austrian rival Rotax for the rapidly expanding North American snowmobile market, Hirth offered their engines to Sno-Jet for less than Rotax's (whose primary customer was Bombardier). This made Sno-Jet the largest buyer of Hirth engines, and allowed it to keep its production costs low, making Sno-Jets more affordable. Hirth engines were also quite reliable, adding even more credibility to the reputation Sno-Jet was quickly building.

Despite their success with brands like Sno-Jet, Hirth eventually decided to stop producing engines for snowmobiles, citing their growing dependence on the overseas market. The OPEC Oil Crisis of 1973 strengthened their resolve to leave the market, and by 1974 they produced their last two-cycle snowmobile engine. Hirth continues to manufacture two-stroke engines for helicopters and light aircraft.

Needing another engine manufacturer, Sno-Jet turned to Yamaha, which had manufactured motorcycles for many years, and was just expanding into snowmobiling. In 1970, only two years after Yamaha produced their first snowmobile, Sno-Jet began to offer models powered by Yamaha engines. By 1973, Hirth engines were phased out completely, except for a single model in 1974 which used a small surplus supply.

In 1970 Sno-Jet also offered two models using a single-cylinder Sachs 340 cc engine.

== The Thunderjet ==
Sno-Jet holds a particularly notable place in snowmobiling history due to its unique racing models, Thunderjets.

Prior racing models merely utilized larger, more powerful engines in existing snowmobiles. Sno-Jet executives realized they could gain an edge over other manufacturers by creating a purpose-built racing snowmobile, and in 1970 assembled a four-man design team headed by Duane Aho for that purpose.

Their efforts produced the first Thunderjets in 1971, but the prototypes didn't perform well. Testers reported slow acceleration, handling issues at high speeds, and overall poor driving experience. The design team realized that while they knew how to build a snowmobile, they were unfamiliar with snowmobile racing. One tester, a then-unknown racer named Jim Adema, offered some valuable design input, and became part of the Thunderjet design team.

The redesigned Thunderjets produced in 1972 were revolutionary compared to the larger, more powerful racing snowmobiles of the time. They were small, sleek and light, with a low center of gravity. Critics cited their diminutive size, and gave them unflattering nicknames such as "Thunder Chicken". However, they quickly captured the attention of racers and racing fans with their ability to turn tighter and at higher speeds than the larger, heavier models. With lightweight aluminum frames, high-horsepower Yamaha engines and simple aerodynamic design principles, the Thunderjets dominated racing circuits in the early and mid-1970s, winning many awards for racers and Sno-Jet itself.

Racing exclusively for Sno-Jet, Jim Adema became famous. In 1973 and 1974 he won snowmobile racing's most prestigious prize, the Kawartha Cup.

Within a few years, other manufacturers had emulated the Thunderjet's revolutionary compact design. As a result, many of the innovations introduced by the Thunderjet can be seen in snowmobiles produced today.

On December 14, 1975, during a race at Ironwood, Michigan, Jim Adema was killed in an on-track collision. For the first time, he was driving a new Yamaha racing snowmobile rather than a Thunderjet.
