= Pope-Tribune =

Defunct American motor vehicle manufacturer

Pope Manufacturing Company Pope-Tribune
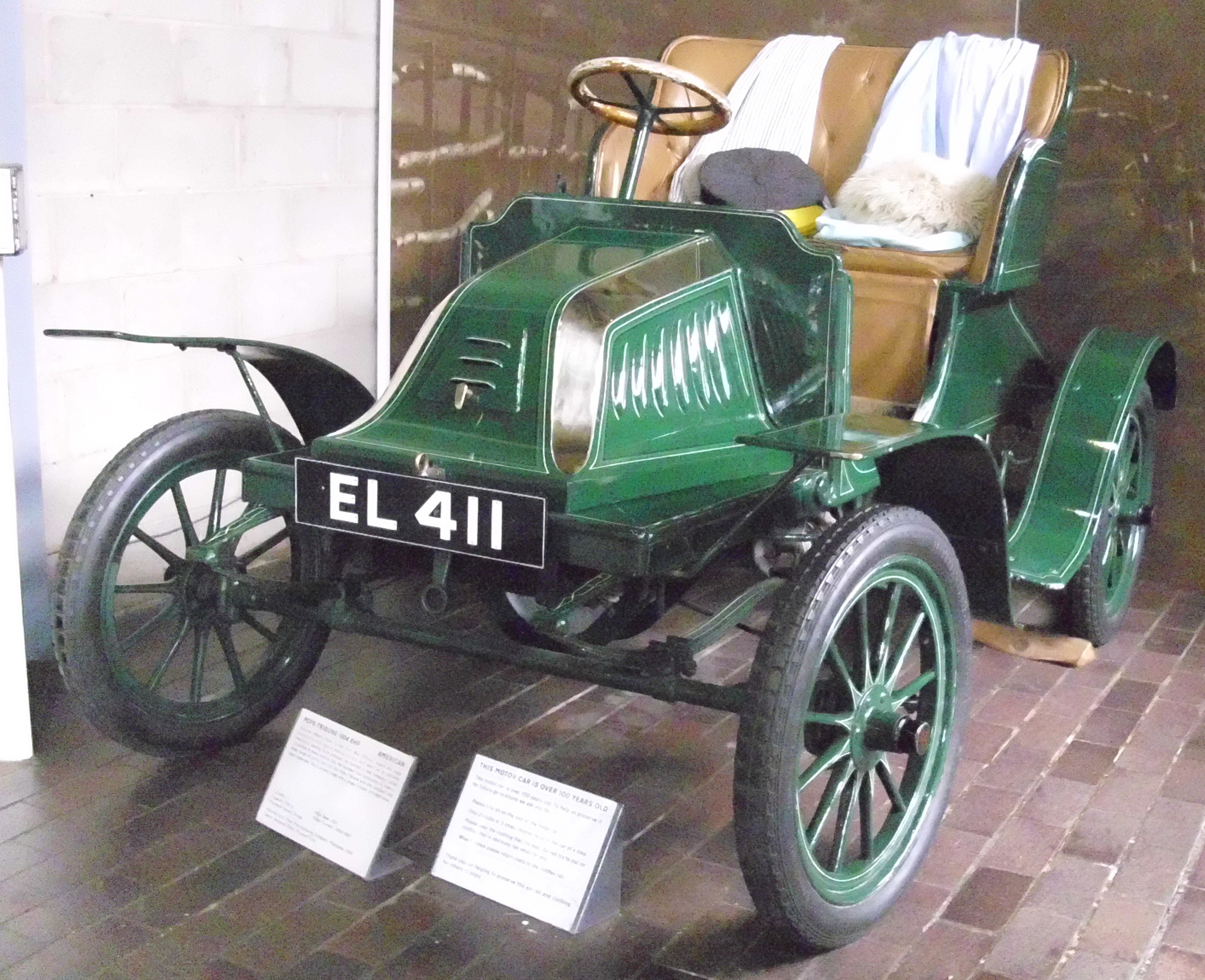
- 1904 Pope-Tribune 6hp Runabout
- Industry: Automotive
- Founded: 1904; 122 years ago
- Defunct: 1908; 118 years ago
- Fate: Closed, factory sold
- Headquarters: Hagerstown, Maryland, United States
- Key people: Harold Pope, Gilbert J. Loomis

Pope-Tribune (1904–1908) was part of the Pope automobile group of companies founded by Colonel Albert Pope manufacturing Brass Era automobiles in Hagerstown, Maryland.

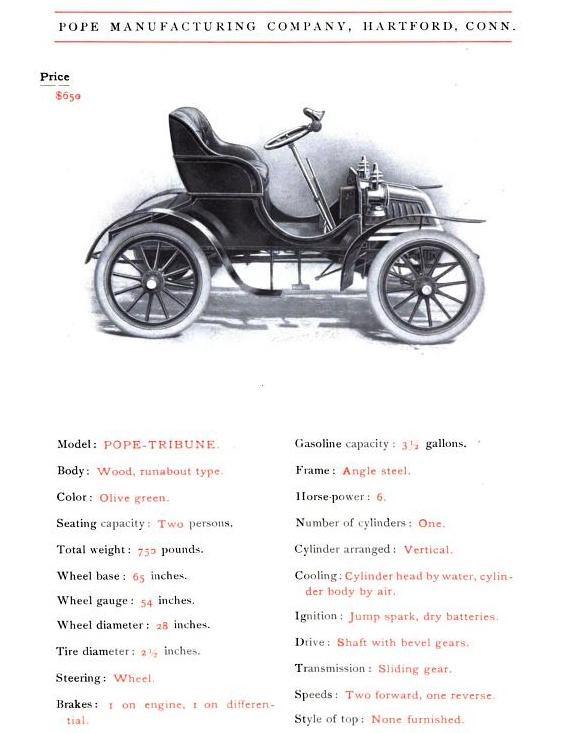
1905 Pope-Tribune Runabout

== History ==
With an initial price of $650 (equivalent to $23,292 in 2025), the Pope-Tribune was the cheapest and smallest model of the Pope automobiles. The factory was set up in the old Crawford bicycle factory and run by Harold E. Pope, the colonel's son.

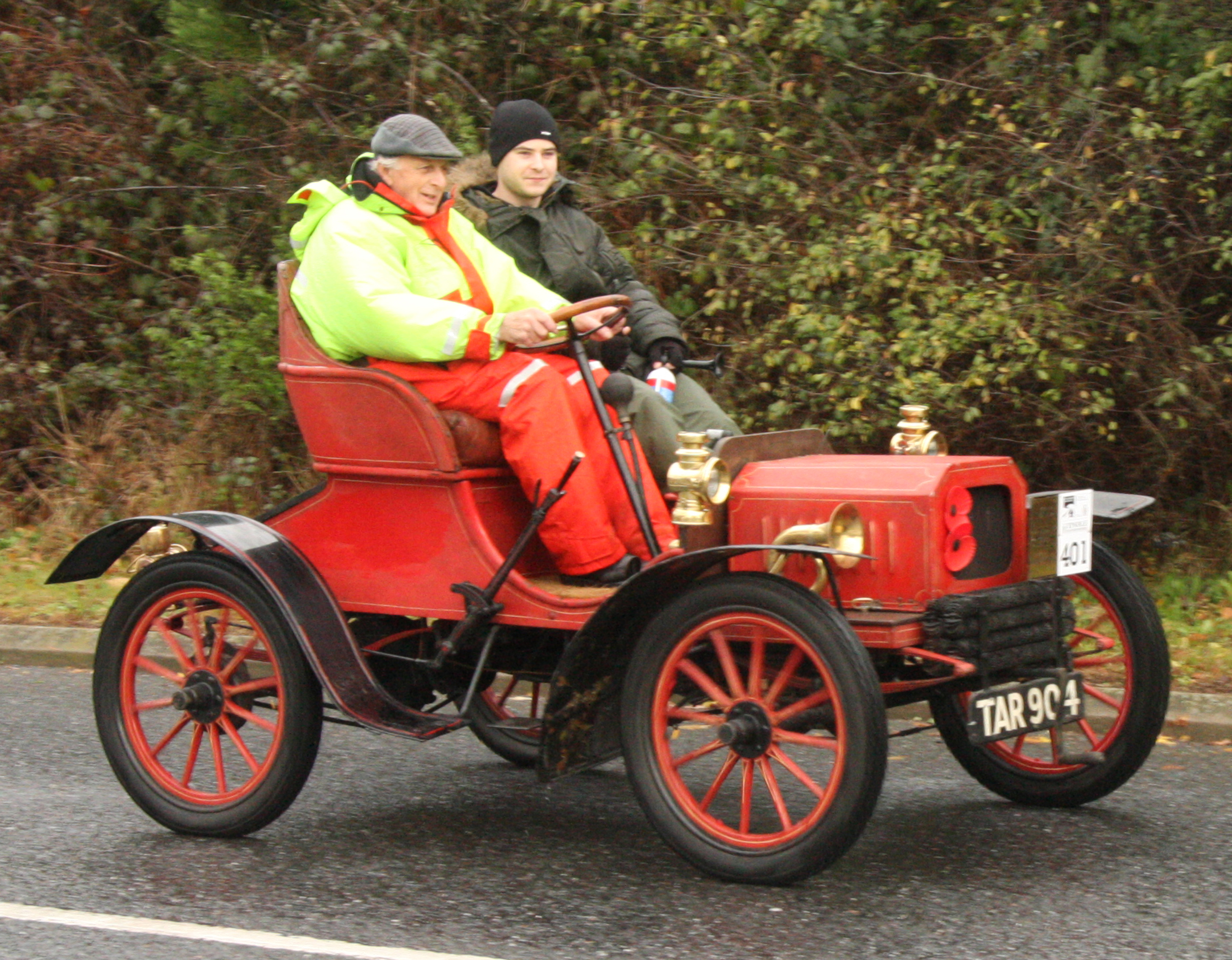
A 1904 Pope-Tribune taking part in the 2009 London Brighton veteran car run

The first Pope-Tribune, a single-cylinder runabout, was introduced in 1904. The engine displacement was 2128 cc with a bore of 133.35 mm and a stroke of 152.4 mm. The wheelbase was 1981 mm. It was to the design of Gilbert J. Loomis, who made the Loomis automobile of Westfield, Massachusetts. Model II also had a front-mounted, vertical, single-cylinder engine (with a 4.5in bore and a 4in stroke), wheel steering, sliding pinion gearbox, shaft drive and a bevel rear axle with a differential.

In 1905, the price of the car was reduced from $650 to $500, and a 12 hp two cylinder model was added. Production continued until 1908, but by then the cars had become larger and more expensive. The final models, with four-cylinder engines, were a 16/20 hp selling for $1,750 (equivalent to $60,469 in 2025, and a 30 hp for $2,750. The company closed in November 1908 and sold the Hagerstown factory.

The model that is on display in the National Motor Museum, Beaulieu, is an early model with a single cylinder and shaft drive.
