= List of motorcycles in the National Motor Museum, Beaulieu =

List of motorcycles in the National Motor Museum, Beaulieu in the U.K..

Make & Model	Displacement	Year	Country	Top Speed	Cylinders
ABC Skootamota	125 cc (7.6 cu in)	1920	United Kingdom	n/a	1
AJS 7R		1958			
Aprilia RS250		2001			
Ariel 4F		1931			
Ariel Chopper		1954			
Ariel Leader		1959			
Ariel Tricycle		1898			
Ascot-Pullin Utility De Luxe		1930			
BAT 5/6HP With Sidecar		1913			
Benelli 750 Sei		1978			
BMW R50 with Steib Sidecar		1957			
Brockhouse Corgi		1949			
Brough Superior 11.50 Special Combination		1936			
BSA B25 2HP		1925			
BSA Bantam D1		1949			
BSA Gold Star		1956			
BSA M21		1960			
BSA S28 OHV		1928			
Coventry-Eagle B33		1926			
Douglas Model R		1913			
Douglas Vespa 152/L2		1959			
Douglas with Dixon Banking Sidecar		1923			
Ducati 996		1995			
Ducati Hejira Formula 2 (Ducati 999RS)		1983			
Ducati Racer - Gregorio Lavilla		2006			
Ducati Racer - John Reynolds	996 cc (60.8 cu in)	2001			
Ducati Racer - Koji Haga		2004			
Ducati Racer - Michael Rutter		2002			
Ducati Racer - Neil Hodgson	996 cc (60.8 cu in)	2000			
Ducati Racer - Niall MacKenzie	996 cc (60.8 cu in)	2000			
Ducati Racer - Paul Marra Brown	996 cc (60.8 cu in)	2001			
Ducati Racer - Sean Emmett	996 cc (60.8 cu in)	2001			
Ducati Racer - Steve Hislop	996 cc (60.8 cu in)	2000			
Durkopp Diana		1957			
Elstar JAP Grasstrack		1948			
Greeves Hawkstone		1961			
Harley-Davidson 11HP	989 cc (60.4 cu in)	1915			
Harley-Davidson 42 WLC		1942			
Harris Honda CBR600 - Joey Dunlop		1997			
Honda CB750KO		1970	Japan		
Honda RC 162	249 cc (15.2 cu in)	1961	Japan		
Kawasaki Factory Racer		1975			
Kawasaki H2R Factory Randy Hall Special		1972			
Lambretta B		1948			
Lambretta 150 LD		1957			
Matchless 2½HP		1905			
Stafford Mobile Pup Auto Scooter	128 cc (7.8 cu in)	1919	United Kingdom		1
Motosacoche 2½HP	290 cc (18 cu in)	1913	Switzerland		
MV Agusta 750 Sport	743 cc (45.3 cu in)	1976	Italy		
Ner-A-Car	285 cc (17.4 cu in)	1921	United Kingdom		
Norton BS	490 cc (30 cu in)	1912	United Kingdom		
Norton 16H	490 cc (30 cu in)	1942	United Kingdom		
Norton 30M Manx		1960			
Norton 650SS		1962			
Norton Commando		1975			
Norton Prototype		1953			
Norton-Watsonian		1949			
NSU 3HP		1906			
Perks and Birch Autowheel		1899			
Peters 2¾HP		1924			
Rotrax Jap Speedway		1950			
Royal Enfield 3HP		1914			
Royal Enfield Crusader		1959			
Royal Enfield Experimental		1919			
Royal Enfield Prototype Army Mod		1945			
Rudge-Whitworth		1928			
Sunbeam Standard Model 3		1924			
Triumph 2½HP		1903			
Triumph 3TW		1940			
Triumph 5T Speed Twin		1948			
Triumph 6T Thunderbird		1949			
BSA Rocket 3/Triumph Trident		1972			
Triumph Twenty One (3TA)		1962			
Velocette LE Mk.III		1969			
Velocette Venom Thruxton Veeline		1965			
Welbike		1942			
Wooler		1920			
Yamaha 195cc		1972			
Zenith 3½HP		1912			
