= Jim Adema =

American snowmobile racer

- Born: January 29, 1942; Grand Rapids, Michigan
- Died: December 14, 1975 (aged 33); Ironwood, Michigan
- Cause of death: Snowmobile accident
- Known for: Snowmobile racing

Jim Adema was a snowmobile racing star during the first half of the 1970s. He was inducted into the Snowmobile Hall of Fame in 1988. An independent oval race driver, Adema won a record setting number of races from 1970 to 1975, all while riding on one of his modified Sno-Jets, each of which were ThunderJet models.

Collaborating with Sno-Jet's Advanced Research Team in 1970, Adema tested and advised on how to improve the new ThunderJet racer which, at the time, was unstable and not competitive. His effort helped the design team develop the 1972 oval track racing sled, which was initially met with poor reception. Its flat silhouette was mockingly dubbed "roadkill" or "ThunderChicken". After winning several races in which he hung to the inside of the track while others were wasting in the banks, he started a trend later adopted by many competitors.

Adema won the Kawartha Cup in 1972. His company Belmont Engineering introduced many technological features to the sport, including lightweight alloys, tungsten studs and runners, tapered tunnel for snow clearance, extra low centre of gravity and offset engine placement, and ergonomic steering and several safety features like twin density foam seats that prevented high g-force impact on a racer's spine when a bump was hit at high speed.

Adema later switched to Yamaha, after Kawasaki Corporation purchased Sno Jet.

== Death ==
On December 14, 1975 at Ironwood, Michigan, during a race in wet snow late in the evening, Adema clipped the vehicle of fellow racer Dick Trickle and lost control, throwing him off an estimated 100 feet. Adema got back up but Yvon Duhamel, unable to avoid a collision, struck him at a speed of 70 mph. A second machine driven by Joe Wolfe also struck Adema. He was pronounced dead on arrival at Memorial Hospital in Ashland, Wisconsin, marking the first professional snowmobile racing fatality in the sport's history.
