= National Motor Museum Monorail =

British monorail service

Coordinates: 50.823°N 1.454°W

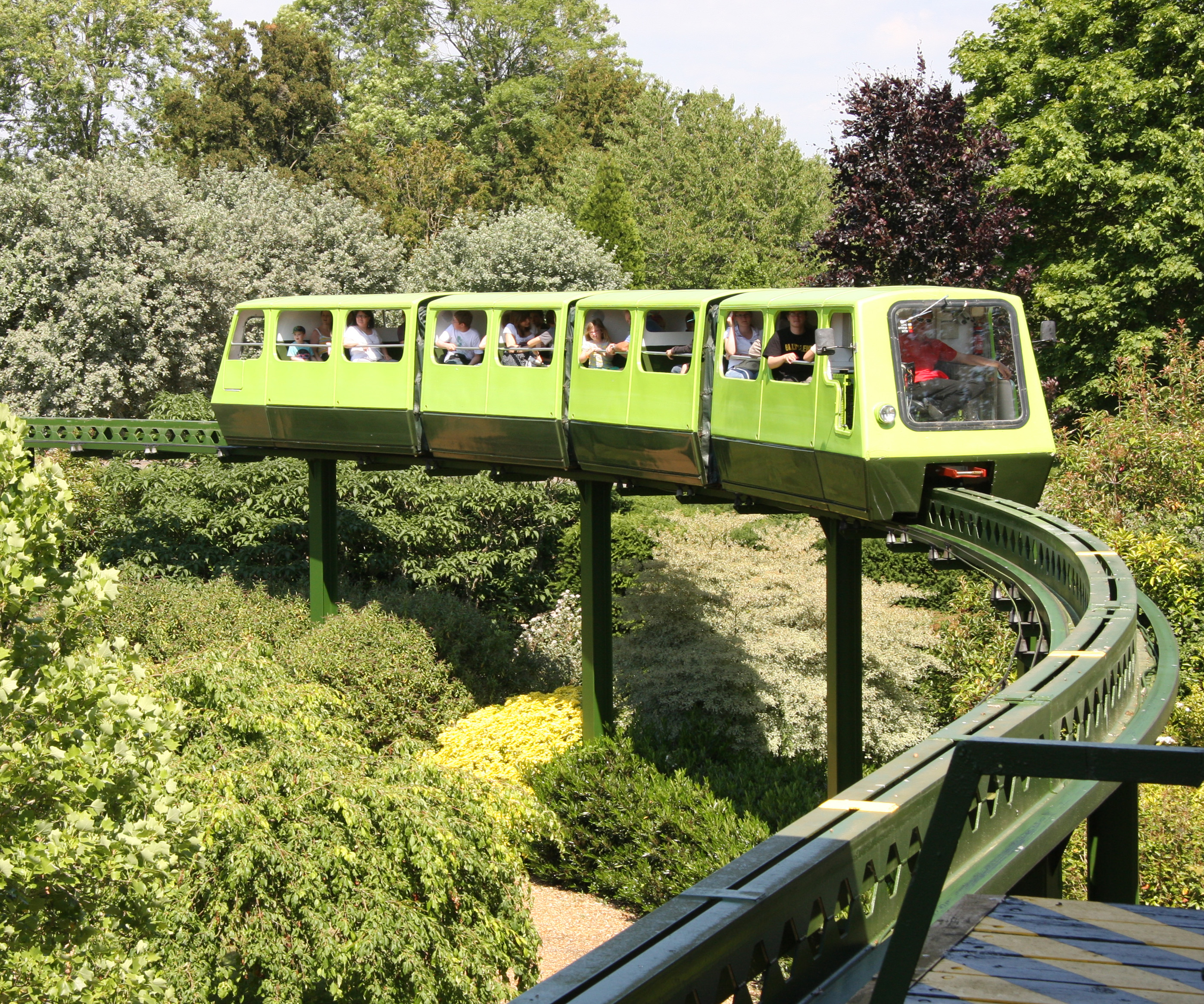

Overview
- Locale: Beaulieu, Hampshire
- Transit type: straddle-beam monorail
- Number of lines: 1
- Number of stations: 1 (formerly 2)

Operation
- Began operation: 1974
- Operator: Beaulieu Enterprises Ltd.
- Rolling stock: One four-car train

Technical
- System length: 1.6 km (1 mile)
- Electrification: 100 V DC fourth rail (current fed by 2 contact wires)

The Beaulieu Monorail is England's oldest operating monorail, linking the National Motor Museum to the Beaulieu Palace House. The monorail line passes through the main museum building, allowing passengers to see the automobile collection from above. The line was formally opened 29 July 1974.

In late 2023 the museum applied for planning permission to demolish the south station on the basis that most passengers ride the entire loop from the main station. The New Forest National Parks Authority granted permission at the end of December 2023.
