= Spirit 21 =

1970s American trailer sailer

Development
- Designer: Hank Hinckley
- Location: United States
- Year: 1977
- Builder: Glastron
- Role: Cruiser
- Name: Spirit 21

Boat
- Displacement: 2,100 lb (953 kg)
- Draft: 5.00 ft (1.52 m) with keel down

Hull
- Type: monohull
- Construction: fiberglass
- LOA: 21.25 ft (6.48 m)
- LWL: 18.75 ft (5.72 m)
- Beam: 7.83 ft (2.39 m)
- Engine: outboard motor

Hull appendages
- Keel: lifting keel
- Ballast: 550 lb (249 kg)
- Rudder: transom-mounted rudder

Rig
- Rig type: Bermuda rig
- I foretriangle height: 25.15 ft (7.67 m)
- J foretriangle base: 8.82 ft (2.69 m)
- P mainsail luff: 21.10 ft (6.43 m)
- E mainsail foot: 8.00 ft (2.44 m)

Sails
- Sailplan: masthead sloop
- Mainsail area: 84.40 sq ft (7.841 m^{2})
- Jib/genoa area: 110.91 sq ft (10.304 m^{2})
- Total sail area: 195.31 sq ft (18.145 m^{2})

Racing
- PHRF: 261

The Spirit 21, also called the Spirit 6.5 for its length overall in meters, is an American trailerable sailboat that was designed by Hank Hinckley as a cruiser and first built in 1977.

== Production ==
The design was built by Glastron in the United States, starting in 1977, but it is now out of production.

== Design ==
The Spirit 21 is a recreational keelboat, built predominantly of fiberglass, with wood trim. It has a masthead sloop rig, a raked stem, a plumb transom, a transom-hung rudder controlled by a tiller and a lifting keel. The cabin has a "pop-top" to increase headroom. The boat displaces 2,100 lb (953 kg) and carries 550 lb (249 kg) of ballast.

The boat has a draft of 5.00 ft (1.52 m) with the keel extended and 1.67 ft (0.51 m) with it retracted, allowing operation in shallow water or ground transportation on a trailer.

The boat is normally fitted with a small 3 to 6 hp (2 to 4 kW) outboard motor for docking and maneuvering.

The design has sleeping accommodation for four to five people, with a double "V"-berth in the bow cabin, two straight settee berths in the main cabin and an optional extra main cabin berth. The galley is located on the starboard side just aft of the companionway ladder. The head is located in the bow cabin under the "V"-berth. Cabin headroom is 52 in (132 cm) with the pop-top closed and 74 in (188 cm) with it open. A fresh water tank with a capacity of 5 U.S. gallons (19 L; 4.2 imp gal), was a factory option.

The design has a PHRF racing average handicap of 261 and a hull speed of 5.8 kn (10.7 km/h).

== Operational history ==
In a 2010 review Steve Henkel wrote, "generally speaking, Hank Hinckley, of the Southwest Harbor, Maine, Hinckleys of boatbuilding fame, did a good job designing the Spirit 6.5. The ads for her say that she has "probably the best designed, most spacious, most clearly thought-out interior on any sailboat her size." Indeed, her Space Index is higher than most of her comp[etitor]s by around 10%. But her headroom (poptop down) isn't as good as the Aquarius [21] (though it's 6' 2" with the poptop raised), and her draft is not as ramp-friendly as some of her comp[etitor]s (because her weighted swing keel is positioned lower in the hull to keep the cabin free of a trunk). Best features: For the same reason that her ramp draft is deeper than some of her comp[etitor]s, her cabin has more leg room, since there is no above-the-sole trunk housing the swing keel ... Worst features: The freeboard, which adds to her space below, is noticeably higher than her comps, giving her a boxy look,"

== See also ==
- List of sailing boat types
