= Bernard Codd =

British motorcycle racer

Bernard David Codd (1934 – 29 July 2013) was an English professional motorcycle road racer. He was a double winner at the 1956 Isle of Man TT motorcycle race.

Bernard was born in 1934 in Boston, Lincolnshire and he attended Boston Grammar School between 1945 and 1950.

In the Junior (350cc) race, Bernard led all the way for three laps of the Mountain Circuit at an average of over 82 mph. The same day, on a 500cc for the Senior race, he led the first lap closely followed by Ron Jerrard. His second lap edged him away, and he continued to pull away to win after the third lap, averaging over 86 mph overall. His two race times were 1h 22m 40.4s & 1h 18m 40.6s.

In 1957 following the TT, another rider at Crystal Palace hit him from behind. Injuries to his right leg put an end to his career.

Bernard died on 29 July 2013, aged 79.

Recently published is "Bernard Codd - His Racing" Story by Paul Skinner, available on Amazon

https://imuseum.im/search/collections/events/mnh-event-467.html

== Sources ==
- The History of the Clubman's TT Races 1947–1956. Pidcock & Snelling
