= National Motor Museum, Beaulieu =

National Motor Museum
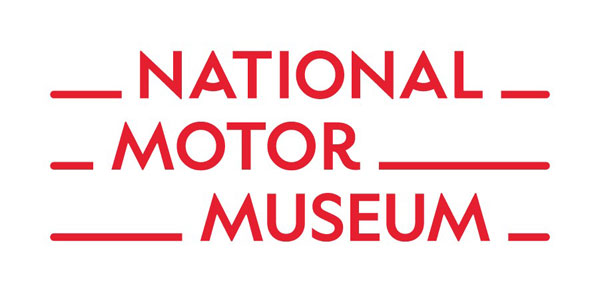

- Location within Hampshire
- Established: 1952; 74 years ago
- Location: Beaulieu, Hampshire, England
- Coordinates: 50°49′23″N 1°27′13″W
- Type: Automobile museum
- Website: www.nationalmotormuseum.org.uk www.beaulieu.co.uk

The National Motor Museum (originally the Montagu Motor Museum) is a museum in the village of Beaulieu, set in the heart of the New Forest, in the English county of Hampshire.

== History ==
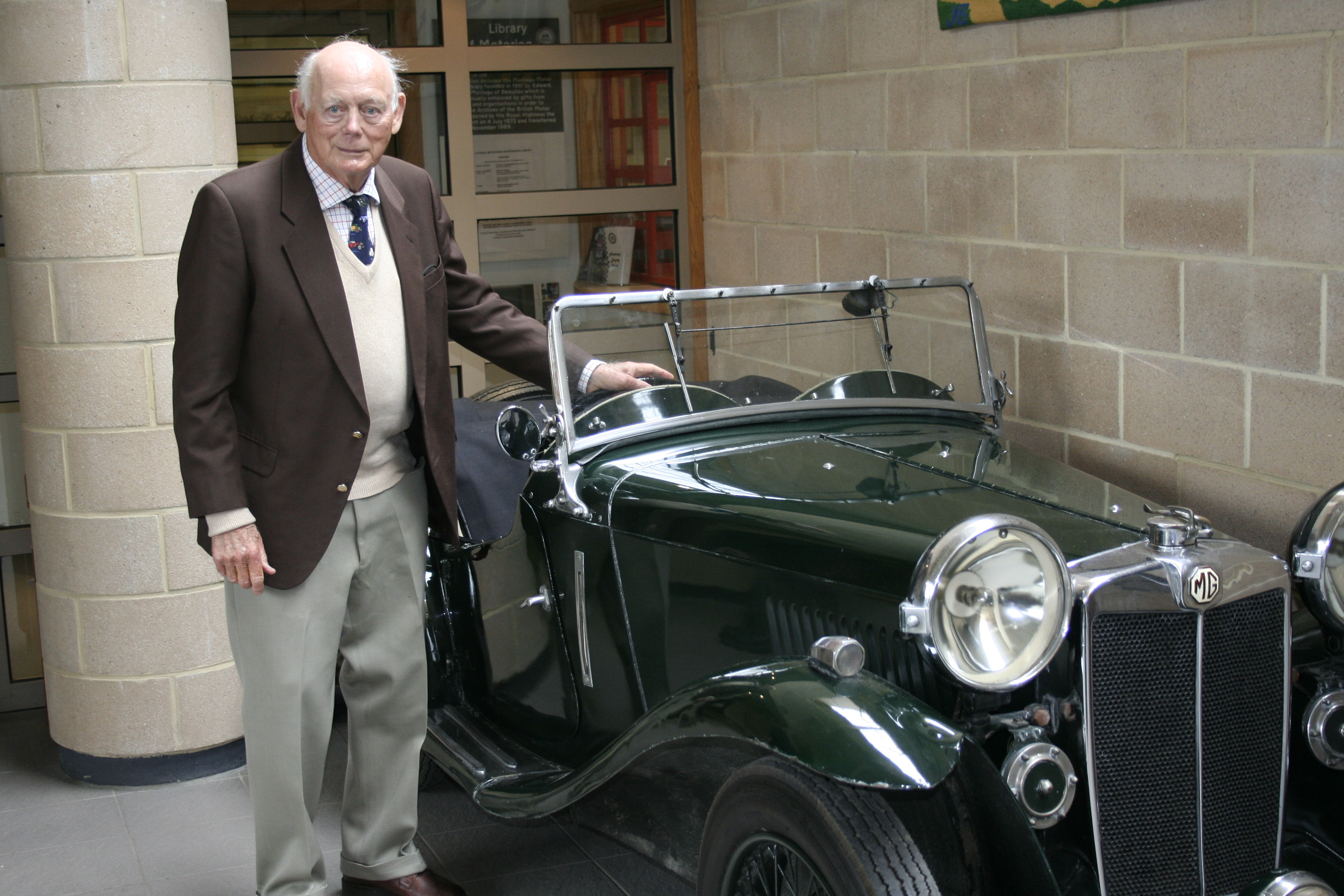
Lord Montagu of Beaulieu with one of his classic MGs in March 2007

The museum was founded in 1952 by the 3rd Baron Montagu of Beaulieu as a tribute to his father, John, 2nd Baron Montagu of Beaulieu, who was one of the pioneers of motoring in the United Kingdom, being the first person to drive a motor car into the yard of the Houses of Parliament, and having introduced King Edward VII (then the Prince of Wales) to motoring during the 1890s.

At first, the museum consisted of just five cars and a small collection of automobilia displayed in the front hall of Lord Montagu of Beaulieu's ancestral home, Palace House; but such was the popularity of this small display that the collection soon outgrew its home, and was transferred to wooden sheds in the grounds of the house. The reputation and popularity of the Beaulieu collection continued to grow: during 1959, the museum's "attendance figures" reached 296,909.

By 1964, annual attendance exceeded the half a million mark and a decision was taken to create a purpose-built museum building in the grounds of the Beaulieu Estate. A design committee chaired by the architect Sir Hugh Casson was created to drive the project, and the architect Leonard Manasseh was given the contract for the design of the building which was primarily the work of his partner Ian Baker.

By 1972, the collection exceeded 300 exhibits. In a ceremony performed by the Duke of Kent, the new purpose-built museum building in the parkland surrounding Palace House was opened on 4 July 1972: the name was changed to the "National Motor Museum", reflecting a change of status from a private collection to a charitable trust and highlighting Lord Montagu of Beaulieu's stated aim to provide Britain with a National Motor Museum "worthy of the great achievements of its motor industry". The opening of the museum coincided with the UK launch of the Jaguar XJ12, which made it an appropriate week for celebrating the UK motor industry. The museum is now run by the National Motor Museum Trust Ltd, a registered charity.

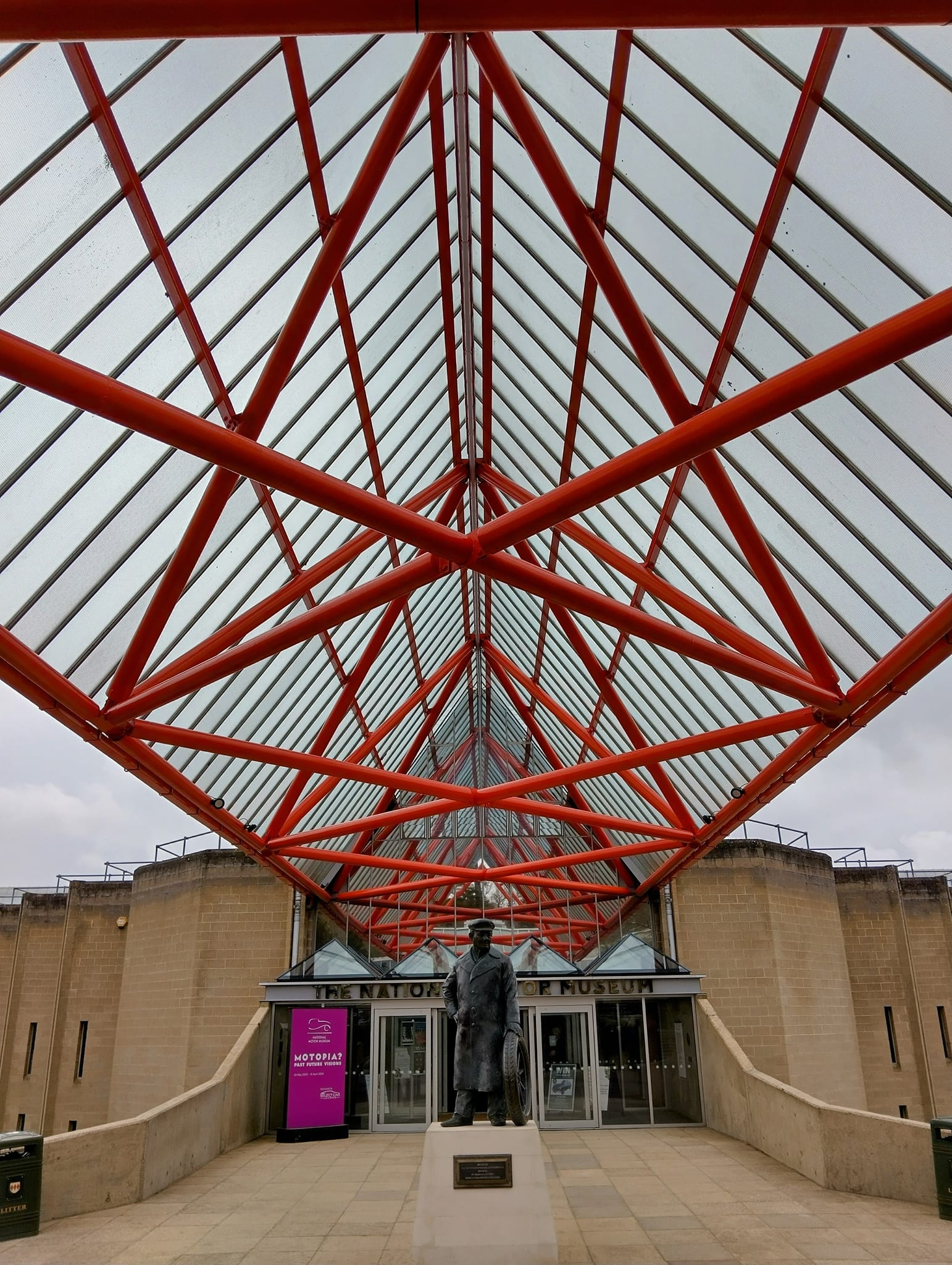
The entrance of the National Motor Museum

An unusual feature of the new museum building in 1972 is the National Motor Museum Monorail passing through its interior. This was inspired by the light railway running through the US Pavilion at the Montreal World's Fair, Expo 67.

== The museum today ==
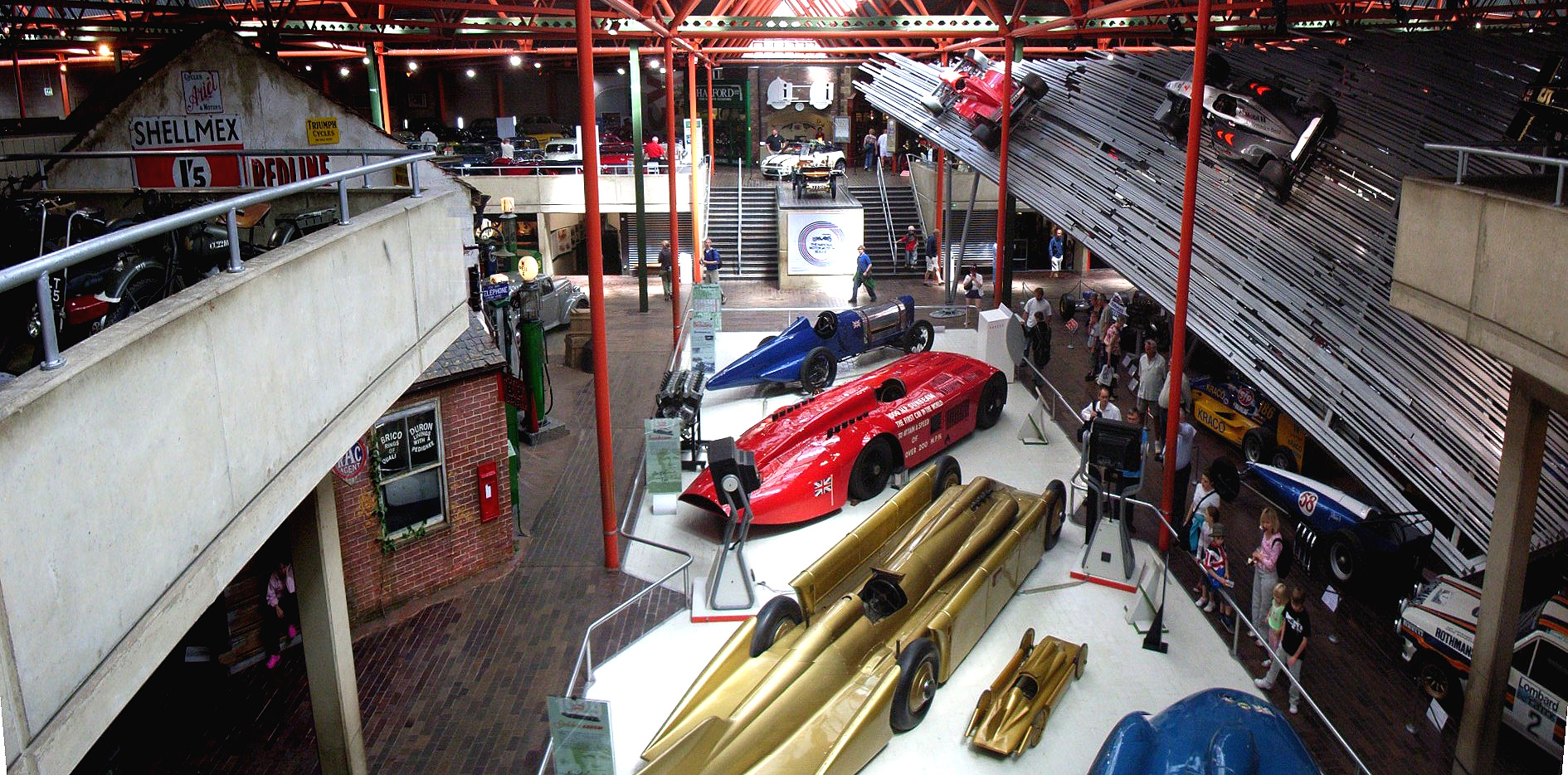
National Motor Museum, Beaulieu, main hall in the 1990s.

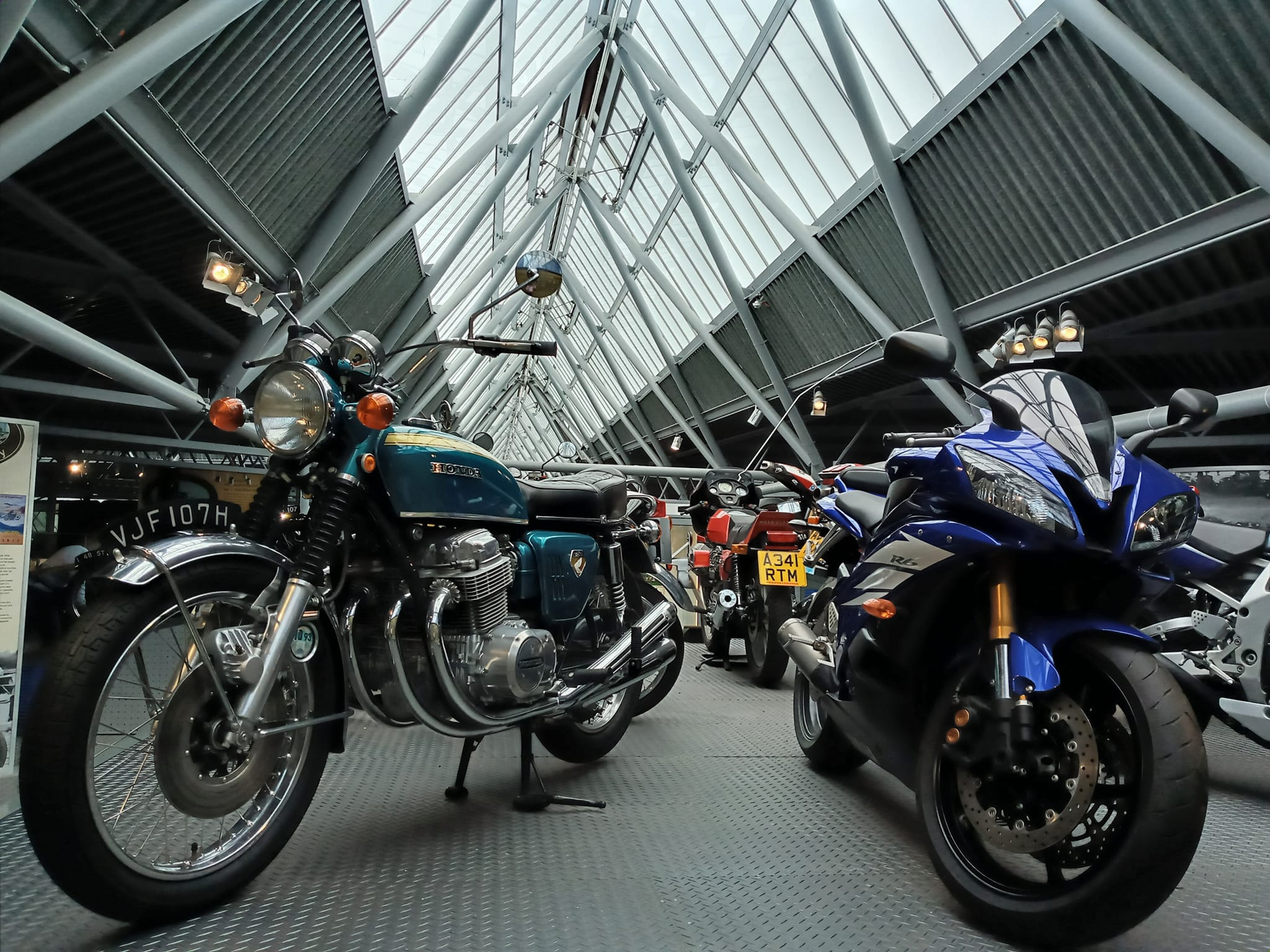
Motorcycle gallery in the National Motor Museum at Beaulieu

See List of vehicles at the National Motor Museum, Beaulieu

Today, in addition to around 300 vehicles manufactured since the late-19th century, the museum has a collection of motoring books, journals, photographs, films, and automobilia of the world and is affiliated to the British Motorcycle Charitable Trust. The National Motor Museum is an Accredited Museum, with all its collections designated by Arts Council England as being of national and international importance. Its collection of more than 1.9 million items is cared for by the National Motor Museum Trust and includes historically significant motoring artefacts, film footage, images, documents and books. The nearby Collections Centre houses and cares for a vast array of motoring artefacts, photographic images, a specialist reference library, and a film and video library. There are approximately 185 cars and commercial vehicles in the Museum, 51% are owned by the National Motor Museum Trust, 26% are owned by Beaulieu Enterprises Ltd and on long-term loan to the National Motor Museum Trust, and 23% are on loan to the Trust from other organisations and private individuals. There are approximately 114 motorcycles. 48% owned by the National Motor Museum Trust, 20% owned by Beaulieu Enterprises Ltd and on long-term loan to the National Motor Museum Trust, and 32% on loan from other organisations and private individuals.

Vehicles in the museum collection range from the earliest motor carriages to classic family saloons, motorsport cars, motorcycles, and World Land Speed record breakers. A 'Streets Ahead' gallery displays cars, motorcycles and shop fronts from the 1950s to the 1970s. The museum's In Focus gallery houses temporary exhibitions, some containing artefacts and media from the museum's Collections Centre. Grand Prix Greats celebrates the history of Formula 1, whilst Road, Race & Rally focuses on sports cars from rallying and hill-climbing. A recreation of a rustic 1930s garage contains artefacts, fixtures, fittings, tools and ephemera from the era. A multi-media display tells the story of British Land Speed record attempts and contains iconic vehicles such as the Bluebird CN7, Golden Arrow, Sunbeam 350 hp, and the Sunbeam 1000 hp.

The "On Screen Cars" exhibit has a display of TV and film cars including Del Boy's Reliant Regal as featured in the BBC sitcom Only Fools and Horses, Mr. Bean's lime green Mini and Doctor Who's Bessie.

Some of the cars used in various James Bond films were displayed in the Bond in Motion – No Time To Die exhibition in 2022. A Jaguar XKR Convertible used in the Bond film Die Another Day is part of the museum's permanent collection.

The exhibit "World of Top Gear" showcased cars created and used by Top Gear presenters Jeremy Clarkson, Richard Hammond, James May, Matt LeBlanc, Rory Reid, Chris Harris, Paddy McGuinness and Freddie Flintoff from June 2009 until November 2024. The exhibit welcomed over five million visitors, showcasing both vehicles and props from the BBC series. It closed on 3 November 2024, replaced by a modern classic car display entitled 'We had one of those.' .

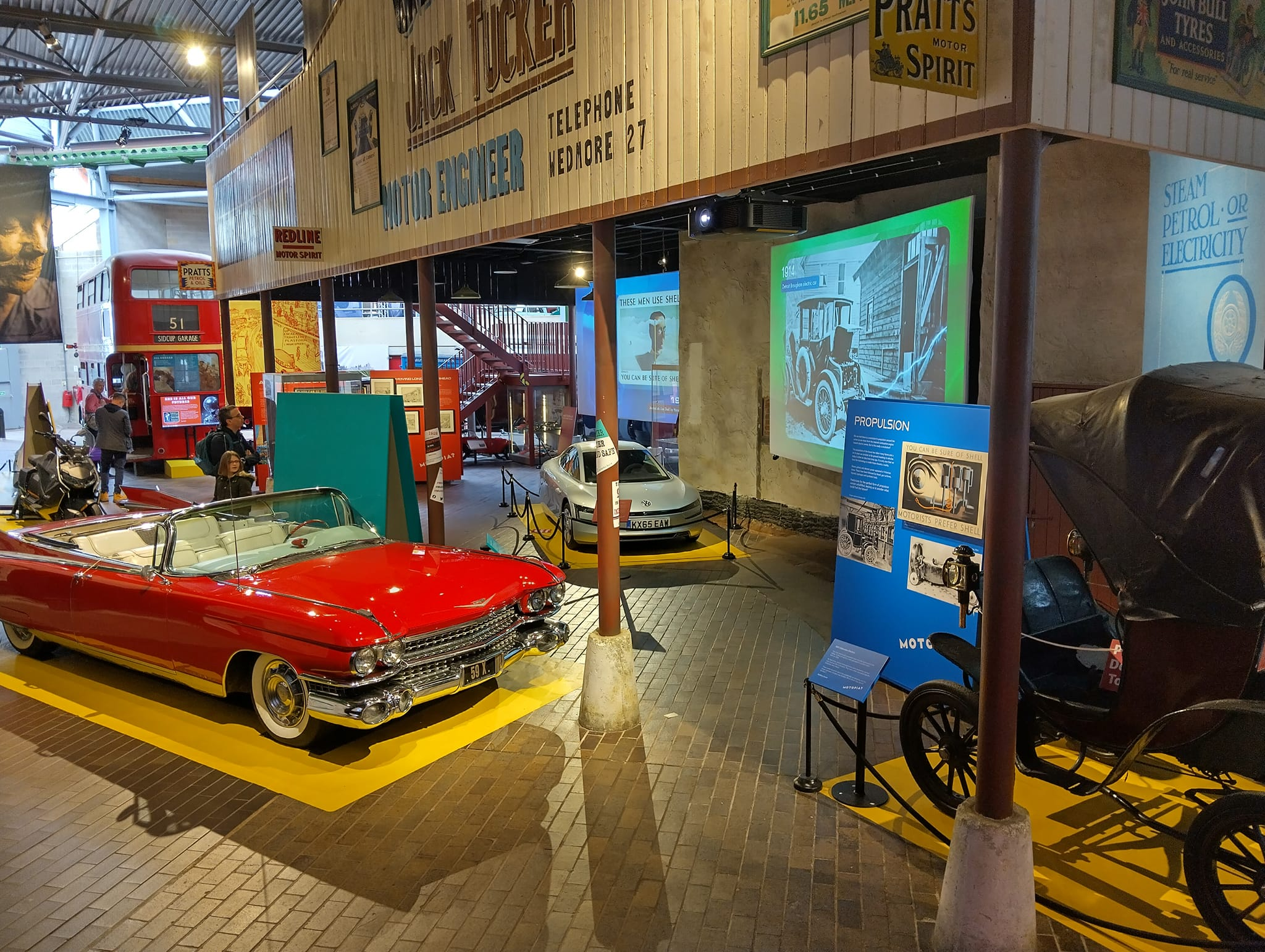
Motopia? Past Future Visions exhibition at the National Motor Museum

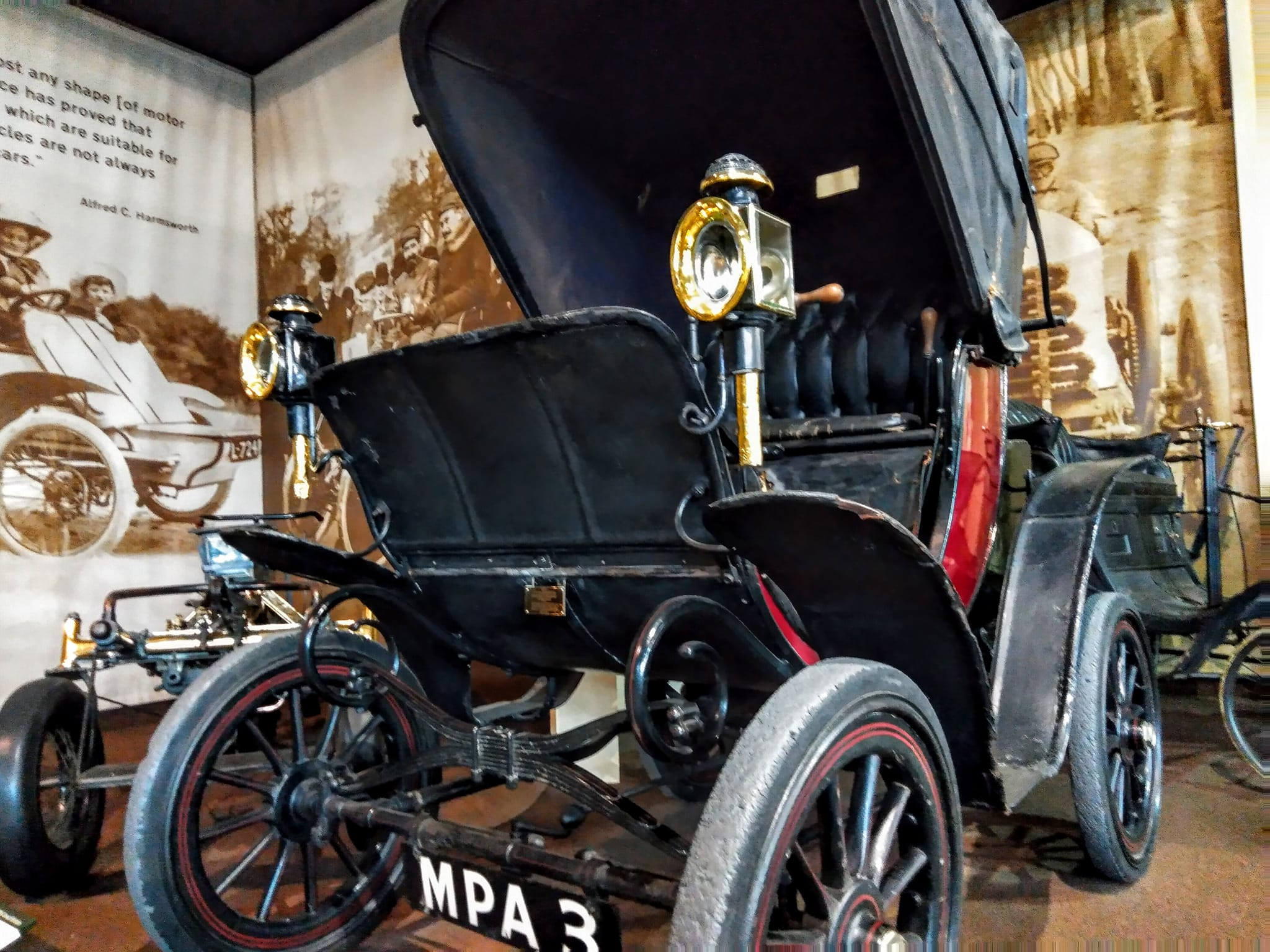
Columbia Electric (1901), one of the first electric vehicles in the National Motor Museum

The museum also hosts a collection of the well-known Rolls-Royce radiator mascots – the Spirit of Ecstasy – also known as the Flying Lady. The collection includes a figurine commissioned by John Walter Edward Douglas-Scott-Montagu, the 2nd Baron to his friend Charles Robinson Sykes who sculpted a personal mascot for the bonnet of his Rolls-Royce Silver Ghost. Sykes originally crafted a figurine of a female model, Eleanor Thornton, in fluttering robes, pressing a finger against her lips – to symbolise the secret of the love between John and Eleanor, his secretary. The figurine was consequently named The Whisper.

Additional attractions include the National Motor Museum Monorail, veteran bus ride, playground, restaurant and a substantial part of the Palace House and grounds, including the partially ruined Beaulieu Abbey. Among the monastery buildings to have been preserved are the domus (now used for functions and exhibitions), and the refectory, which is now the parish church.

The museum opened a new gallery in the Spring of 2026; "Driven: Britain's Motoring Story." Part funded by the National Lottery Heritage Fund the £700,000 project gave the museum at Beaulieu a new look to its entrance hall and upper-gallery and re-introduced visitors to the story of motoring in Britain.

== Beaulieu attractions ==
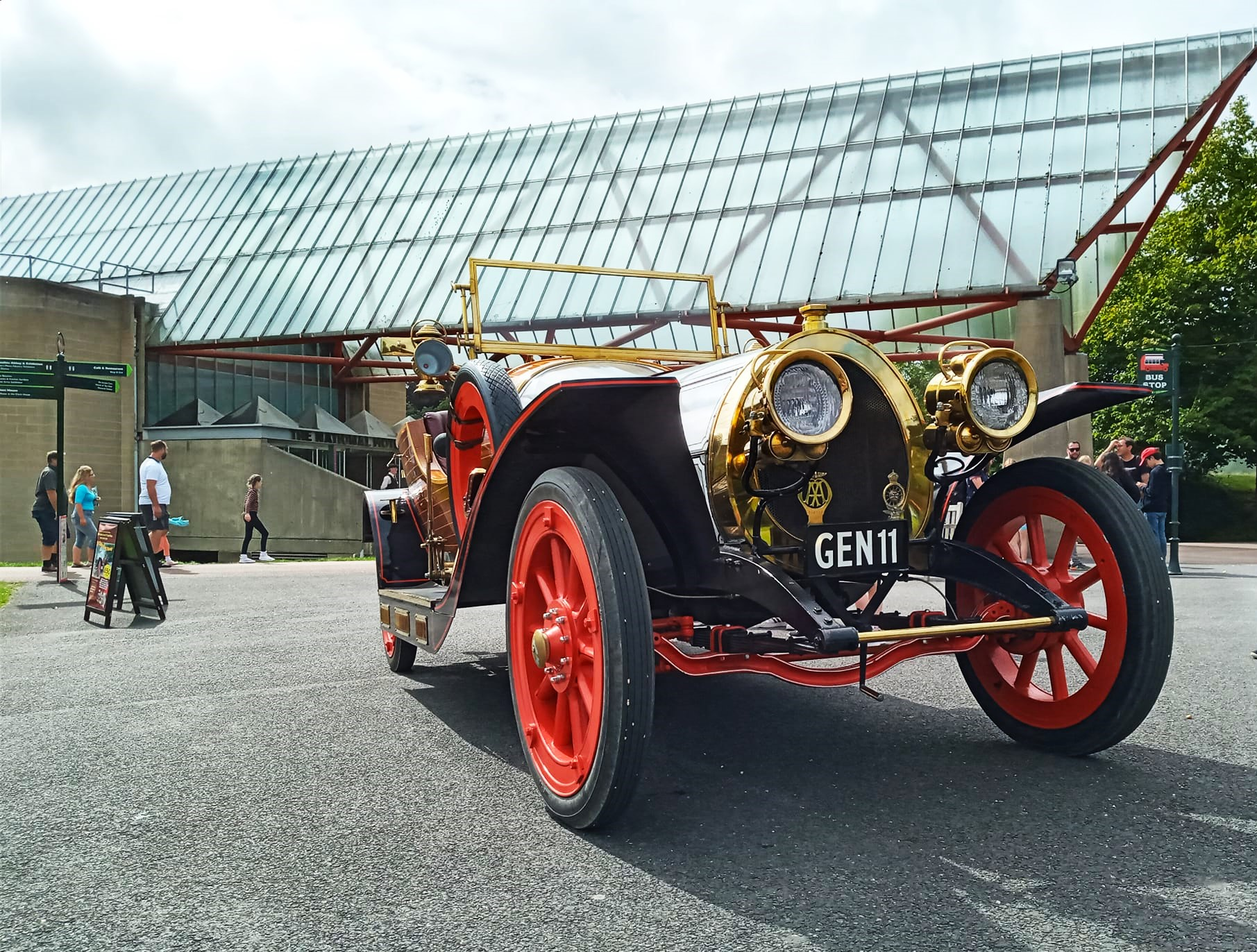
Chitty Chitty Bang Bang outside the National Motor Museum

The National Motor Museum is one of several attractions on Lord Montagu's Beaulieu estate which are marketed jointly as "Beaulieu". The attraction is owned and managed by Beaulieu Enterprises Ltd, which leases the National Motor Museum and the museum's Collections Centre to the National Motor Museum Trust, and provides a share of the visitor income to the Trust. A range of business services are provided to the Trust by Beaulieu Enterprises.

One admission ticket includes the following attractions:

- National Motor Museum
- Beaulieu Abbey
- Beaulieu Palace House
- Secret Army Exhibition – an exhibit about the Special Operations Executive (SOE) training at Beaulieu during World War II
- Gardens
- 'We Had One of Those' interactive display focused on modern classic cars
- National Motor Museum Monorail

== Relocation ==
In August 2026 the National Motor Museum Trust announced that it had begun "the process of identifying a transformational new home for the National Motor Museum as its current lease at Beaulieu approaches the end of its 60-year term." After negotiations, Beaulieu Enterprises, the Beaulieu Estate and the Montagu family took the decision not to grant a new longer lease, as they are not able "to deliver what the National Motor Museum Trust felt it needed from a future arrangement, without risking the financial sustainability of Beaulieu." The decision made by the Montagu family means that Trust has had no option other than to search for a new home, "in all likelihood collaborating with other museums with suitable facilities for displaying automobile collections."

== See also ==
- List of motorcycles in the National Motor Museum, Beaulieu
- List of vehicles at the National Motor Museum, Beaulieu
