= Glastron =

American manufacturer of watercraft

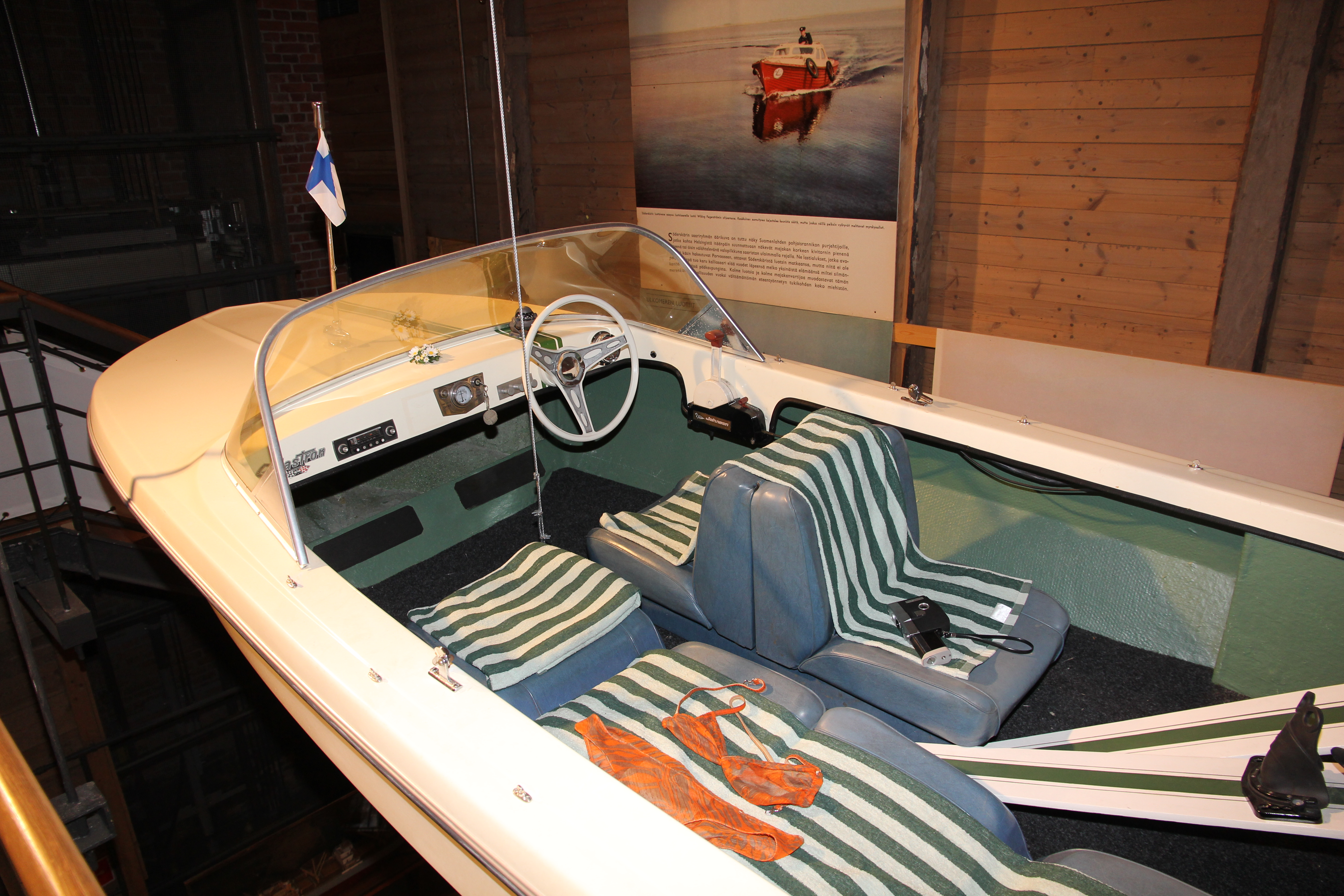
Glastron V-142 Skilifte motor boat in Forum Marinum maritime museum

Glastron is a boat manufacturing company and was one of the first manufacturers of fiberglass boats. Glastron is owned by Rec Boat Holdings, a subsidiary of Groupe Beneteau.

Bob Hammond, Bill Gaston, Bob Shoop, and Guy Woodard founded the company on October 14, 1956, in Austin, Texas. It was sold to Genmar Holdings in the 1990s and manufacturing was moved to Minnesota. Glastron is known for its boat hull design innovations, including the Aqualift and "SSV" hull designs, the latter of which is still in use today.

Glastron's "Glastonbury" boats were featured in the James Bond films Live and Let Die and Moonraker. For Live and Let Die, a boat chase was filmed in Louisiana around the Irish Bayou area. Twenty-six boats were built by Glastron for the film, of which seventeen were destroyed during rehearsals. The speedboat jump scene over the bayou, filmed with the assistance of a specially-constructed ramp, unintentionally set a Guinness World Record at the time with 110 feet (34 m) cleared. The waves created by the impact caused the following boat to flip over. Jaws 3 also features several boats with the brand name on the sides.

== Boats ==
- Spirit 21 - sailboat
