= BSA M21 =

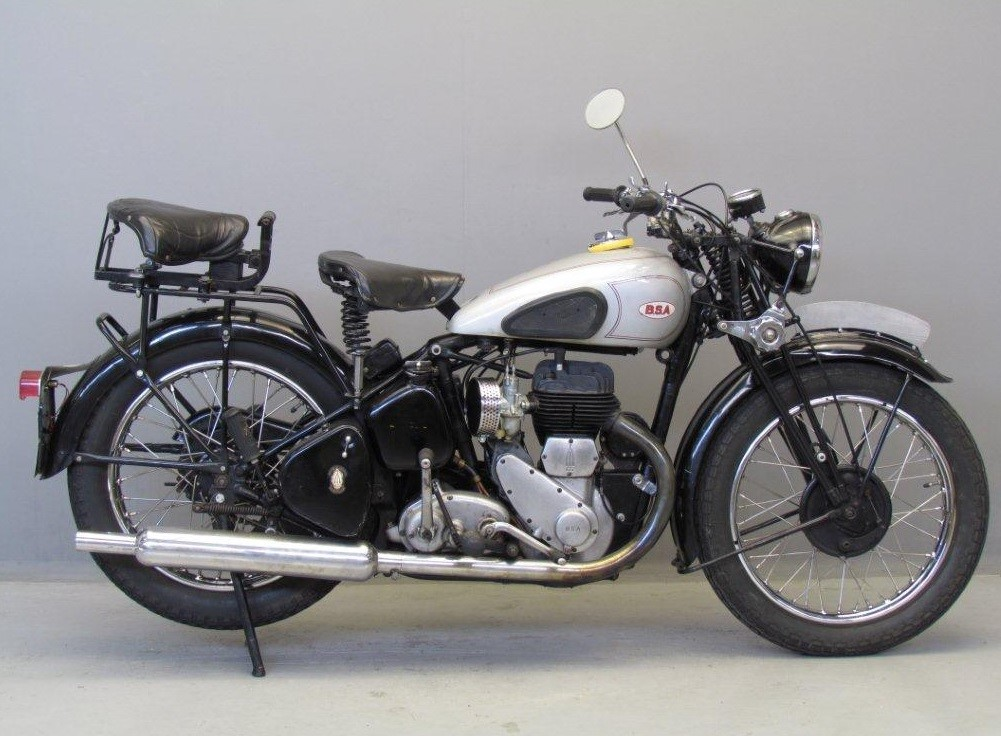
- 1939 BSA M21
- Manufacturer: BSA
- Production: 1939-1963
- Assembly: Small Heath, Birmingham
- Engine: 591 cc (36.1 cu in) single cylinder side-valve
- Bore / stroke: 82 mm × 112 mm (3.2 in × 4.4 in)
- Power: 15 bhp (11 kW)

The BSA M21 is a 600 cc (37 cu in) single cylinder side-valve motorcycle manufactured by the BSA in Small Heath, Birmingham. The motorcycle was frequently fitted with a sidecar. It was used by the Royal Dutch Touring Club (ANWB) and British AA for roadside assistance.

== History ==
In 1936 BSA decided their motorcycle range needed a revamp to maximise sales in the improving world economic situation. Val Page was hired to update the motorcycle range. Page scrapped the whole range except the v-twins and designed a totally new range of single cylinder motorcycles. Engines now used dry sumps and the magdyno was placed behind the cylinder. New frames were designed using all tubes rather the cast backbone previously used. The new models were given a B prefix for the lightweights and M for the heavyweights.

The M21 was introduced as a 600cc side-valve tourer in 1937. It had a bore and stroke of 85mm x 105mm. In 1938 the bore was reduced to 82mm, the same as the M20, and stroke increased to 112mm. Initially it was fitted with a hand gear change but this changed to foot-change in 1939. After the outbreak of WW2, the War Department took every machine BSA could produce including the M21. In 1940 BSA concentrated on production of the M20 for military uses and production of other models was suspended. Production of the M21 resumed in 1946. In 1948 telescopic forks were fitted. The new forks had a longer travel which required modification of the frame down tube to prevent the mudguard hitting the frame. The following year a revised gearbox was fitted.

Side-valve engines tend to run hot and in 1951 an alloy head was fitted to try and keep temperatures down. A frame with plunger rear suspension was offered as an option in the same year. An Amal Monobloc carburettor was fitted in 1955 and the following year a larger 8" front brake introduced.

In 1958 the model was dropped from the BSA catalogue but was still available for special order until 1963.

== Roadside assistance ==
AA roadside assistance M21 combination

The bikes were often used with a sidecar. The Royal Dutch Touring Club (ANWB) used a fleet fitted with sidecars containing spares and tools for roadside assistance and breakdowns. The British AA also used a fleet of M21s with sidecars in the 1950s and 1960s. AA models were fitted with a crankshaft driven alternator in addition to the dynamo from 1961. The AA M21 combinations were replaced with vans in 1968.
