= List of motorcycles of the 1930s =

This a listing of motorcycles of the 1930s, including those on sale, introduced, or otherwise relevant in this period.

== Motorcycle ==
- Abendsonne
- Acme motorcycle (1939–1949)
- AJS Model E (1925–1939)
- AJS S3 V-twin
- AJS Silver Streak
- AJS V4
- Ariel Red Hunter
- Ariel Square Four
- BMW R12
- BMW R2
- BMW WR 750 (Introduced 1929 on sale in 1930s)
- BMW Type 255 (produced 1935–1939)
- Brough Superior Austin Four
- Brough Superior Golden Dream
- BSA B21
- BSA Blue Star
- BSA C11
- BSA Empire Star
- BSA Gold Star
- BSA M20
- BSA M33-10
- BSA W33-7
- DKW RT 125
- DKW SS 350
- Excelsior Manxman
- Harley-Davidson RL 45
- Husqvarna Model 200
- Matchless G3/L
- Matchless Silver Hawk
- New Imperial Model 76
- Norton 16H
- OEC
- PMZ-A-750
- Royal Enfield Bullet
- Royal Enfield WD/RE
- Scott Model 3S
- Scott Flying Squirrel (1926–1939)
- Sokół 1000
- Triumph 6/1 (1933–1935)
- Type 97 motorcycle
- Vincent Comet
- Vincent Rapide
- Vincent Meteor
- Wolf Cub
- Wolf Minor
- Wolf Utility
- Wolf Vixen
- Wolf Supersports
- Wolf Unit

== Tricycle ==
- Harley-Davidson Servi-Car
- Indian Dispatch-Tow

== Gallery ==
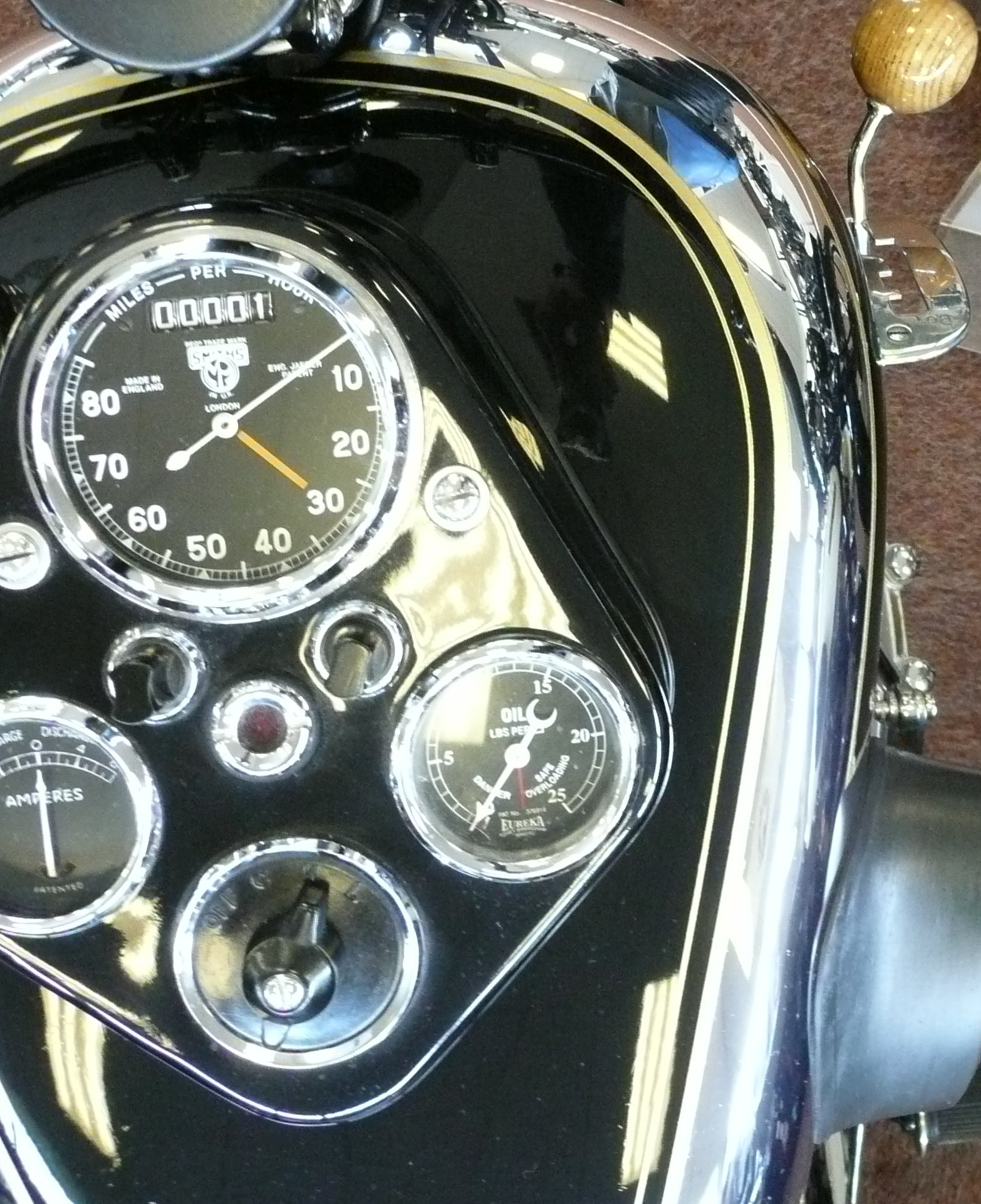
Rider's view of the AJS S3 V-twin instruments.

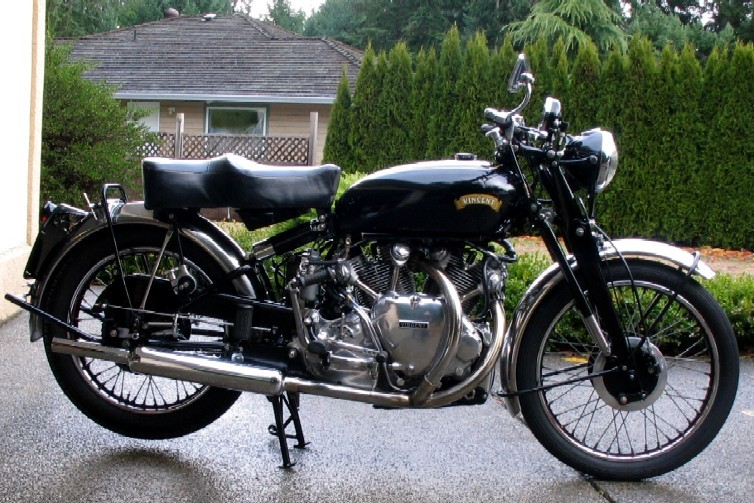
Vincent Rapide

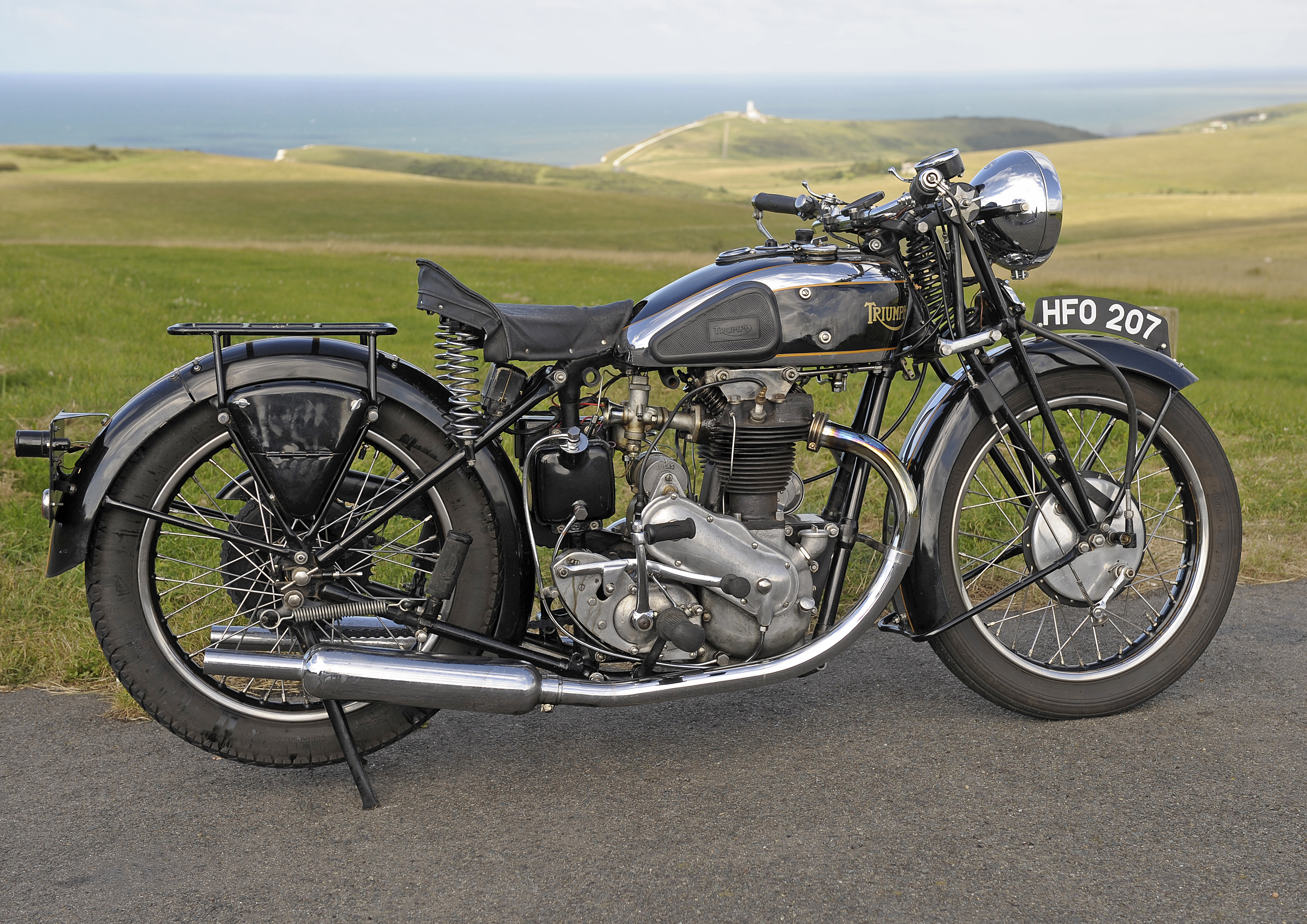
Triumph 6/1

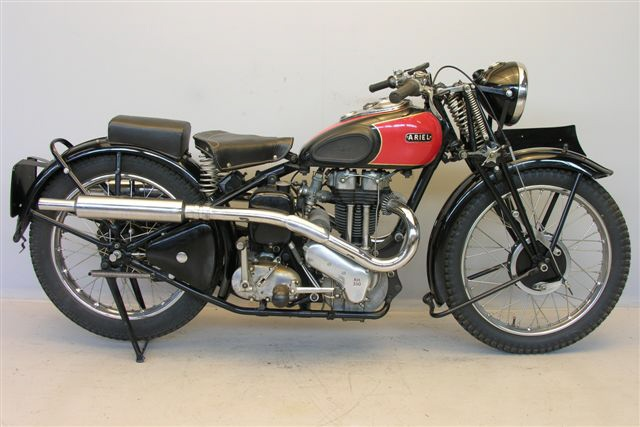
Ariel Red Hunter

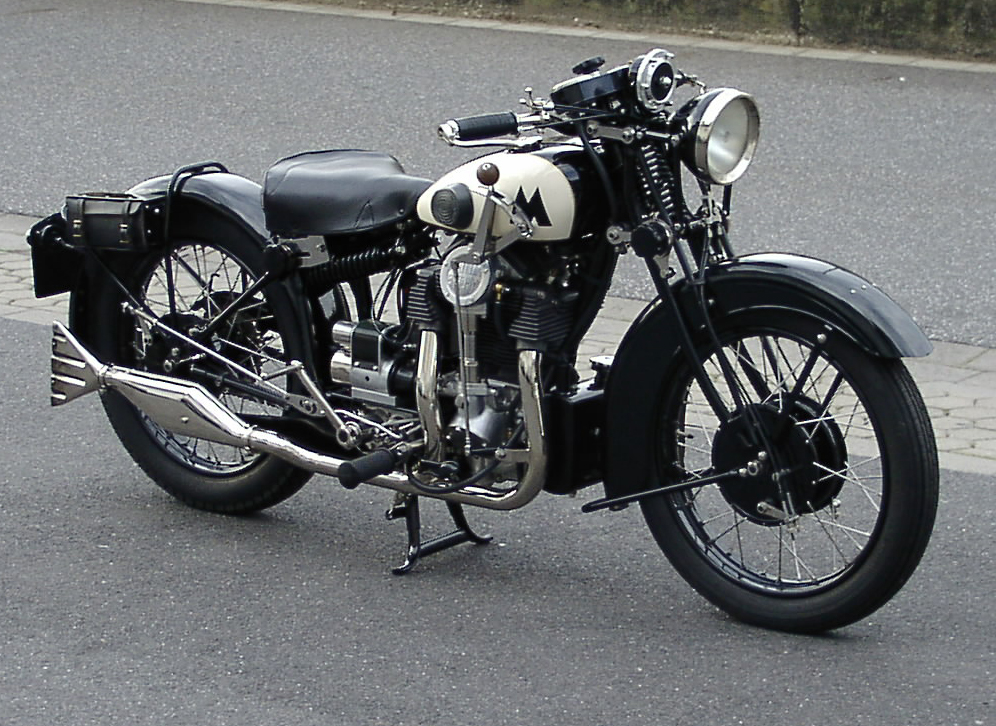
Matchless Silver Hawk

== See also ==
- Cyclecars
- Ford Model T
- List of motorcycles by type of engine
- List of motorcycles of the 1890s
- List of motorcycles of 1900 to 1909
- List of motorcycles of the 1910s
- List of motorcycles of the 1920s
- List of motorcycles of the 1940s
- List of motorcycles of the 1950s
- List of motorcycle manufacturers
- List of motorized trikes
- Safety bicycle
