= BSA M series =

The BSA M series are a series of pre-unit single-cylinder side-valve and OHV four-stroke motorcycles that was made by Birmingham Small Arms Company (BSA) at its factory in Armoury Road, Small Heath, Birmingham from the 1930s to the 1960s. They were mostly designed by Val Page in 1936 for the 1937 model year.

== Background ==
In 1936 BSA decided their motorcycle range needed a revamp to maximise sales in the improving world economic situation. Val Page was hired to update the motorcycle range. Page scrapped the whole range except the v-twins and designed a totally new range of single cylinder motorcycles. Engines now used dry sumps and the magdyno was placed behind the cylinder. New frames were designed using all tubes rather the cast backbone previously used.

The new models were given a B prefix for the lightweights and M for the heavyweights.

== Models ==
=== M10 ===
Produced in 1936 only, the M10 was a 5.95 hp (Note: From 1910 to 1947 quoted horsepower was 'taxation horsepower'. This used the RAC horsepower formula to determine horsepower and was based on the cylinder diameter but the stroke was not taken into account. Prior to 1937, BSA referred to their models by horsepower rather than engine size.) 595cc side-valve engine fitted in Y13 cycle parts. (Note: The Y13 was a 7.48hp 750cc O.H.V. vee-twin.) The engine produced 15 bhp (11 kW). It was replaced by the Page designed M21 in 1937.

=== M19 ===
The M19, produced in 1937 and 1938 only, was 350cc OHV machine that was catalogued as a 'de-luxe tourer'. It shared the same 94mm stroke as the 500cc models and had a bore of 68.8mm. Less than 200 M19s were manufactured.

=== M20 ===
The M20 was introduced in 1937 as a 500cc side-valve tourer. Initially it was fitted with a hand gear change but this changed to foot-change in 1938. A De luxe version was offered in 1939. A military version, the WM20, was introduced and over 125,000 were produced during WW2. Post-War, production continued to 1955.

=== M21 ===
The M21 was introduced as a 600cc side-valve tourer in 1937. After the outbreak of WW2, the War Department took every machine BSA could produce including the M21. In 1940 BSA concentrated on production of the M20 for military uses and production of other models was suspended. Production of the M21 resumed in 1946. In 1948 telescopic forks were fitted. The following year a revised gearbox was fitted. Side-valve engines tend to run hot and in 1951 an alloy head was fitted to try and keep temperatures down. A frame with plunger rear suspension was offered as an option in the same year. An Amal Monobloc carburettor was fitted in 1955 and the following year a larger 8" front brake introduced. In 1958 the model was dropped from the BSA catalogue but was still available for special order until 1963.

The bikes were often used with a sidecar. The Royal Dutch Touring Club (ANWB) and the British AA used fleets fitted with sidecars containing spares and tools for roadside assistance and breakdowns.

=== M22 ===
The 496cc OHV M22 Sports was introduced in 1937. It shared the same bore and stroke dimensions of 82 x 94mm as the M20 and M23. A twin port head was available as an option. The twin port versions were fitted with high level exhausts, around 300 twin-port models were made. Production stopped in 1939.

=== M23 Empire Star/Silver Star ===
The 496cc OHV Empire Star was the top of the range BSA single. First introduced in 1935 as the Q8 model, the model was completely redesigned by Page as the M23 for 1937. A twin-port version with high level exhausts was available as an option.

In 1937 at Brooklands race track, Isle of Man TT winner Wal Handley won a race with a fastest lap at 107.57 mph (173.12 km/h) on a specially modified M23 Empire Star. The motorcycle used by Handley had a special racing carburettor, a new design of magneto and close ratio gearing. Handley had been persuaded out of 'retirement' especially for the three-lap race, which meant 8 mi (13 km) at top speed on the uneven and deteriorating banked oval track. Handley was awarded one of the traditional Gold Star badges for an average speed for the race exceeding 100 mph (160 km/h).

The model was renamed to Silver Star in 1939.

=== M24 Gold Star ===
Introduced in 1938, the 496cc OHV Gold Star is an all-alloy derivative of the M23. It is regarded as Page's best design during his time at BSA. The model had a frame constructed from Reynalds 531 tubing and a gearbox casing made from elektron. The engines were individually bench-tested and guaranteed to produce 28 bhp (21 kW) running on petrol or 33 bhp (25 kW) running on alcohol. In the second year of production, a reprofiled cam was fitted and the gearbox casing made of alloy. Less than 500 examples were made before production stopped due to WW2.

=== M33 ===
After WW2 the M20 and M21 side-valves were marketed for use with sidecars. To offer more power for the sidecar user, BSA fitted the 500cc OHV engine from the B33 into M20/21 frames to form the M33. Introduced in 1948 with girder forks, telescopic forks were fitted in 1949. Plunger rear suspension was offered in 1951 and made standard in 1956. Production ended in August 1957.

=== M series Slopers ===
The BSA Sloper was first introduced in 1926. In its final iteration in 1933 the engine was enlarged to 595cc rated at 5.95 hp. Bore and stroke were 85×105 mm. The machine was available in either side-valve or OHV configurations. The side-valve was designated M33-10 and the OHV M33-11. Following BSA's model designation of the time, (Note: From 1932 to 1935 BSA model numbers consisted of three parts. They began with a letter for the model type, followed by the year and a suffix added with the position in that year's catalogue. The suffix was sequential starting from the smallest model. For example in 1933 the range ran from B33-1 (250cc) to G33-13 (1,000cc v-twin).) the side-valve became the M34-12 in 1934 and M35-10 in 1935, its final year of production. The OHV version was designated M34-13 in 1934 and M35-11 in 1935.

== Gallery ==
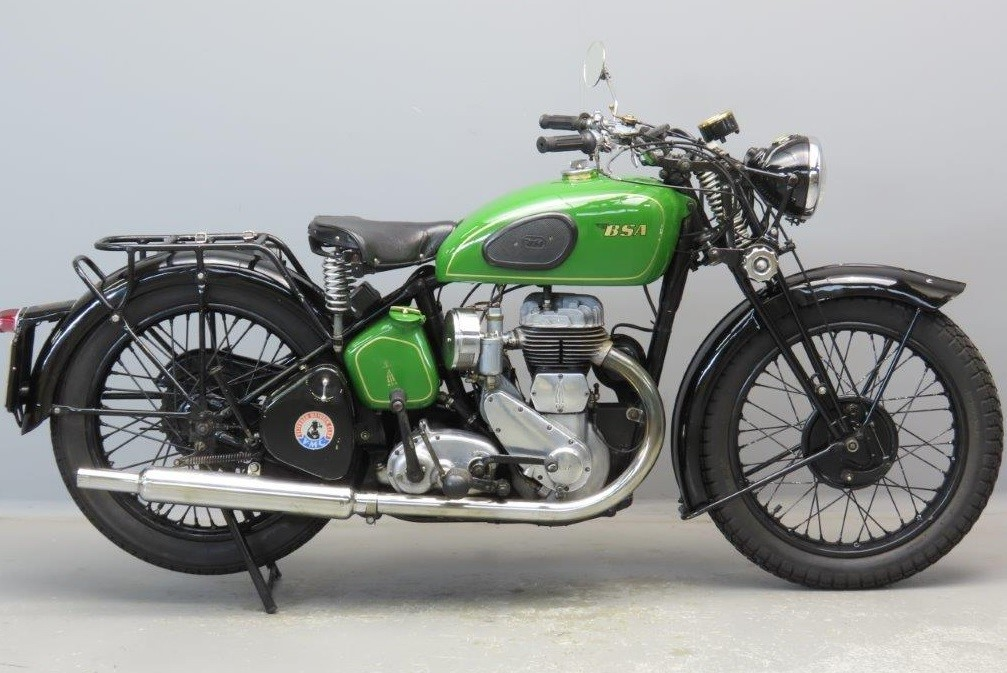
1939 M20

Army M20

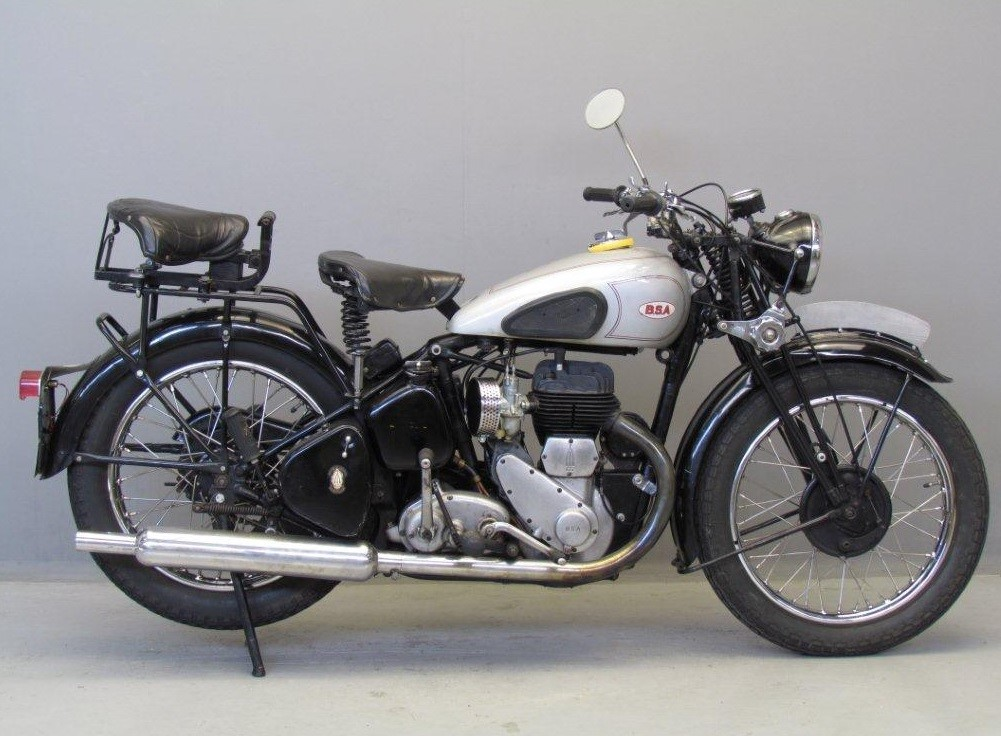
1936 M21

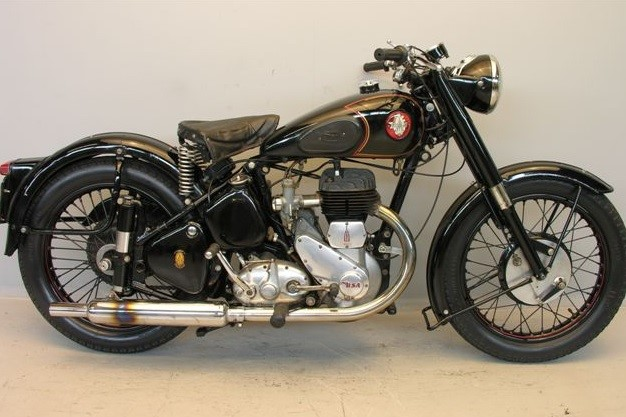
1956 M21 with telescopic forks and plunger suspension

1938 M22

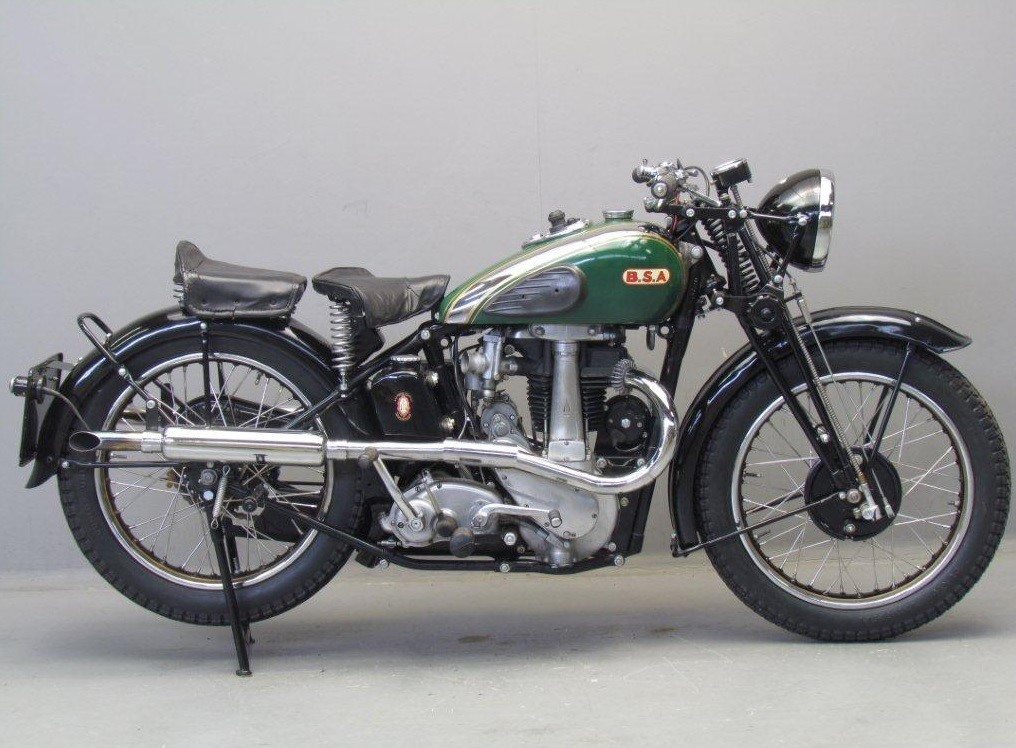
1938 M22 twin port

1938 M23 Empire Star

1939 M23 Silver Star

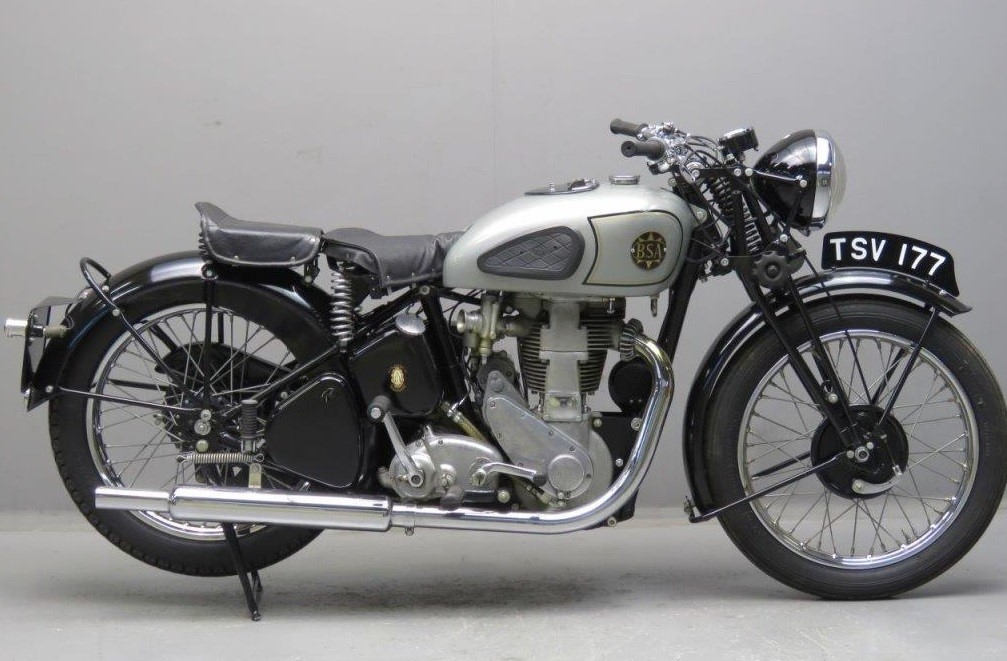
1939 M24 Gold Star

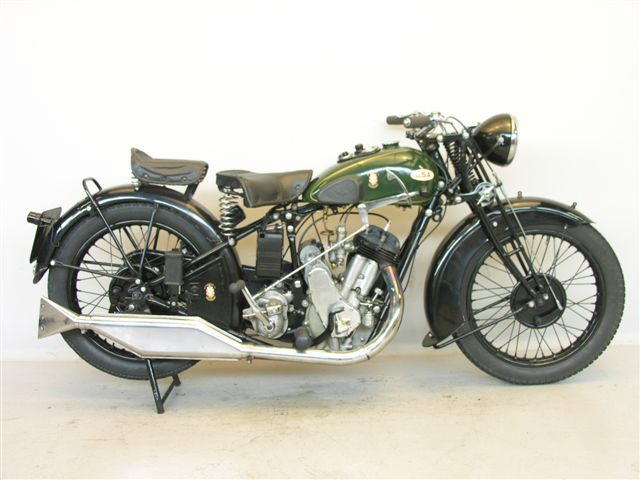
1933 M33-10 side-valve

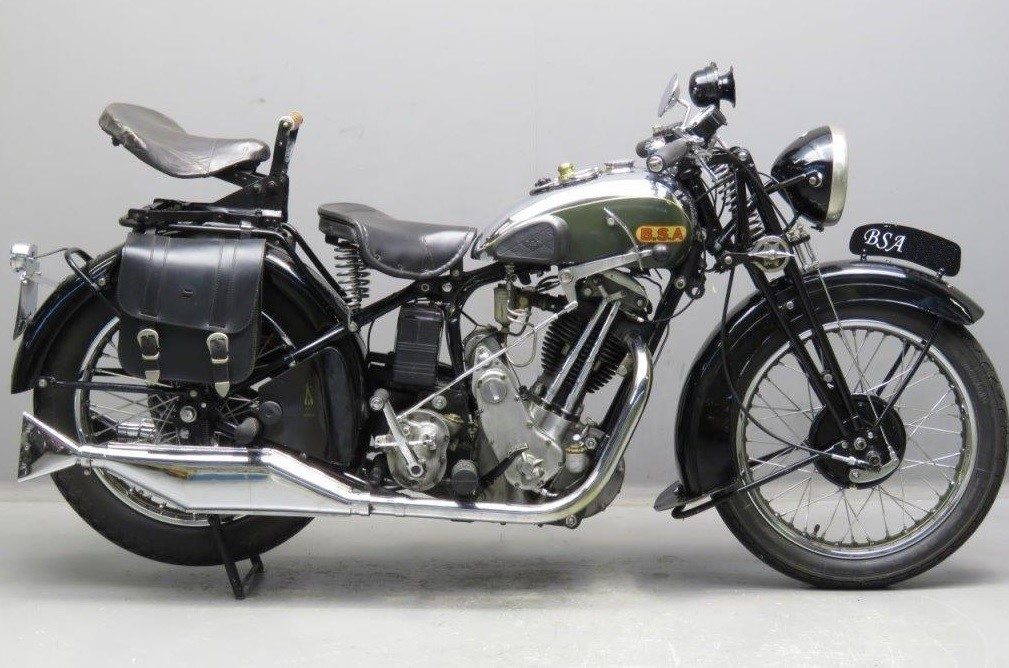
1933 M33-11 OHV
