= Acme motorcycle (1939–1949) =

Defunct Australian motorcycle manufacturer

The Acme motorcycle was assembled and marketed by Bennett & Wood of Wentworth Avenue, Sydney, who also built Speedwell bicycles and were also BSA importers for New South Wales. The engine was a Villiers 122cc Mark 9D, and the frame was built locally. The bike was aimed at city commuters as a cheap and economical mode of transport. Production began in May 1939, and was phased out in 1949, due to the success of the imported BSA Bantam. The Acme, along with the Waratah, were the only two Australian-made motorcycles whose production span was before and after World War II.

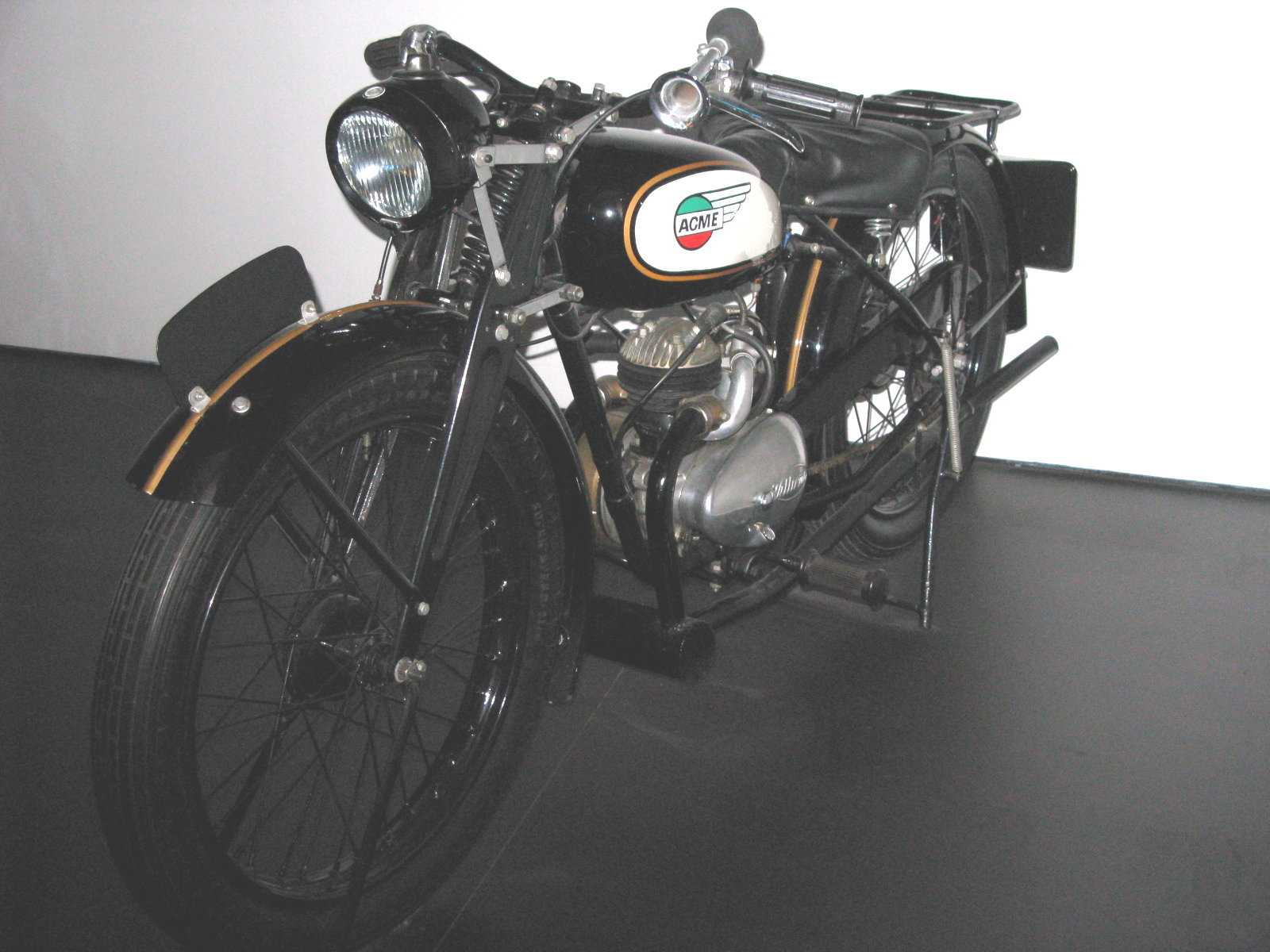
1939 Acme 125cc

== See also ==
- List of motorcycles of the 1930s
- List of motorcycles of the 1940s
