= DKW SS 350 =

SS 350
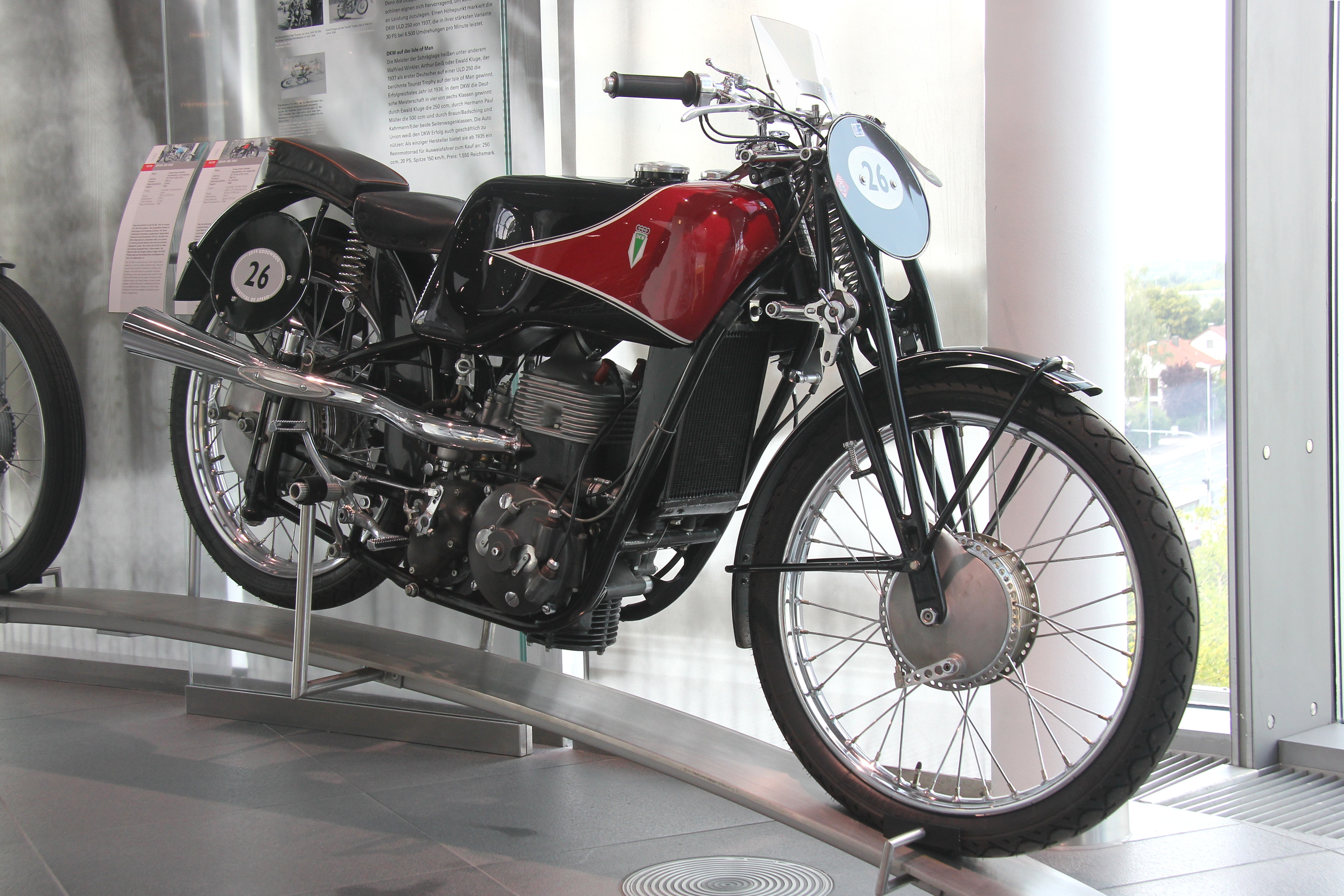
- Manufacturer: DKW
- Production: 1935
- Class: Racing motorcycle
- Engine: water-cooled, 2-stroke, 2-piston twin with supercharger
- Bore / stroke: 39.5 mm x 68.5 mm
- Power: 34 bhp

The DKW SS 350 was a racing motorcycle. 1935 saw the introduction of Dampf-Kraft-Wagen's first "over the counter" racer with the announcement of the SS 250 at that year's Berlin Show. The model was quickly followed by a 350 cc version, the SS 350, which drew on the works team's experience.

== Features ==
In the (very limited) production application the water-cooled engine retained the vertical cylinder but placed the crank driven supercharger piston and its cylinder under the crankcases. The radiator was mounted between the twin downtubes of the plunger suspended double cradle frame and drive was taken to the four speed gearbox via a chain primary drive and dry multidisc clutch. Girder forks equipped the front end and were fitted with a full-width hub as was the rear wheel.

== Engine ==
In its 1939, 350 cc form, the SS engine had a bore of 39.5 mm for each of the two pistons and a stroke of 68.5 mm, which with the aid of the supercharger resulted in a claimed power output of 32 bhp (24 kW). This compared very favourably with its rivals although the works 350US was reputedly producing 48 bhp (36 kW)

== See also ==
- Twingle

== See also ==
- List of motorcycles of the 1930s
- List of motorcycles by type of engine
