= AJS S3 V-twin =

British motorcycle, launched in 1931

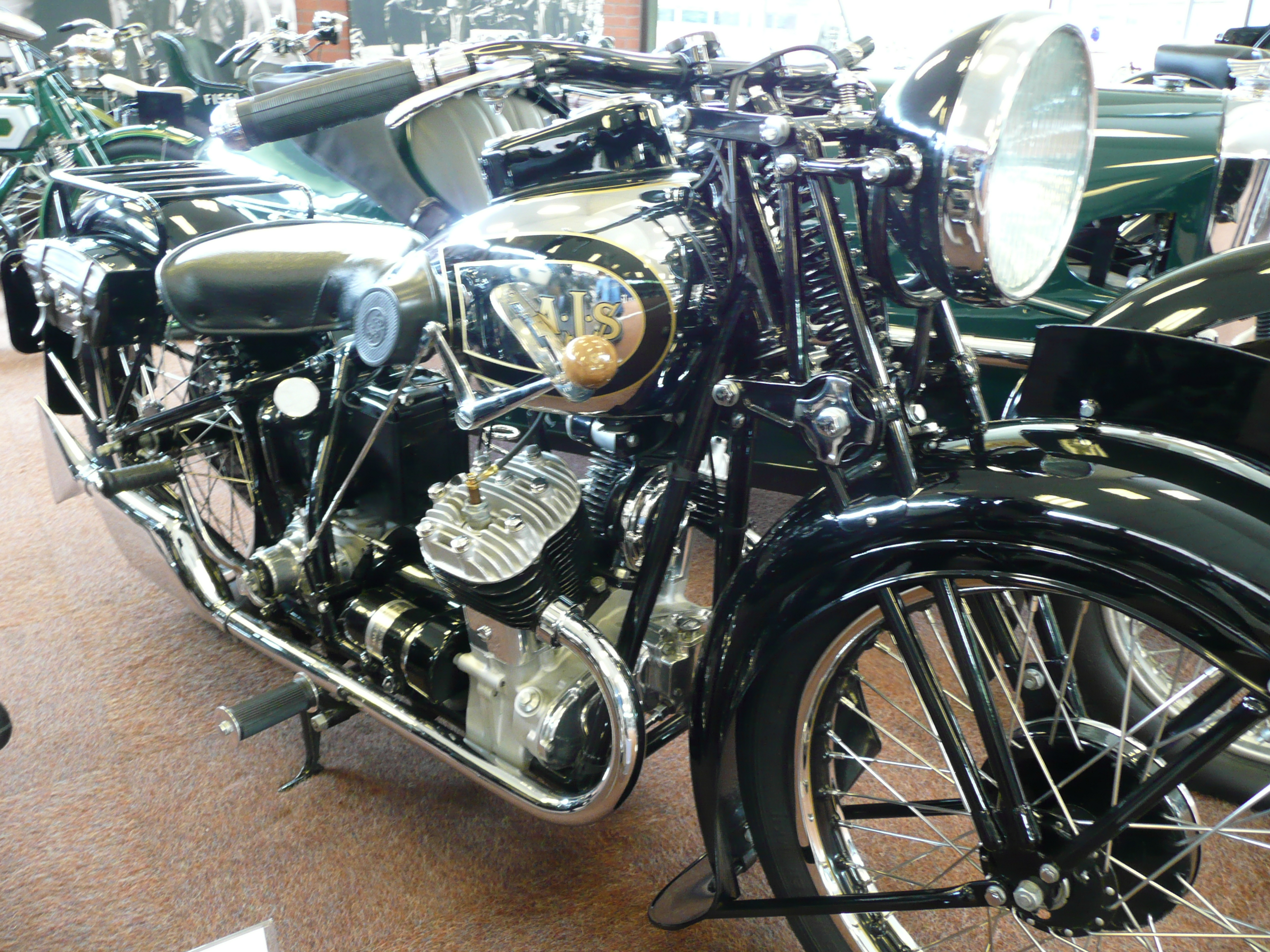
- Manufacturer: AJS
- Production: 1931
- Engine: 496 cc 50 degree air-cooled side-valve V-twin
- Top speed: 65 mph (105 km/h)
- Power: 4.98 bhp (3.71 kW)
- Transmission: Shaft primary drive with chain final drive
- Weight: 160 kg (350 lb) (dry)

The AJS S3 V-twin is a British motorcycle designed and built by the Wolverhampton, England company A. J. Stevens & Co. Ltd. Launched in 1931, the AJS S3 was a 496 cc transverse V-twin tourer with shaft primary drive (but chain final drive), three-speed bevel-driven gearbox and alloy cylinder heads. The 50 degree V configuration was effective for air cooling and with a tank top 'dashboard' was conceived as a luxury cruiser. It had been expensive to develop and at £65 was more expensive than the 1,000 cc (61 cu in) AJS of the same year, so the S3 did not sell in large numbers, and by the end of 1931 AJS had gone into liquidation and been taken over by Matchless motorcycles who discontinued production.

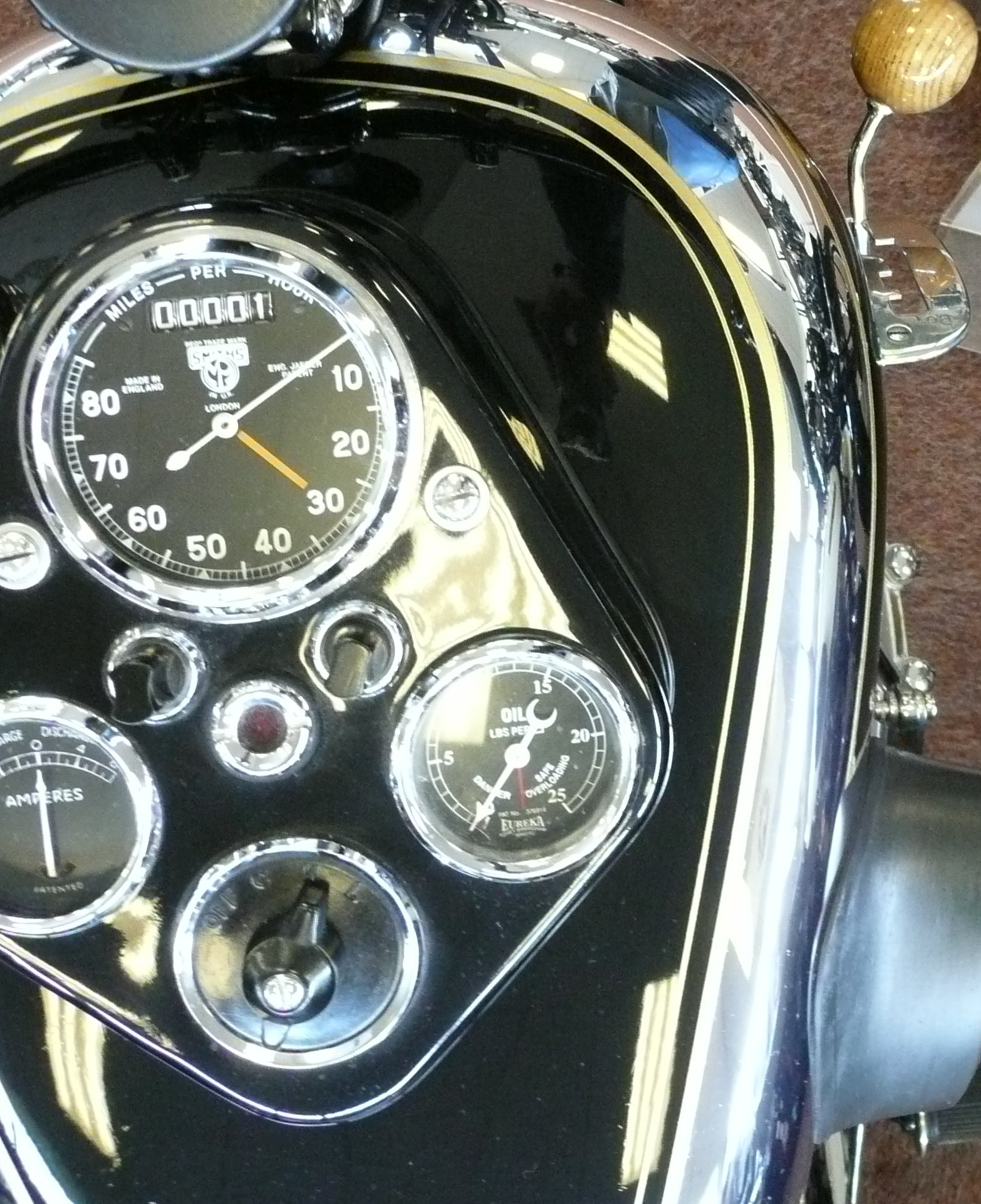
Rider's view of the S3 instruments

== See also ==
- List of motorcycles of the 1930s
