= Excelsior Manxman =

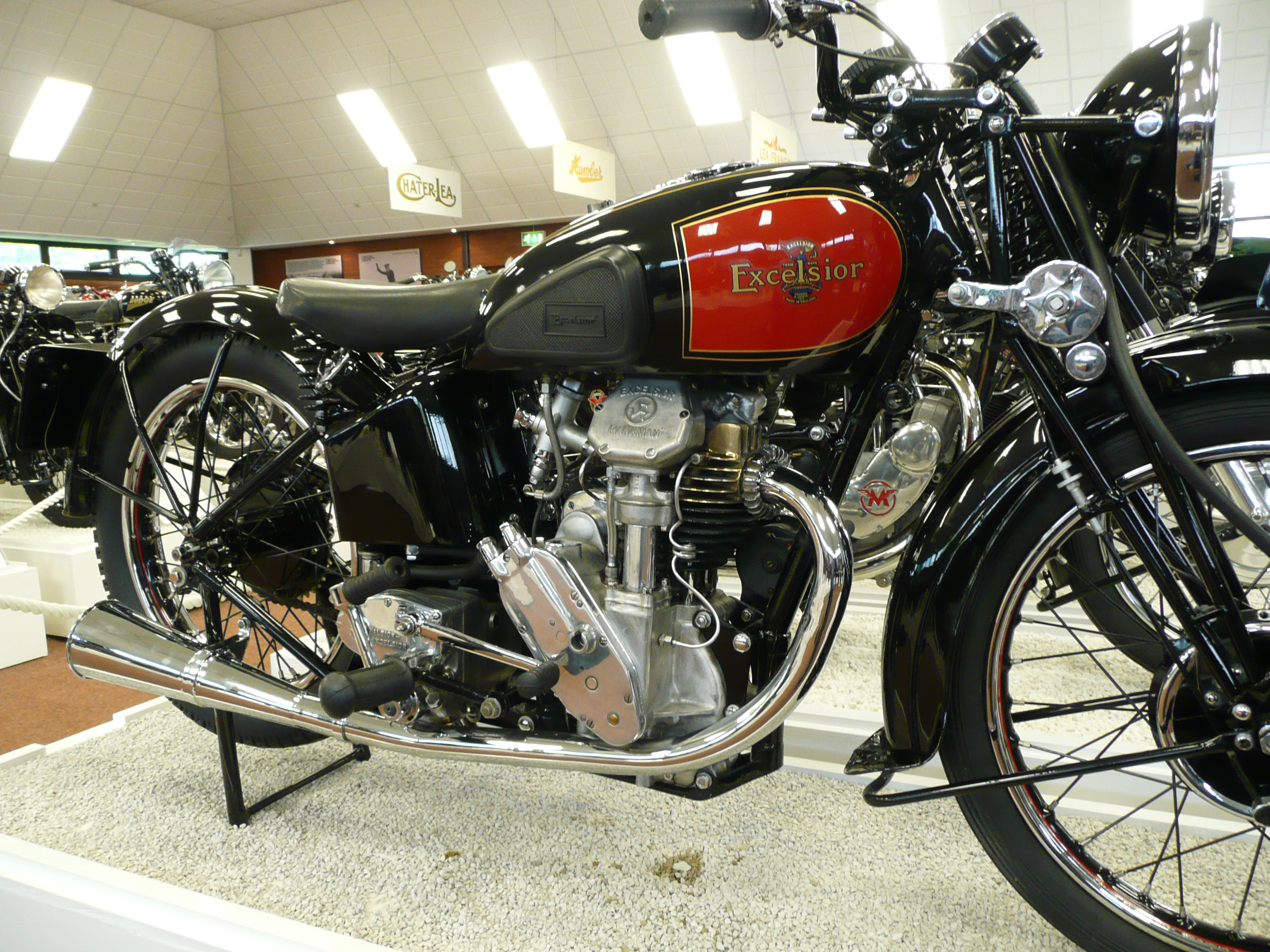
- Manufacturer: Excelsior Motor Company, Birmingham
- Production: 1934-1939
- Predecessor: Marvel
- Engine: 250cc, 350cc and 500cc SOHC singles
- Top speed: 80 mph (130 km/h)
- Power: 23 bhp (17 kW) @ 6000 rpm
- Transmission: Four speed gearbox to chain final drive
- Suspension: Girder front forks
- Brakes: Drum
- Weight: 250:132 kilograms (291 lb), 350:152 kilograms (335 lb) (dry)

The Manxman was a motorcycle designed and built by H. J. Hatch and Eric Walker of the Excelsior Motor Company in Tyseley, Birmingham. Although it never won the Isle of Man TT, the Manxman was a very popular and reliable motorcycle which was successful in international racing and the Manx Grand Prix. Production was halted by World War II and did not resume.

== Development ==
The Excelsior Motor Company did not make engines before World War II so Excelsior's Eric Walker worked in partnership with Blackburne's Ike Hatch, building on ideas developed by Rudge motorcycles on four valve engines to develop an entirely new twin camshaft design with pushrod operated valves that they called the 'mechanical marvel'. This was planned as the power unit for a new motorcycle to be called the Marvel and the prototype won the 1933 lightweight TT.

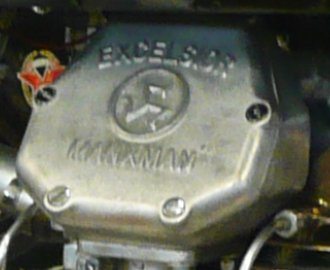

It was decided however, that this engine was too complicated for mass production so the team developed a simpler two valve single overhead cam configuration in 250cc, 350 and 500cc capacities which were all marketed as the Manxman and had the Isle of Man emblem on the engine casing and a bronze cylinder head. Although riders found it heavy, the Manxman handled well and was very reliable - if a bit over engineered.

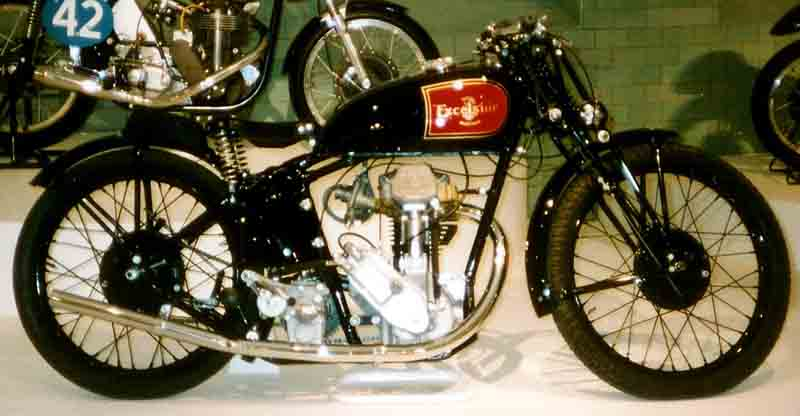
Excelsior Manxman 250 cc 1935

Road and race versions were produced but the 500 was only ever marketed as a sports roadster. In 1936 a four valve version was developed and won second place in the 1936 and 1937 Lightweight TT races. The Manxman also became a popular choice for the independent TT racers or privateers who went on to achieve many wins until World War II stopped them racing. In 1937 the company developed a shorter-stroke 250 engine and an aluminium-alloy cylinder head with right-hand exhaust port.

== See also ==
- List of motorcycles of the 1930s
