= Abendsonne =

Abendsonne was a motorcycle manufactured in Darmstadt, Germany, in 1933-1934 by Georg Wessbinder. The most unusual feature was the coupling of two 98cc Villiers engines to make a 196cc twin-cylinder engine. Very few were made.
