= New Imperial Model 76 =

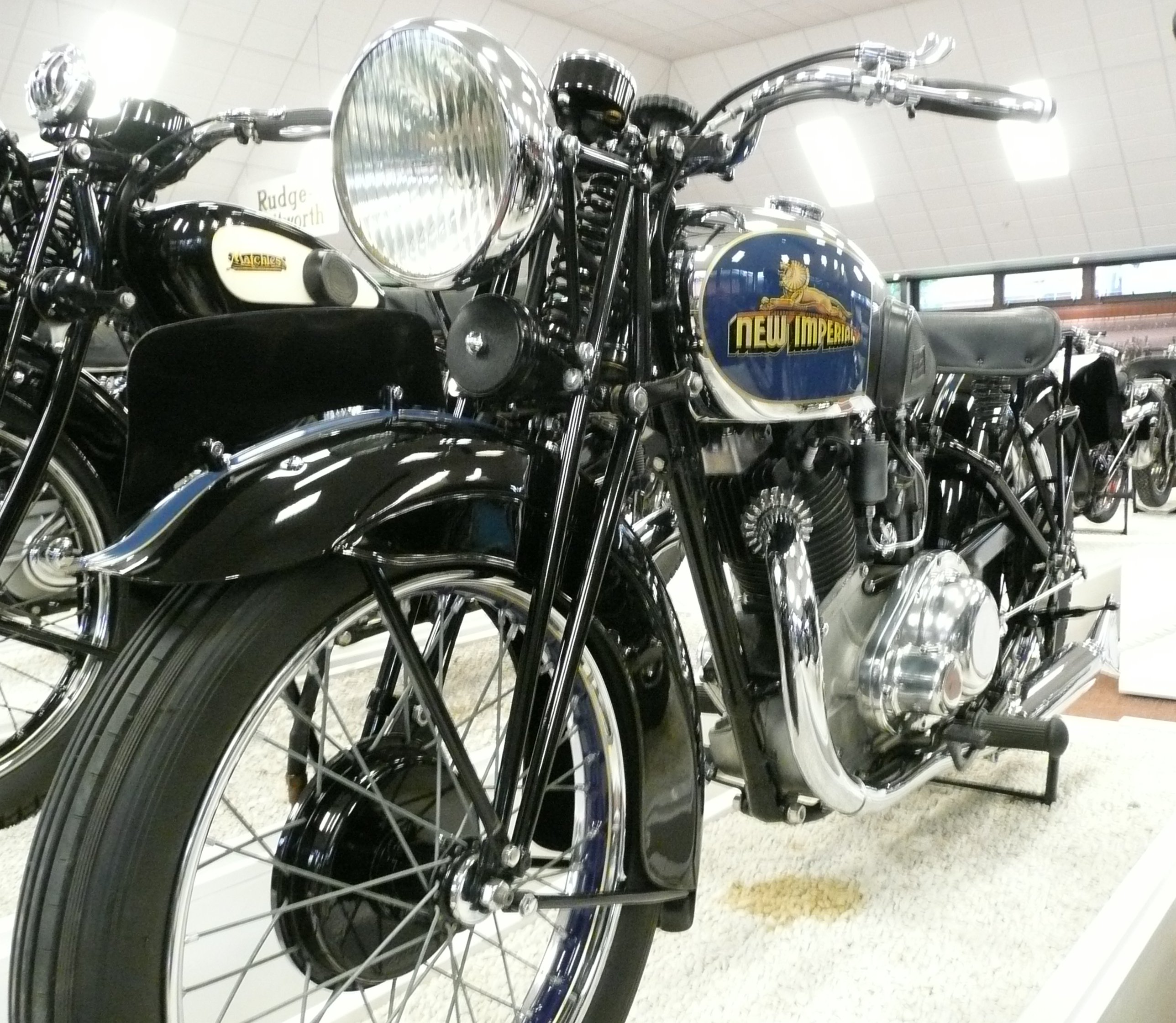
- Manufacturer: New Imperial Motors Ltd
- Production: 1936–1939
- Engine: 496 cc (30.3 cu in) OHV four stroke [single ]

The Model 76 was a New Imperial Motors Ltd motorcycle from England, marketed under the slogan "The King of Motors" between 1936 and 1939, when the company was turned over to wartime production.

== Development ==
In the mid-1920s New Imperial were producing 300 machines a month and continuing to expand the Great Depression of the early 1930s. Like many manufacturers of the time, New Imperial found it very difficult to maintain sales through the 1930s and even Bob Foster’s win on a unit-construction model in the 1936 Isle of Man TT (the last time that Great Britain won a Lightweight TT) failed to lead to the much needed sales.

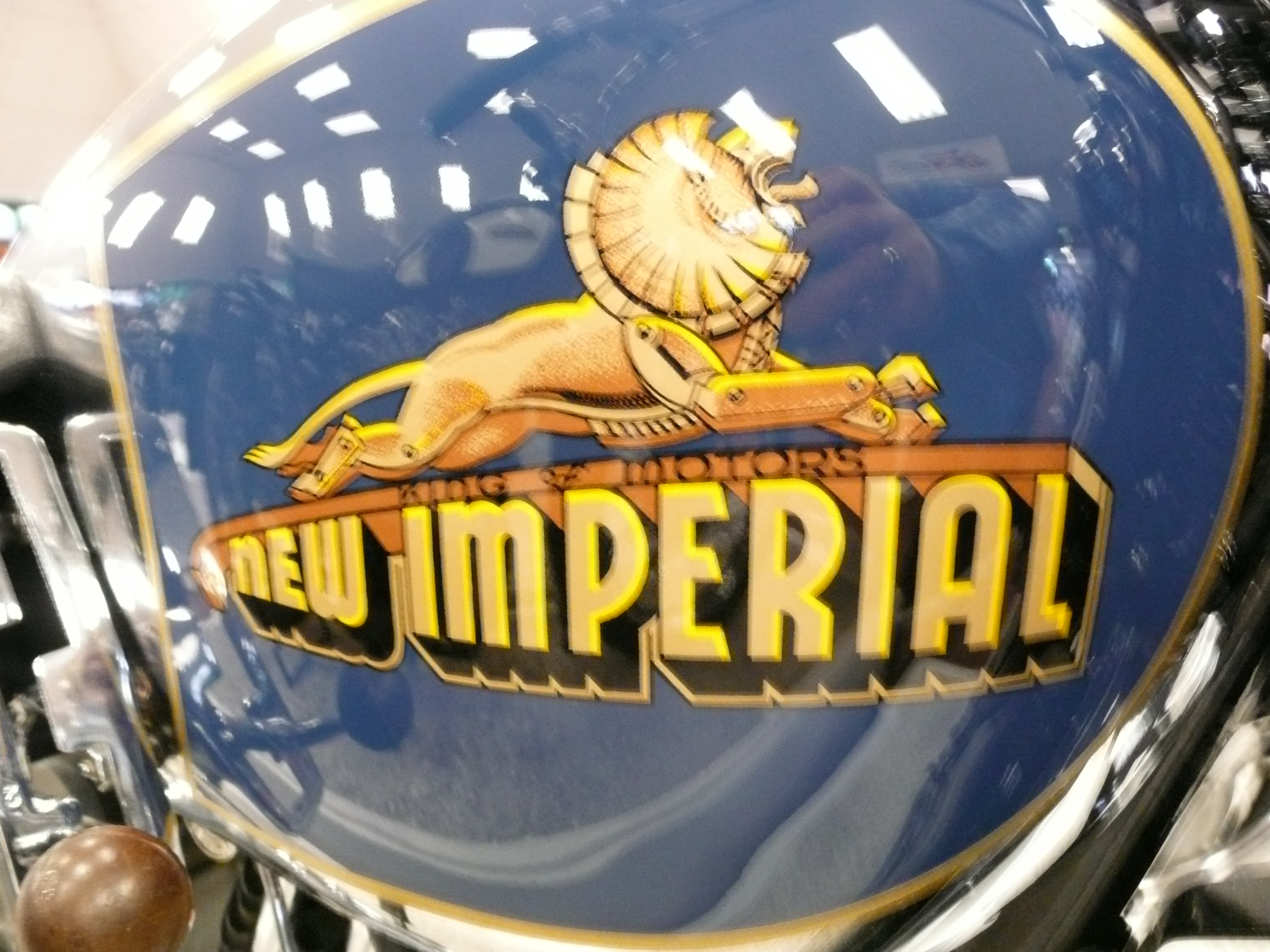

Following the TT win all 1937 models were designed with the same pioneering unit construction engine, although the design was modified so that there were separate compartments within the unit for engine and gearbox.

The engine was a 496 cubic centimetres (30.3 cu in) overhead valve unit construction twin with a twin-port head. A range of different ignition systems options were offered the Model 76 was available in either standard trim, with a hand-operated four-speed gearbox, or from 1937 as a de-luxe version, with a foot-operated gearchange.

New Imperial ceased trading in 1938, and sold the company to Jack Sangster, owner of Ariel and Triumph motorcycles. Surviving examples prove that limited production continued even after the company was liquidated, however, being assembled from spare parts right up to the outbreak of war, when a former director of New Imperial, Solomon Joseph, negotiated the purchase of the company and moved the equipment to the Triumph works in Coventry to turn it to production for World War II and the Model 76 was finally discontinued.
