= Waratah motorcycles =

Australian motorcycle

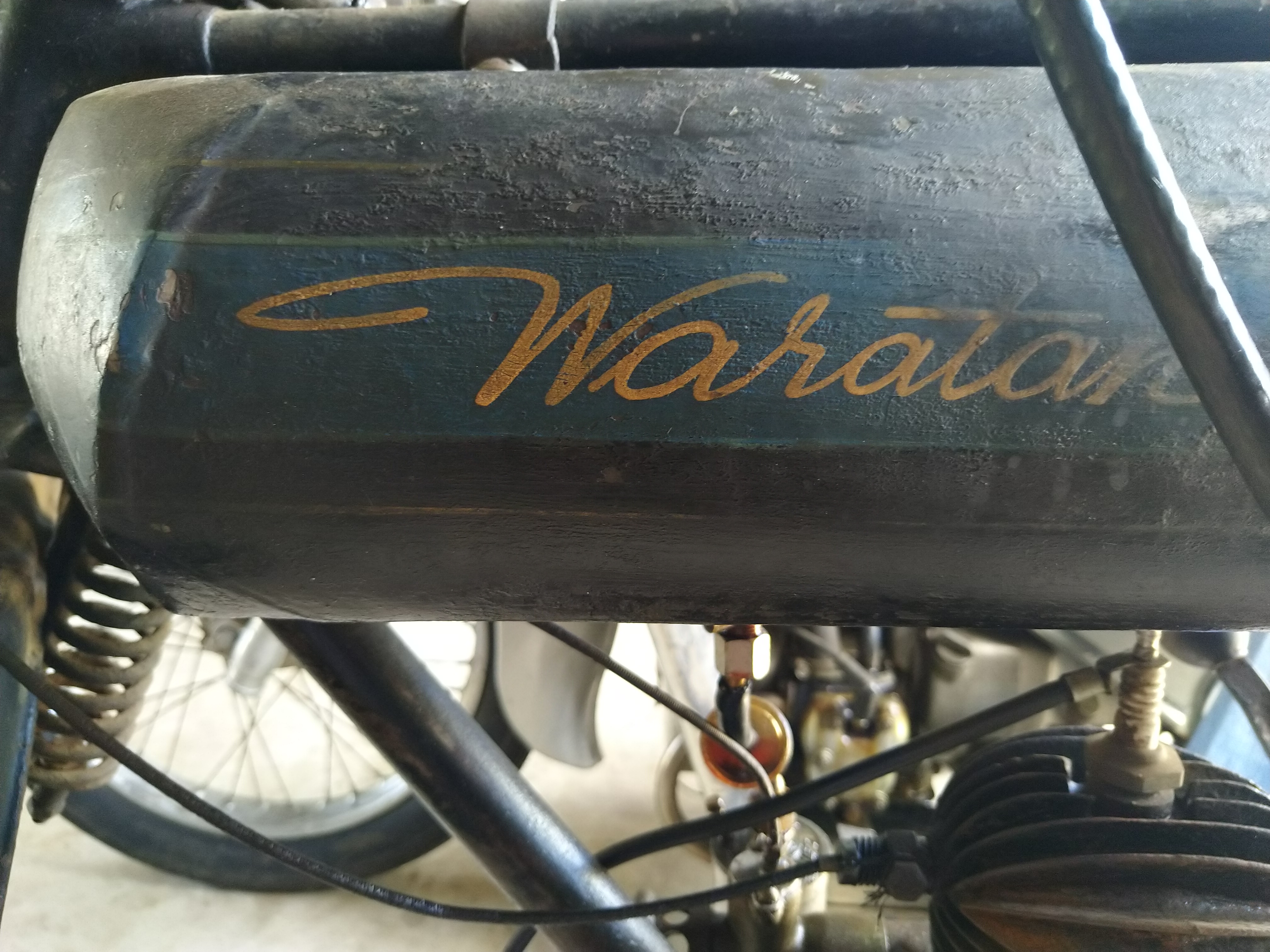
- Company type: Privately held company
- Industry: Motorcycle
- Headquarters: Sydney, Australia
- Products: Motorcycles

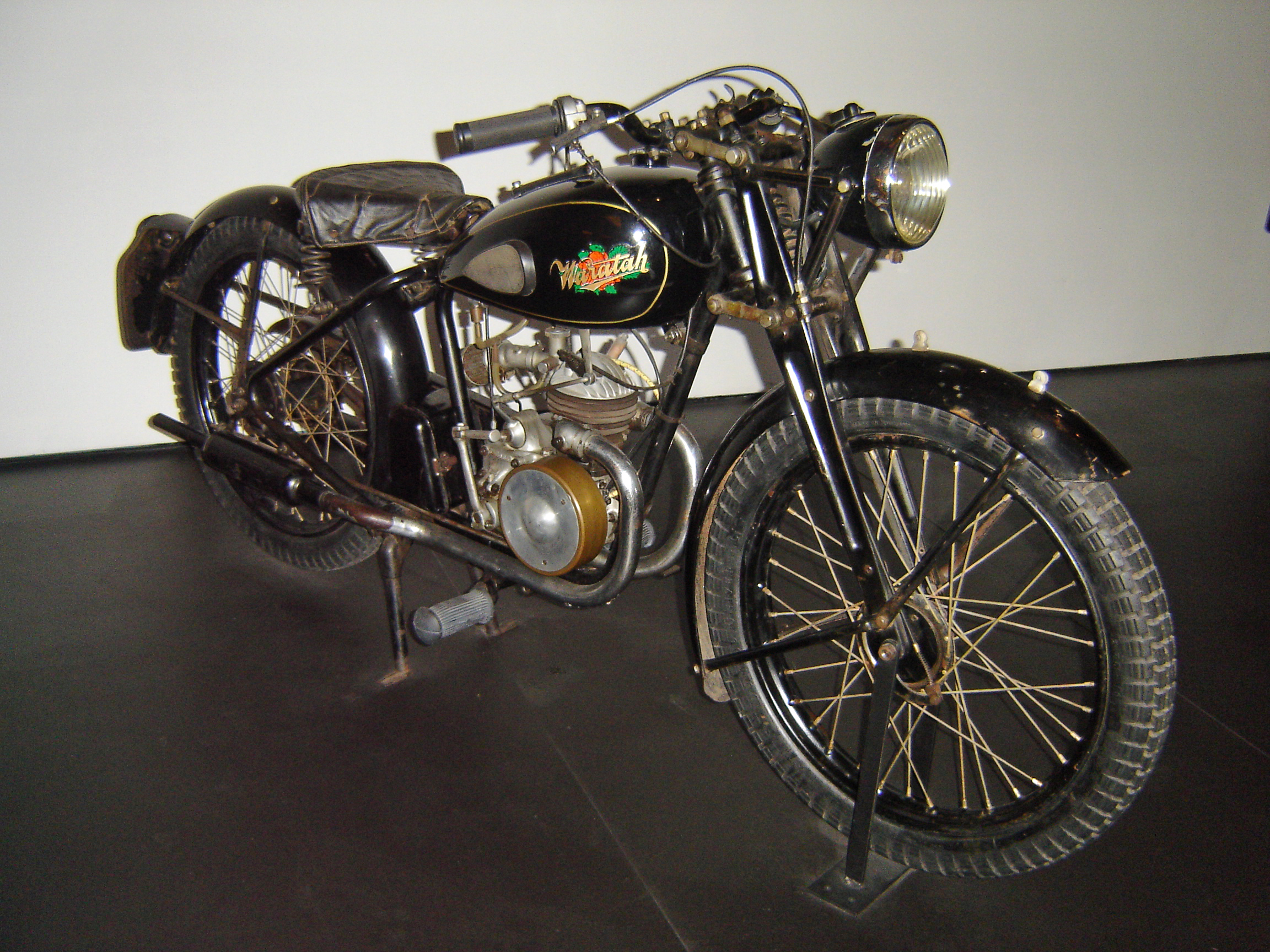
A 1948 125 cc Waratah motorcycle

Waratah motorcycles were manufactured in Sydney, Australia, from before 1911 to around 1948, although Waratah badged motorcycles were sold into the 1950s.

Initially Waratah motorcycles were manufactured by the Canada Cycle & Motor Agency, Ltd. on George Street, Sydney, who from at least 1910 built from standard parts, or rebadged BSA bicycles as, Waratah bicycles. W.A.Williams had been the manager of the Sydney branch of this business and in 1905 he bought it, retaining the name until 1913. In 1913 the bicycle and motorcycle part of the business was taken over by his sons, Perce and Reg, and the name was changed to Williams Bros., and later P&R Williams. This business, initially at 213–7 Elizabeth Street, Sydney, is widely known as the manufacturer of Waratah motorcycles from 1914 to 1948. Subsequent addresses of 255-259 Elizabeth St by the early 1920s, and 117 Goulburn St in the later 1920s are detailed in newspaper advertising, also detailing that the business changed its name to P.and R. Williams Pty Ltd, and later moved to 74-78 Wentworth Avenue Surry Hills.

Initially, they made small machines assembled from predominantly British components, including Villiers engines, Sun frames, Druid and Brampton forks. In fact, in 1921 they described themselves as sole importers of Villiers-Waratah Motor-Cycles. Fafnir and V.T.S. engines were also used.

In the later years (post World War II), they badge engineered using, it is believed, Norman and Excelsior machines.

They were Australia's longest running motorcycle manufacturer. However little information seems to have survived, presumably because these were low-value utility machines.

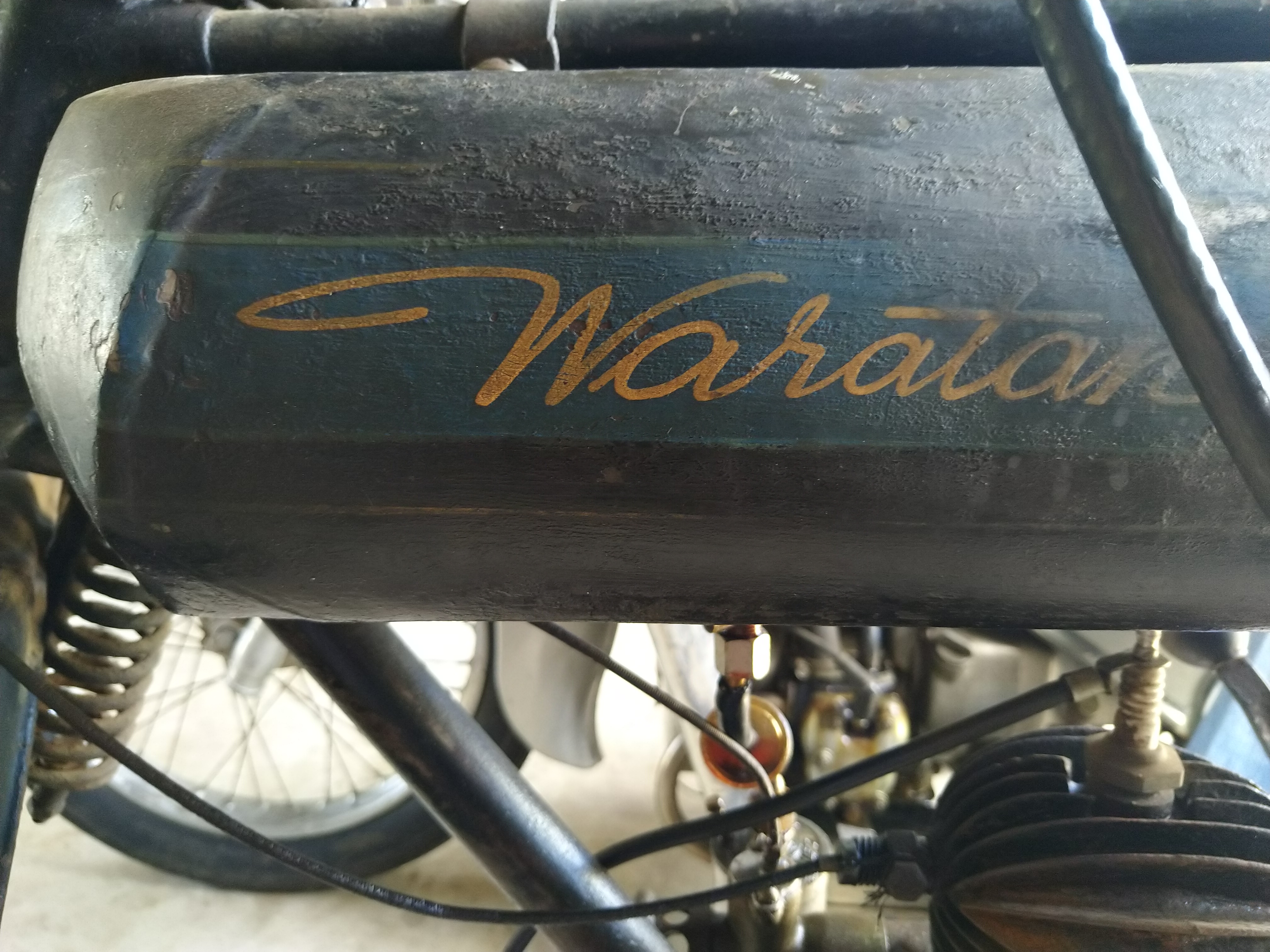
This registered and roadworthy 150 c.c. example was photographed in Western Queensland in January 2001.

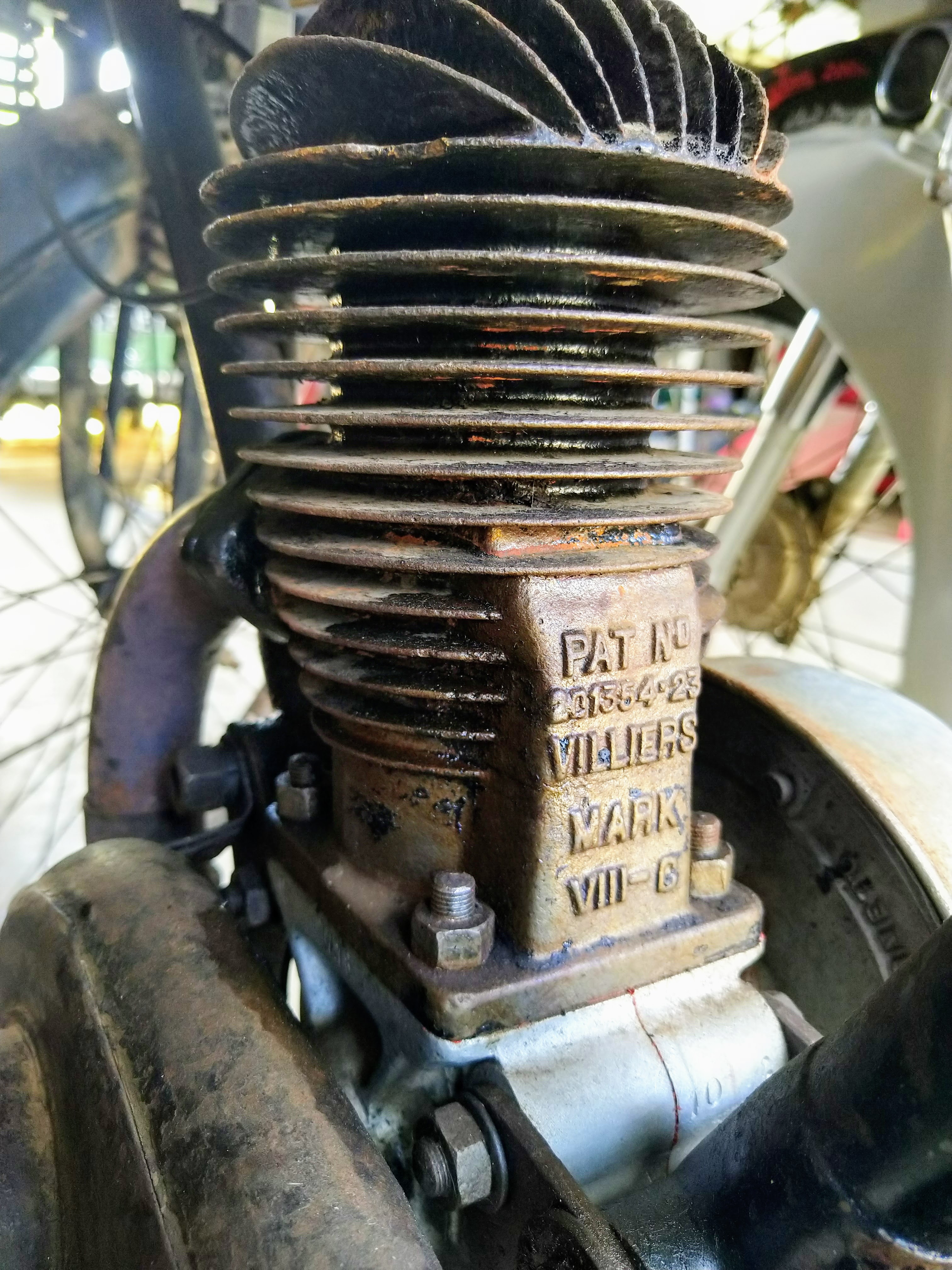
Mark VIII-C 150 c.c. engines were first fitted in 1924.

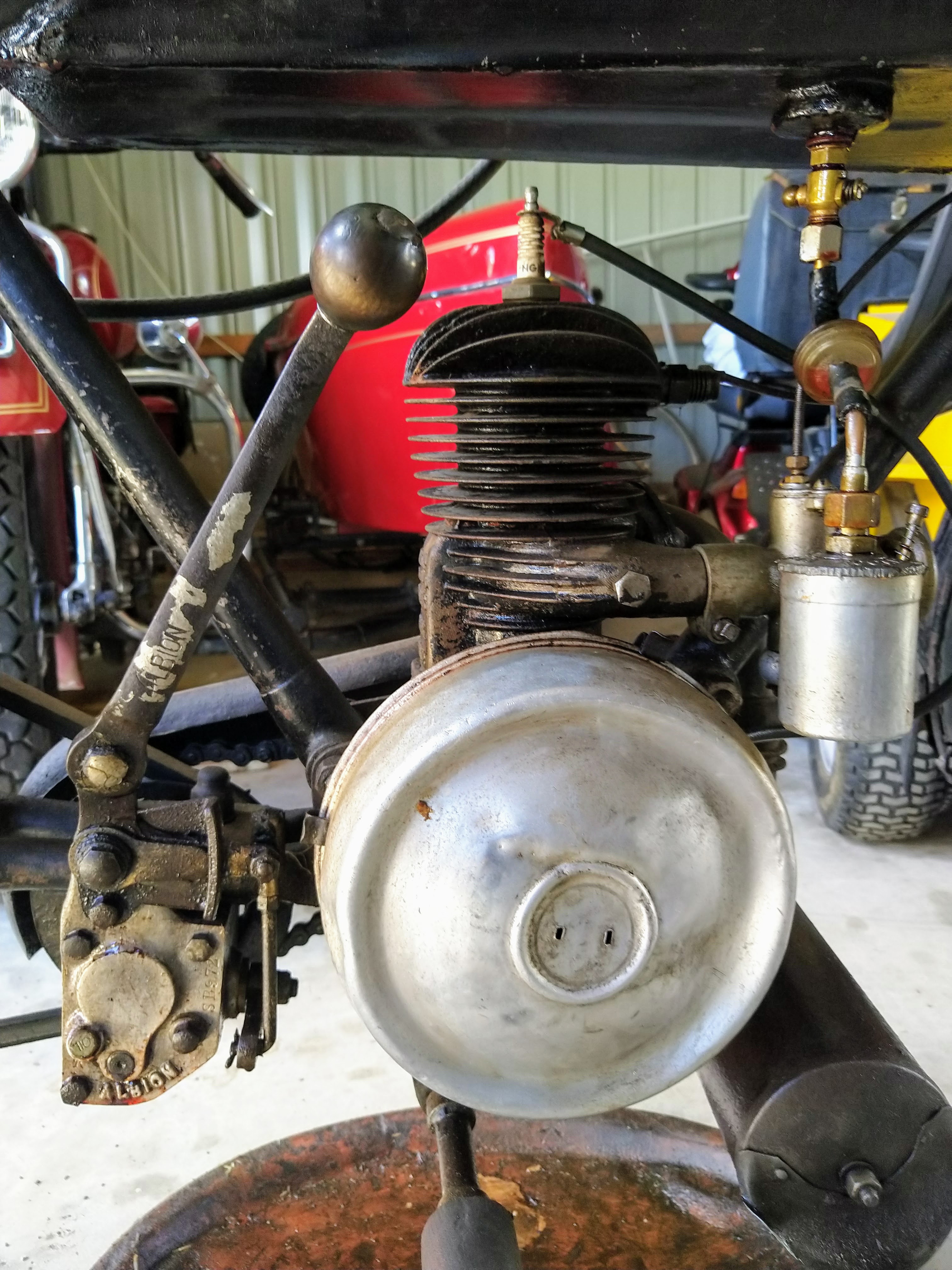
Gear shift lever.

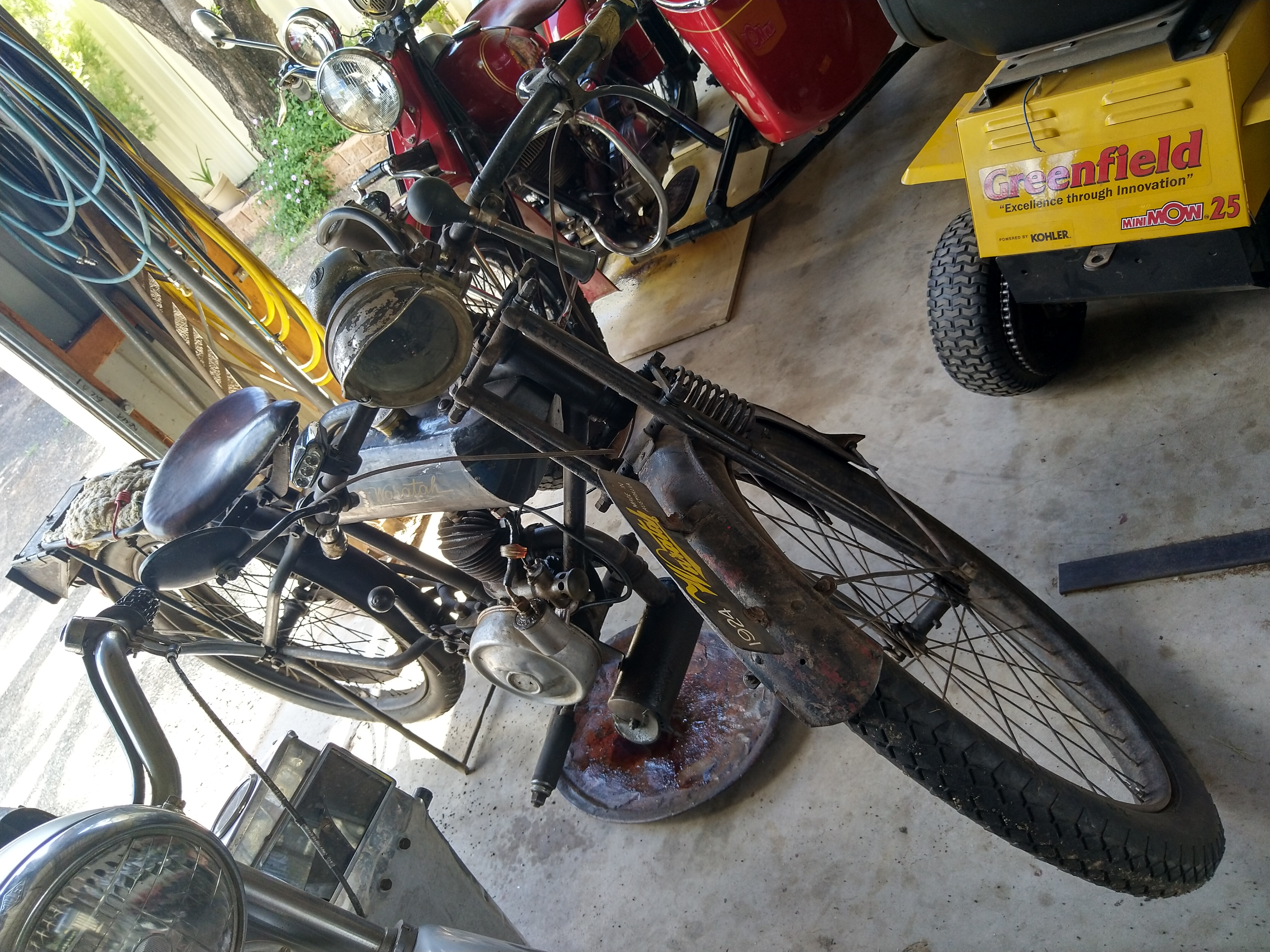
Acetylene burning front and rear lights on this registered, privately owned example are both serviceable.

== Models ==
There is no detailed definitive history of the Waratah models, but from books, press articles, sales brochures and adverts, the following outline picture seems clear:

- <1911 to 1913?: 4.5 hp model with a Fafnir engine
- 1914 to ~1930: 197 cc and 350 cc models, built from Villiers (and initially also V.T.S.) engines and various frames and forks.
- 1930s: 125 cc, 148 cc and 250 cc models, built from Villiers engines and various frames and forks.
- post-war: Badge engineered Norman (possibly) and/or Excelsior (almost certainly). Possibly there was also a Waratah autocycle.

More details are known for certain years:

Year	Models
1911	Waratah machine equipped with 4.5 hp Fafnir engine. The machine is described as being "English" suggesting that it is either manufactured from imported English components or possibly badge-engineered (although the Fafnir engine is German). Earlier adverts clearly indicate that it was manufactured not imported by the statement "MANUFACTURERS and IMPORTERS of Excelsior, Douglas, and Waratah Motor Cycles" since the first two were imported. The company was also manufacturing Waratah bicycles at the time. Adverts for these Waratah motorcycles appear to have run for only a fairly short time in late 1911, perhaps reflecting a limited availability of the machines themselves. An advertisement in 1916 selling a second-hand Waratah refers to it as "3.5 h.p. overhead valve, Bosch magneto". As this is clearly a 4-stroke engine and the later Villiers and V.T.S. machines were 2-strokes, this is most likely another early model, presumably with a Fafnir engine since they used on some engines overhead inlet and side exhaust valves.
1915	A model with a Villiers two-stroke engine was offered. It also seems that Waratah motorcycles were offered with V.T.S. engines. V.T.S. were manufactured by The Valveless Two Stroke Engine Company Ltd. of Birmingham, England, and sold exclusively to Sun Cycle & Fittings Co. Ltd. (whose frames were used on Waratah motorcycles). This was a 269cc engine. These machines, presumably with either make of engine, were available either with our without a two-speed gearbox.
1916	Models with Villiers and V.T.S. two-stroke engines were offered. One model, at least, was supplied with a 2-speed counter-shaft gearbox.
1917	Adverts in March describe apparently second-hand (so perhaps 1916 models) 2.5 hp Waratah machines. The former is described as having lamp, horn and tools. Williams Bros. also provide the following testimonial from their Tamworth Agent: "Mr. Pritchard, of Tamworth, who bought Waratah Motor Cycle off me some time ago (the same machine that I averaged 38 miles an hour on in the big road race) says he has ridden his Waratah over 30,000 miles, and has never had a new ring or part flitted, except two new chains and tyres. He still has the original belt, and the machine is still in first-class running order."
1919	Adverts refer to a new, and what is presumably a second-hand two-speed, 1919 Waratah.
1921	Reports on a race meeting mention a 2.75 hp Waratah machine. Whilst it may not be from 1921, it is presumably not much older if it is in competition.
1922	Reports on race meetings mention 2.25 hp Waratah machines less than 600 cc and 2.75 hp Waratah machines with less than 350 cc. Whilst they may not be from 1922, they are presumably not much older if they are in competition.
1924	A 1.5 h.p., two-speed Waratah was offered. There are reports that mention 1.5 hp Waratah machines, which are probably the same model. Auction sales also mention 2.5 hp Waratah machines, although they may also be of earlier manufacture. An advert in the Townsville Daily Bulletin describes a Waratah machine with a Villiers Two-Stroke engine and two speed gearbox that gives 110 mpg and that "easily climbs Stanton Hill on top gear". The advert shows a picture of a machine with enclosed primary chain and a belt drive to the rear wheel, an angular fuel tank slung under the top frame tube, no obvious electrics and no suspension other than seat springs.
1925	Reports on a race meeting mention a 1.5 hp Waratah machine. Whilst it may not be from 1925, it is presumably not much older if it is in competition and that it is the current stock model is implied by subsequent advertising. The existence of this 1.5 hp Waratah model is confirmed by other advertisements. This model had a Villiers engine and was apparently capable of 30 mph. and 140 mpg. (However, one advertisement seems to indicate it was 1.25 hp and another refers to 40 mph.)
1926	At least two models were offered: A 1.5 hp model was reported to deliver 140 mpg. It was also stated that "Rated at 1.5 hp the Waratah engine develops over 4 Brake Horse Power." It had a two speed gearbox, with an optional clutch and kick starter. This was presumably the 147 cc model that was exhibited at the Sydney Motor Show. A 147 cc, 1.5 hp Waratah also took part in the sixth annual six- days' trials of the Motor Cycle Club of New South Wales.; A 3.5 hp model may have been new this year. The standard bike had a pump and full tool kit. A gas lighting set and horn was optional.
1927	A Waratah model equipped with three speed gear box, electric light and horn was offered. A 1.5 hp Waratah was offered as a "low priced machine which is proving very popular amongst motor cycling enthusiasts requiring a machine of exceptionally low upkeep." A 1927 advert refers to a, presumably second-hand and thus probably pre-1927, 2.75 h.p. Waratah.
1928	Two models were offered: 1.5 hp Villiers engined machine, possibly 197 cc or 147 cc. Probably single top tube Sun lightweight frame and lightweight Druid forks.; 2.5 hp Villiers engined machine, possibly 350 cc. Sun saddle tank frame and Brampton forks.; A classified advert from 1930 refers to a 2.75 h.p. Waratah.
1929	At least two models were offered as described in several (apparently promotional) press articles typically detailing improvements over the previous year's models: The "Utility" 1.5 hp 147 cc model which was "assembled in Sydney from British components" now had a heavier frame and a saddle tank finished with a red panel. A three speed gearbox with clutch and starter were fitted. Wheels were larger being 26 x 2.5 and both were fitted with 5in. diameter internal brakes. Villiers electric lighting was fitted as standard. There was "positive handlebar anchorage twist grip control", long nickel exhaust pipes and soft top saddle. The quoted fuel efficiency is 160 mpg, with other running costs being negligible.; The larger, 2.5 hp sports model was of the same construction but had a two-gallon petrol tank, separate oil tank and 25 x 3.25 well-base tyres. It had the 2.5 hp, 247 cc sports Villiers engine with twin ports and detachable aluminium cylinder head. Apparently it was an excellent hill climber and fast, and was capable of 55 mph. It was fitted with a three speed gearbox, clutch and kick starter, twin long nickel exhaust pipes and had 6V electrics, including a battery. It was fitted with a separate oil tank and had larger brakes than the 1.5 hp model. The existence of the 1929 2.5 hp model is also attested to by a later advert. (The suggestion that the 2.5 hp model was added to the range in 1929 does not seem reliable, and may relate solely to availability from the Queensland agent.); Other (also apparently promotional) press coverage provided more detail, but without being explicit about which model, perhaps it applies to both: "The 1929 model Waratah is a machine which is obviously suited to the utility rider, as it possesses not only the characteristic qualities of two-stroke construction, but is exceptionally well equipped in all ways. The front fork spring action, for example, is particularly long and flexible; the saddle tank design gives a low and safe riding position, which is further improved by the soft top saddle. General completeness, such as a cushion drive shock absorber, as well as automatic lubrication, twist grip control, balloon tyres, front and rear thumb adjusting brakes, &c., all indicate that the manufacturers realise that the utility rider wants something more than economy and light weight. The performance of the engine, too, is much better than would be expected with a machine of this class, as it is capable of high maximum speed, although these qualities of speed do not in any way affect the smooth running and slow top-gear performance of the machine." As in some previous years there is reference to a 350 which might be one of the above, but is probably a separate model. There is also mention, in a classified advert, of a 1929–30 2.75 hp machine with electrics.
1930	A 1.5 hp machine with a claimed 120 mpg was offered. This model with electrics and a suggested 140 mpg is also mentioned. A 2.5 hp 2-port machine with electrics was offered.
1931	A classified advert refers to a 1.75 hp Waratah.
1932	A machine fitted with a 147 cc Villiers two stroke engine was available. The following description is from (apparently promotional) press coverage describing improvements over the previous year's model. "These machines are totally redesigned, having visible top rail, tapering away under the saddle, and giving exceptionally low riding position, and gaining very high ground clearance." The front forks had enclosed webbing, apparently to strengthen them. It was fitted with electric light, battery and dimmer. Petrol consumption was approximately 150 mpg. Reports mention a 2.5 hp Waratah in the 350 cc limit class. Whilst it may not be from 1932, it is presumably not much older if it is in competition. (A classified advert refers to a 1.75 hp Waratah. Whilst it does not state the year and can hardly be considered a reliable source, it is mentioned here for completeness.)
1933	Apparently three models were offered in this year: A 1.47 hp machine. (Also referred to as 1.5 hp); A 1.97 hp machine with a Villiers engine of semi-incline design. The transmission includes a three speed gearbox with all chain drive, clutch and kick-starter. A saddle tank was introduced in this year, finished in red and black, with the saddle let in at the end for rider comfort. Wellbase wheels were fitted with 25 x 3.00 tyres together with internal expanding brakes. Forks were of central spring type. A six volt Lucas electric lighting system comprised battery, generator, headlamp and tail light. Speeds between 55 and 60 mph and fuel consumption of 150 mpg were supposed to be attainable.; A 2.5 hp machine.; One of these models (presumably the 2.5 hp machine) was described as a 250 cc machine.
1935	Two models were offered. The following descriptions are from (apparently promotional) press coverage which asserts, clearly erroneously, that until this time only the smaller "utility" model had been available.: Model "150" 1.5 hp Villiers engine of long stroke. Capable of 30 mph. and 120 mpg. Apparently uprated over the earlier utility 1.5 hp models with Villiers carburettor, magneto and electric lighting system. A four-pole generator, replacing an earlier two pole version, ensured a more powerful beam of light from the headlamp at low engine speeds. It had single spring front forks and a rubber saddle. Transmission was via a three speed gearbox with clutch and kick-starter. The tank (enlarged in this new version) held 1.75 gallons and the machine was fitted with leg-shields as standard.; Model "250" 2.5 hp machine capable of 60 mph. with more robust frame and forks and more powerful headlamp. The sporting engine had double ports and an alloy head, stated to develop 10 hp from a 2.5 hp unit. Other specifications were similar to the smaller model, except for twin silencers.; Presumably the Model "150" was the 148 cc two-stroke Waratah that was offered.
1936	A 148 cc two-stroke Waratah was offered. This is probably the 1.5 hp machine. A 2.5 hp two stroke machine capable of 90 mpg. was offered. "Electrics" were either standard, or an option.
1937	Two lightweight Villiers engined models (150 and 250) were offered in Brisbane and described as "undoubtedly one of the most economical motor cycles in the world". In Sydney, at least, a third model, a 1.25 hp machine was offered, described as "unit construction".: 1.25 hp machine.; Model 150, capable of 50 mph.; Model 250, capable of 60 mph. This is presumably the 2.5 hp model.; A 125 c.c. machine was apparently available. Presumably this is one of these machines, most likely the 1.25 hp. Reference to a 1.5 hp Waratah makes this seem quite likely. There is a (not exactly authoritative) reference to a 2 h.p. two-stroke Waratah.
1938	Models offered included: 1.25 hp two-stroke machine, 1.5 hp Villiers machine, capable of 100 mpg.; 2.5 hp machine.; A 150 cc machine was available (presumably the 1.5 hp machine). It had a foot change. A 250 cc machine was available (presumably the 2.5 hp machine) and a foot change was either standard or an option. A 2.25 hp machine is referred to in a classified advert, but this seems unlikely to be reliable.
1939	Two models, both lightweight, with Villiers engines, intended for utility work and described as "Undoubtedly one of the most economical motor cycles in the world": 150 model; 250 model; One of these models (presumably the 150) was also described as a 1.5 hp two-stroke Waratah. Another (presumably the 250) was described as a 2.5 hp Waratah. There are also references to a 1.25 hp machine capable of 150 mpg.
1940	Apparently at least three models were offered: 1.25 hp two-stroke machine. It was described as being of unit construction, fitted with a speedo and capable of 130–140 mpg.; 1.5 hp machine.; 2.5 hp two-stroke machine.; One of these, presumably the 2.5 hp, was known as the 250.
1941	At least two models were offered: A 1.5 hp two-stroke machine. It was capable of 100 mpg and a speedo and generator were fitted (or at least were options).; A 2.5 hp machine.
1942	A 1.25 hp machine was offered.
1943	A 1.25 hp two-stroke machine was offered.
1944	A 2.5 hp two-stroke machine was offered.
1948	A 125 cc machine was offered. A 1.5 hp machine was offered.
1949	A 2 hp machine was offered.
~1949	Two main models were offered, the "125" and the "197": Model "125": Villiers 10D, 122 cc, 1.25 hp engine.; Model "197": Villiers 6E, 197 cc, 2 hp engine; They were both offered in "R" and "D" versions: "D": Battery-less Villiers direct lighting system; "R": Constant power lighting system with rectifier, wet battery and electric horn.; There was also a Model "125" Two Speed, which was an ultra light utility machine, with an Excelsior Goblin MK. II engine.
1950	At least two models were offered: 125 cc two-stroke machine.; 200 cc two-stroke.
1951	At least four models were offered, all had Villiers two-stroke engines, "teledraulic" forks and spring frame: 125 cc 1.25 hp machine.; 197 cc "D" 2 hp machine.; 197 cc "R" 2 hp machine.; 125 cc 1.25 hp 2-speed machine.; Presumably the "D" and "R" designations were the same as in the ~1949 brochure. One of the 125 cc machines was also offered. One of the 197 cc variants was also offered as 200 cc.
1952	Waratah motorcycles still offered for sale

== Historical events ==
Year	Event
5 November 1921	L.Walsh entered a 2.75 Waratah in the Five Laps (Five miles five furlongs) Handicap organised by the Motor Cycle Club of New South Wales at Victoria Park in connection with the South Sydney Hospital Carnival.
28 January 1922	C.Pearce riding a Waratah (either 2.25 or 2.5 h.p.) came second in the 3-mile Motor Cycle Speed Race—Second Heat at the Highland Society of New South Wales sports event.
11 February 1922	S. William on a 2.25 hp Waratah finished the 212 mile, St. George Motor-Cycle Club's second annual 12 hours' reliability trial
25 November 1922	Both F. Williams and L. Walsh were scheduled to compete 2.75 hp Waratahs in a Three Miles Handicap at the YMCA sports in Sydney. At the same event S. Williams was scheduled to compete on the same model in the Zig-zag Race. (The names Williams are surely not coincidental.)
1 January 1925	G. Davidson on a 1.5 hp Waratah was one (~23rd) of 25 riders (of 42 who started) to finish the 1004 mile, fourth annual six days' reliability trial of the Motor Cycle Club of New South Wales. He lost 130 points. The last to reach Sydney was S. M'Conkey, on one of the smallest machines which had ever competed in a longer event than a one-day trial in Australia. This was also a 1.5 hp Waratah. He reached Sydney at about 7 p.m. on the last day of the contest. M'Conkey put up such a fine performance in the face of adverse circumstances, that although he lost more points (308) than any other competitor, he was awarded a special consolation prize.
6 July 1925	S. W. Moran took first place in a race which was held under the auspices of the Goulburn Motor Cycle Club on the Breadalbane-Collector circuit
15 August 1925	W.J.Schwabe won the Three Mile Novice Solo Handicap at an average speed of 40 mph on a 1.5 hp Waratah at the Brisbane Motor Cycle Club's championship carnival in Deagon.
31 October 1925	A.L.Vowles on a 1.5 hp Waratah came second in the solo class of the Brisbane Motor Cycle Club's Eight Hours' Motor Cycle Trial.
26 January 1926	An attempt at a Lightweight Motorcycle Record was to have been made by a Mr. Jack Schwabe on a 1.5 hp Waratah.
3 May 1926	E.Turner, riding a Waratah, came third in the second heat of the Clifton Motor Cycle Club's Three Miles Open Novice Solo Handicap for all powers.
16 October 1926	Jack Schwabe raced a Waratah machine in the Third Heat of the One Mile Handicap at the Exhibition Speedway in Brisbane.
7 August 1926	Two Waratahs were entered in the Night Speedway at the Agricultural Ground. R. Sulway came third in the first heat of the Open Handicap on a 148 c.c Waratah. A 148 c.c Waratah, probably ridden by Davidson, probably came third in the fourth heat.
31 December 1926	G.Davidson came in fourth, losing four points, of the trade riders in the Under 650 c.c class of the sixth annual six-days' trials of the Motor Cycle Club of New South Wales. "The smallest of all was a Waratah ridden by G Davidson in the trade class, which is rated as only 1.5 hp (147 cc). Davidson expressed himself quite satisfied with his little machine's performance, although there is no doubt that he had a strenuous time on some parts of the course in keeping to schedule time. The officials who followed the contest in Mr S Stuart's Rolls Royce car expressed their admiration for Davidson's courage and determination, as he negotiated some very mountainous country under adverse conditions." The course was about 950 miles and of 36 entries, 19 were in the under 650 cc class.
14 May 1927	E.Trichon entered an unspecified Waratah machine in Sydney Bicycle and Motor Club's half-day reliability trial: a distance of about 60 miles over the Parramatta, Galston, Hornsby course with speeds ranging from 20 to 22 miles an hour according to engine capacity.
26 December 1927	H.Davidson was entered on a Waratah in the 1000 mile, seventh annual six-day trials of the Motor Cycle Club of New South Wales. G. Davidson (presumably the same person, just a reporting error) competed on a 147 cc Waratah, and was described as a trade rider rather than a private owner.
26 December 1928	S.Piper was one of 23 riders to start the eighth annual six days' trial of the Motor Cycle Club of New South Wales. He was on the smallest machine, a 147 cc (l.5 hp) Waratah.
November 1932	E.Warrick campaigned a 2.5 hp Waratah in the Auburn District Motor Cycle Club's events. He came 3rd in the Flying .25 Mile Championship 350 cc s.v. Class race with a time of 16.4s. He came first in the Miniature Tourist Trophy All Powers Handicap of 25 Laps. With a 50s handicap his time was 21m 26s.
6 October 1934	E.Hopper competed on a 2.25 hp Waratah at the Kedron Motor Cycle Club's flying furlong competition at Myrtletown, getting the slowest times for Best Run (10.11 secs.) and Adj. Time, and the largest H'cap. (This best time corresponds to a speed of 44.5 mph.)
20 March 1936	In flying quarter-mile speed tests held by the Queanbeyan Motor Cycle Club, A.Dunbar attained times of 19.4 and 17.2 seconds on an unspecified model of Waratah motorcycle (the faster of these being about 52 mph.)
5 December 1954	D.Evans came first in the 250 cc. Lightweight Scratch, and second in the 250 cc. Lightweight Handicap at Narrabundah circuit.

== Agents, Distributors, Etc, ==
Place	Company	Dates
Brisbane, QLD	Clyno Cycle and Motor Agency	1915, 1916
Brisbane, QLD	Morgan and Wacker	1925, 1926, 1927, 1928, 1929 (Relinquished end 1929)
Brisbane, QLD	Harris Motor Cycle Agency	1928
Brisbane, QLD	Frank Pearce	1929
Brisbane, QLD	The British Motor Cycle Company	1929, 1932, 1933, 1934, 1935, 1937, 1938, 1939
Canberra, ACT	P. W. (Bill) Parsons	1937
Canberra, ACT	Canberra Motor Sales	1951
Canberra, ACT	Canberra Motors	1952
Longreach, QLD	Central Retreading Works	1938
Rockhampton, QLD	Lawrence Motor Co.	1925, 1926
Sydney, NSW	Canada Cycle and Motor Agency Ltd.	1911
Sydney, NSW	Empson and Co.	1918, 1919
Sydney, NSW	Williams Bros., Ltd.	1915, 1916, 1917, 1918, 1919, 1920, 1921, 1922, 1923, 1924, 1925, 1926, 1929
Sydney, NSW	P. & R. Williams Pty. Ltd.	1932, 1941, 1946, 1947, 1949, 1950, 1951 (Offering spares: 1932, 1936, 1940)
Sydney, NSW	Woodward's Motor Cycles	1949, 1951
Sydney, NSW	Arthur Trudgitt	1950, 1951
Sydney, NSW	Davies Bros.	1950
Sydney, NSW	Ryde Motor Cycles	1951
Townsville, QLD	Rees & Tice Ltd.	1924
Townsville, QLD	Australian Automotive Agencies Ltd.	1926, 1927
