= BSA M33-10 =

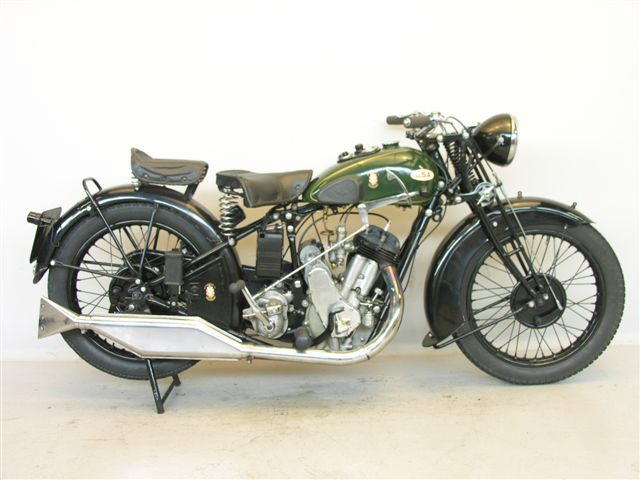
- Manufacturer: BSA
- Production: 1933
- Engine: 595cc four stroke single
- Bore / stroke: 85 mm × 105 mm (3.3 in × 4.1 in)

The BSA M33-10 was a British motorcycle made by BSA at their factory in Small Heath, Birmingham in 1933.

== Development ==
The M33-10 was developed as a 5.95 hp side valve based on the earlier BSA Sloper with capacity extended to 595cc to make it more suitable for use with a sidecar. In 1934 M33-10 was replaced by the M34-12 'de Luxe' side valve and the M34-13 overhead valve 'de Luxe' models, both of which had 5.95 hp engines.
