= Straight-twin engine =

Inline piston engine with two cylinders

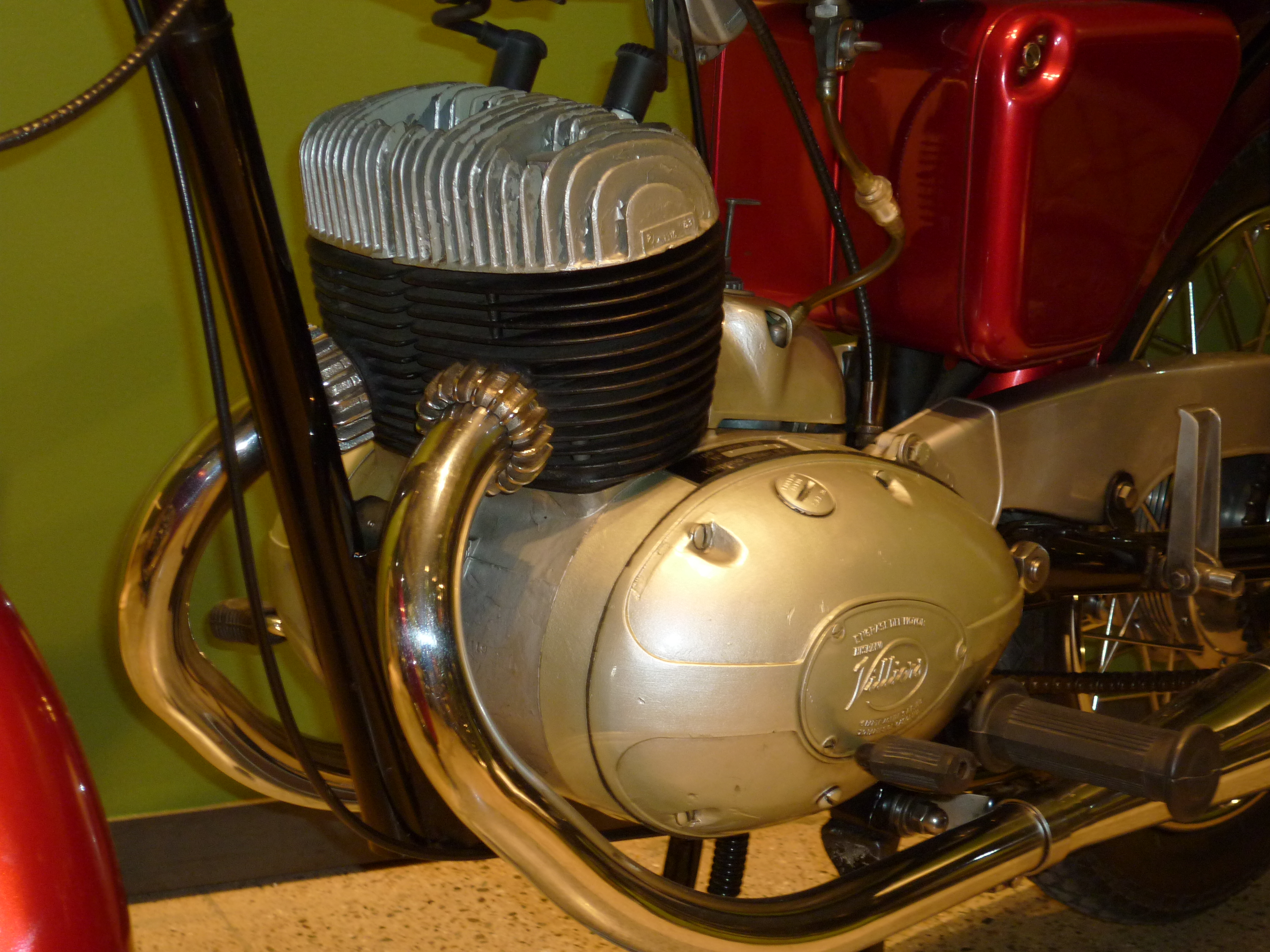
1964 Sanglas Rovena motorcycle engine (built by Hispano Villiers)

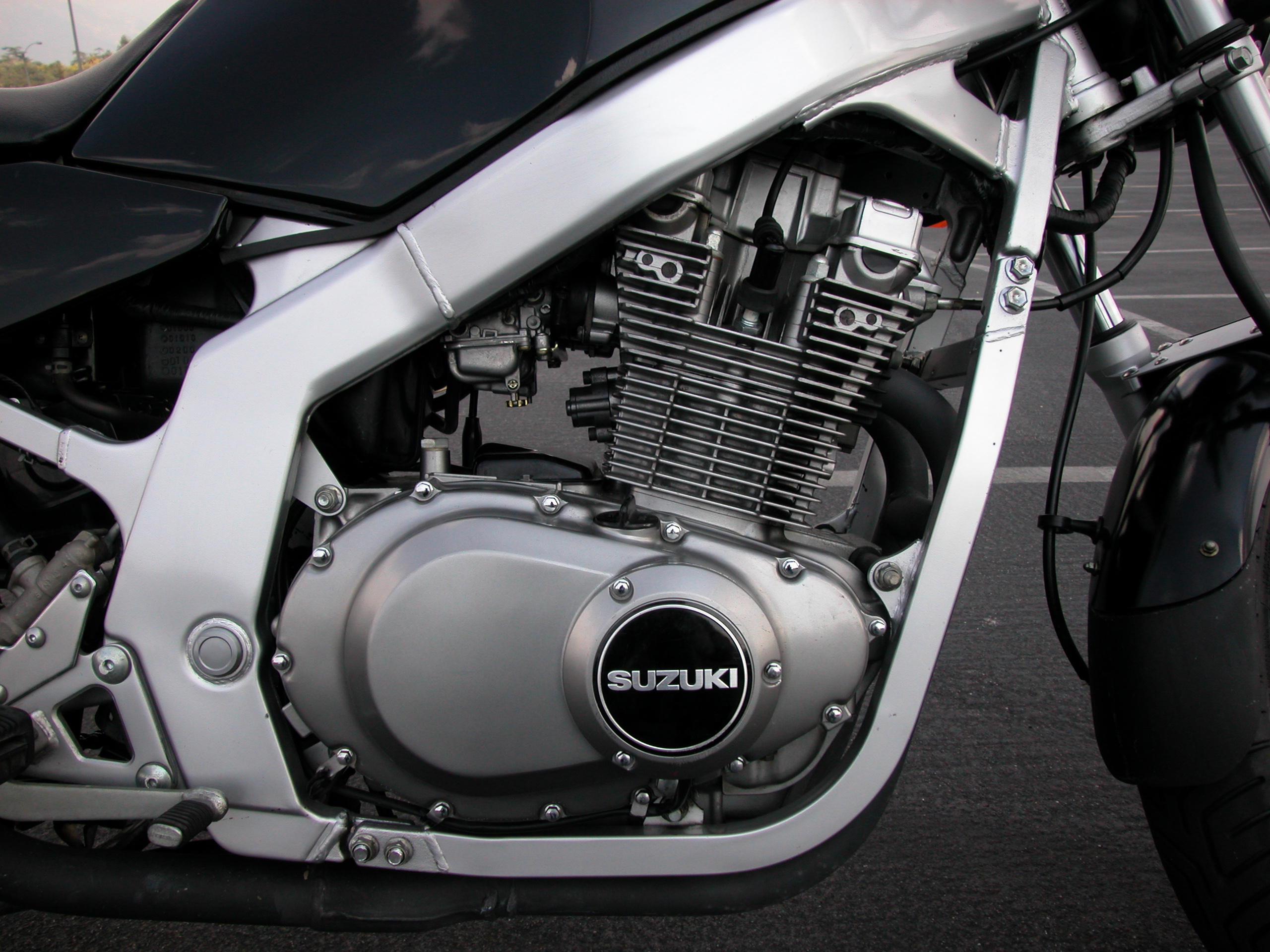
1997 Suzuki GS500 motorcycle engine

A straight-twin engine (also known as an inline-twin, vertical-twin, inline-2, or parallel-twin) is a two-cylinder piston engine whose cylinders are arranged in a line along a common crankshaft.

Straight-twin engines are primarily used in motorcycles; other uses include automobiles, marine vessels, snowmobiles, jet skis, all-terrain vehicles, tractors and ultralight aircraft.

Various different crankshaft configurations have been used for straight-twin engines, with the most common being 360 degrees, 180 degrees and 270 degrees.

== Terminology ==
The straight-twin layout is also referred to as "parallel-twin", "vertical-twin" and "inline-twin". Some of these terms originally had specific meanings relating to the crankshaft angle or engine orientation; however, they are often also used interchangeably.

In the United Kingdom, the term "parallel-twin" is traditionally used for engines with a crankshaft angle of 360 degrees, since the two pistons are in the same direction (i.e. parallel to each other). "Vertical-twin" was used to describe engines with a crankshaft angle of 180 degrees, which causes the pistons to travel in opposite directions. The terms "straight-twin" and "inline-twin" were used more generically for any crankshaft angle.

For motorcycles, "inline-twin" has sometimes referred to either a longitudinal engine orientation (i.e. with the crankshaft in line with the chassis) or a U-engine (tandem twin) where the cylinders are arranged longitudinally in the chassis (although the two crankshafts are actually oriented transversely).

== Design ==
Compared with V-twin engines and flat-twin engines, straight-twins are more compact, a simpler design and cheaper to produce. Straight-twin engines can be prone to vibration, either because of the irregular firing interval present in 180° crank engines or the large uncountered reciprocating mass in 360° crank engines. Inline-twins also suffer further from torsional torque reactions and vibration.

=== Crankshaft angle ===
Animation with different crankshaft angles

The most common crankshaft configurations for straight-twin engines are 360 degrees, 180 degrees and 270 degrees.

360 degrees

In an engine with a 360 degree crankshaft, both pistons move up and down at the same time. However, the firing interval is offset between cylinders, with one of the cylinders firing during the first crankshaft rotation and then the other cylinder in the following rotation. This set up results an even 360 degree firing interval unlike other crank configurations in inline twin engines. The 360 degree engines can use a single ignition system for both cylinders, using a wasted spark system.

The imperfect primary balance is as per a single-cylinder engine of equivalent reciprocating mass. Early engines attempted to reduce vibration through counterweights on the crankshaft; however, later methods also included balance shafts and a separate weighted connecting rod. Compared with a single-cylinder engine, the more frequent firing interval (360 degrees compared with 720 degrees) results in smoother running characteristics, despite the similar dynamic imbalance.

From the 1930s, most British four-stroke straight-twin motorcycle engines used a 360 degree crankshaft, since this avoided the uneven intake pulsing of other configurations, thus preventing the need for twin carburettors. In the 1960s, even though Japanese motorcycles mostly switched to 180 degree crankshafts for engines sized from 250 to 500 cc, various smaller and larger engines continued to use a 360 degree crankshaft. Vibration was less of an issue for smaller engines, such as the 1965 Honda CB92 and 1979 Honda CM185. Larger engines, such as the 1969 Yamaha XS 650 and 1972 Yamaha TX750, often used balance shafts to reduce the vibration. The later 1978–1984 Honda CB250N/CB400N engines also used a 360 degree crankshaft, as does the 1989 Yamaha XTZ750 Super Ténéré. The 2008 BMW F series parallel-twin motorcycles also use 360 degree crankshafts, with a third "vestigial" connecting rod (acting as a counterbalance) and a rev limit of 9,000 rpm to reduce vibrations. In 2009 Fiat launched Multiair inline twin car engines that use 360 degree crankshaft which relied on balance shafts to reduce the vibrations.

180 degrees

In an engine with a 180 degree crankshaft, one piston rises as the other falls. In a four-stroke engine, the firing interval is uneven, with the second cylinder firing 180 degrees after the first, followed by a gap of 540 degrees until the first cylinder fires again. The uneven firing interval causes vibrations and results in a 'lumpy' power delivery. A 180° engine also requires a separate ignition system for each cylinder.

Perfect primary balance is possible with a 180 degree straight-twin engine; however, the design creates a rocking couple which requires use of a balance shaft to reduce the vibration. A 180 degree straight-twin engine has a secondary imbalance (similar to an inline-four engine); however, the lower reciprocating mass means that this often does not require treatment.

A 180° crankshaft engine suffers fewer pumping losses than a 360° twin, because displacement of the crankcase is relatively unchanged as the pistons move.

In the 1960s, Japanese motorcycle manufacturers favoured the use of 180 degree crankshafts, since the increased smoothness allowed higher rpm and thus higher power outputs. For example, the 1966 Honda CB450 180 degree crankshaft engine has a similar power output to contemporary British 360 degree crankshaft engines, despite having a smaller displacement of 450 cc compared with 650 cc. Both the 1973 Yamaha TX500 and the 1977 Suzuki GS400 had a 180 degree crankshaft and a balance shaft. Since 1993, most Honda straight-twin motorcycle engines use 180 degree crankshafts.

Two-stroke engines typically use a 180 degree crankshaft, since this results in two evenly-spaced power strokes per revolution. The fundamental frequency of vibration is twice that of an equivalent single-cylinder engine; however, the amplitude is halved. Two-stroke engines that do not use a 180 degree crankshaft include the 1972 Yankee.

270 degrees

In an engine with a 270 degree crankshaft, one piston follows three quarters of a rotation behind the other. This results in an uneven firing interval where the second cylinder fires 270 degrees after the first, followed by a gap of 450 degrees until the first cylinder fires again. This is the same pattern as a 90 degree V-twin engine, and both configurations have a similar 'pulsing' exhaust sound as a result. The pistons in a 270 degree straight-twin engine are never both stationary at the same time (as per a 90 degree V-twin engine), thereby reducing the net momentum exchange between the crank and pistons during a full rotation.

An imperfect primary balance is created in a 270 degree straight-twin engine, due to a combination of free force and rocking couple; a balance shaft is often used to compensate for this. The secondary balance of a 270 degree engine is perfect; however, the configuration does result in an unbalanced rocking couple.

The first production 270 degree straight-twin motorcycle engines were fitted to the 1996 Yamaha TRX850 and Yamaha TDM. Later examples include the 2009 Triumph Thunderbird, 2010 Norton Commando 961, 2012 Honda NC700 series, 2014 Yamaha MT-07, 2016 Triumph Thruxton 1200, 2018 Royal Enfield Interceptor 650 & Continental GT and 2019 BMW F900R. This architecture is proving popular among manufacturers, which are upgrading models that were previously equipped with other engine types, such as the 2016 Honda Africa Twin (formerly a V-twin), 2023 Honda Hornet (formerly an inline-4) or 2023 V-Strom 800 (the older design being equipped with a V-twin).

285 degrees

The KTM LC8c parallel twin uses a 285° crankshaft to mimic their 75° V-twin.

=== Main bearings ===
Each cylinder in a straight-twin engine has a separate crankpin, unlike V-twin engines which can use a common crankpin for both connecting rods. Most vintage British straight-twin motorcycle engines (such as Triumph, BSA, Norton and Royal Enfield) had two main bearings. Beginning in the late 1950s, most Honda straight-twin engines had four main bearings. Subsequent straight-twin engines had four or occasionally three main bearings.

== Usage in motorcycles ==
=== History ===
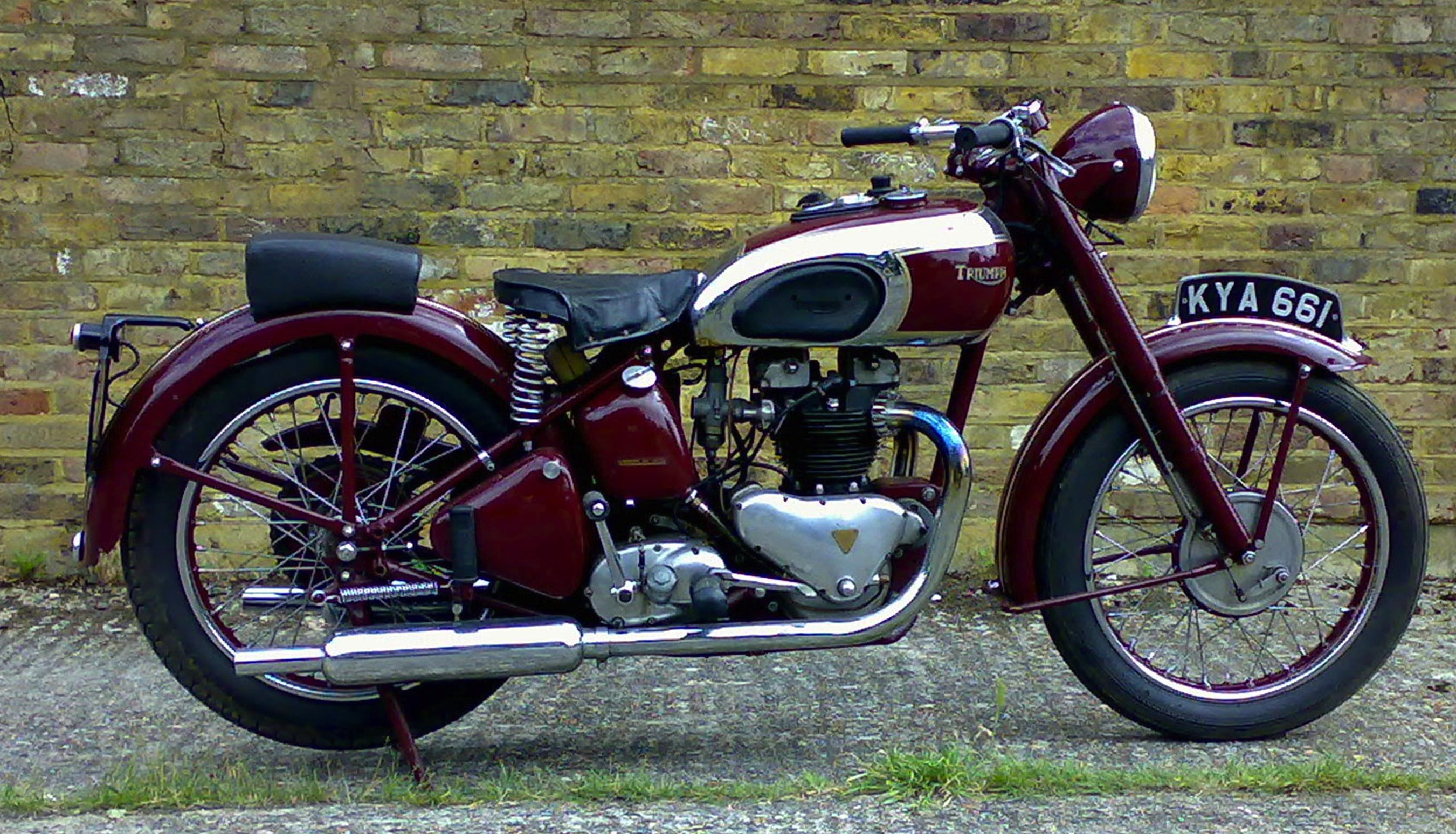
1938–1966 Triumph Speed Twin

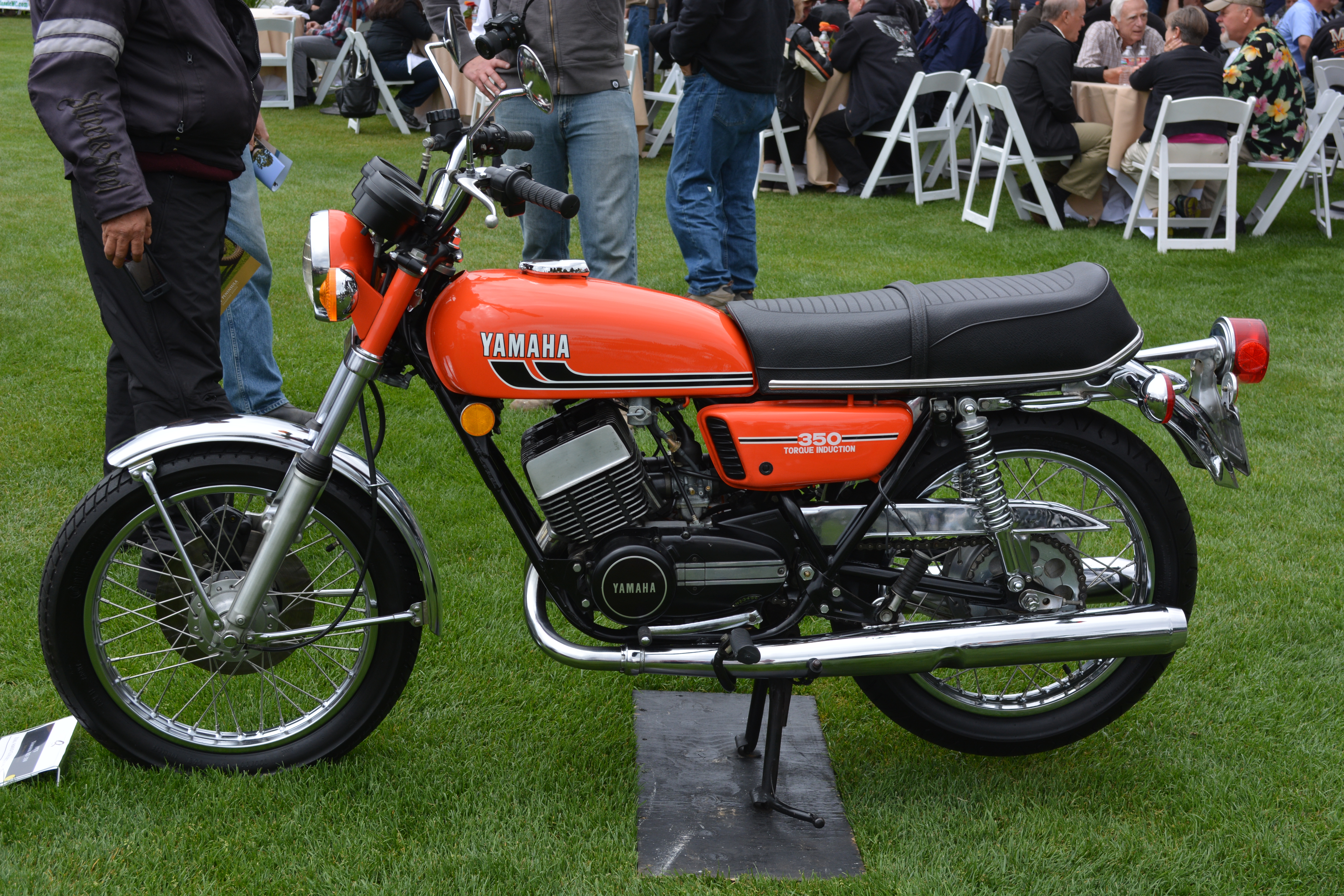
1973–1975 Yamaha RD350 two-stroke motorcycle

The world's first production motorcycle, the 1894 Hildebrand & Wolfmüller used a straight-twin engine. The cylinders lay flat and forward-facing, with the pistons connected directly to the rear wheel using a locomotive-style connecting rod. In 1903, the Werner Motocyclette became the second production motorcycle model, using a straight-twin engine with vertical cylinders. The Werner engine uses cast-iron cylinders with integral heads, side valves and has a displacement of 500 cc.

The 1938 Triumph Speed Twin was a successful straight-twin motorcycle which also led to straight-twin engines becoming more widely used by other brands. The engine was designed by Edward Turner and Val Page, and was initially used in the 1933 Triumph 6/1 sidecar hauler (which won the International Six Days Trial silver medal and the 1933 Maudes Trophy). During the development of the engine, it was found that a 360 degree crank angle was better suited to the use of a single carburettor than a 180 degree crank angle.

Following the trend created by the Triumph Speed Twin, the most common design used by British motorcycle manufacturers until the mid-1970s was a four-stroke straight-twin engine with a 360 degree crankshaft. The manufacturers producing these motorcycles included BSA, Norton, Triumph, Ariel, Matchless and AJS. Straight-twin engines were also produced by Italian and German manufacturers, along with the American manufacturer Indian.

In 1949, the AJS E-90 Porcupine won the 500 1949 Grand Prix World Championship, becoming the first and only straight-twin motorcycle to win the championship. This engine is one of few four-stroke straight-twins to use cylinders oriented horizontally rather than vertically.

Since the 2000s, BMW and several Japanese manufacturers have continued to produce straight-twin engines, mostly for middleweight models. Several large scooters have also used straight-twin engines, such as the 2001 Yamaha TMAX and the 2001 Honda Silver Wing. Straight-twin engines are also used in motocross sidecar racing.

=== Transverse-engined models ===
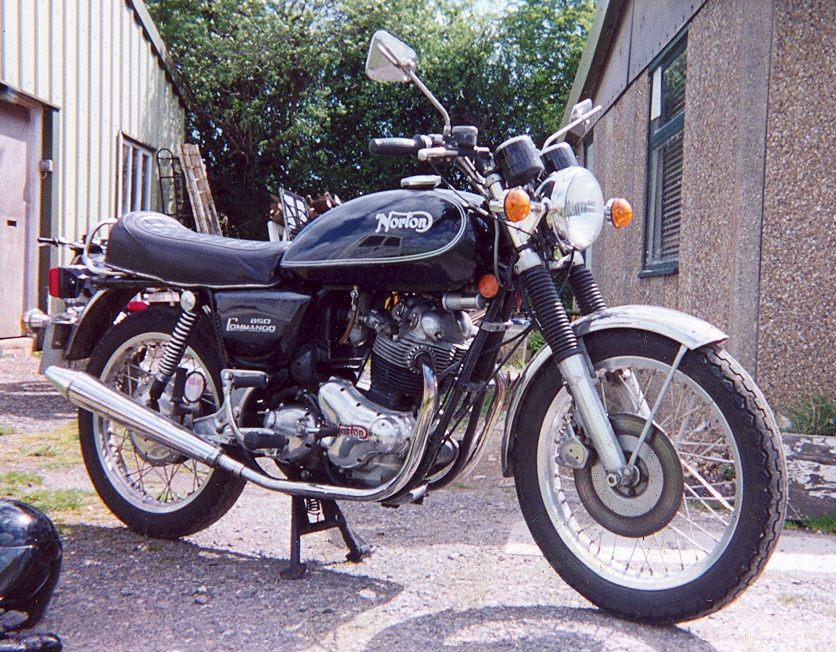
1974 Norton Commando Interstate

Many large British motorcycles from 1945 to the 1960s used a straight-twin transverse engine (i.e. oriented with the crankshaft perpendicular to the frame), such as the Triumph Bonneville and Norton Commando. This layout is well suited to air-cooling, since both cylinders receive equal airflow and the exhaust can exit in the well-cooled location at the front of each cylinder.

The transverse-engine straight-twin design has been largely replaced by V-twin engines; however, the straight-twin design has the advantage of easier packaging of ancillaries (such as the air-filter, carburettor and ignition components), which also improves access to ancillaries for maintenance/repairs. A straight-twin engine using a 270 degree crankshaft can have a similar sound and feel to a V-twin engine with an uneven firing order.

=== Longitudinal-engined models ===
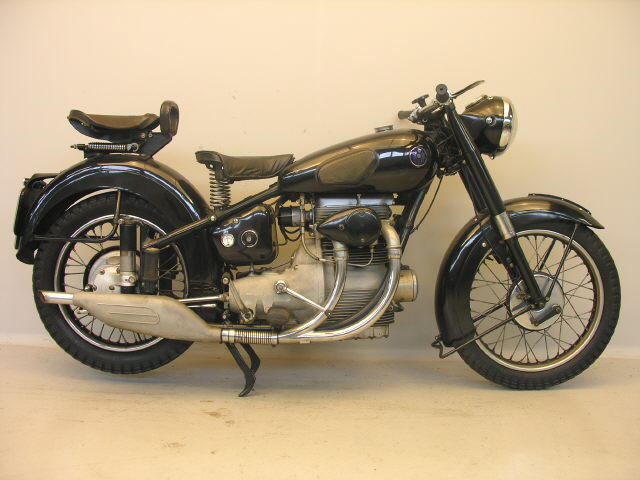
1951 Sunbeam S8

Longitudinal engine straight-twin motorcycles are less common; however, examples include the 1930–1938 Dresch Monobloc and the 1949–1956 Sunbeam S7 and S8.

This engine orientation allows for a motorcycle as narrow as a single-cylinder engine, which reduces the aerodynamic drag, especially for the purpose of motorcycle racing. However, the main disadvantage for air-cooled engines is that the rear cylinder runs hotter than the front cylinder.

== Usage in automobiles ==
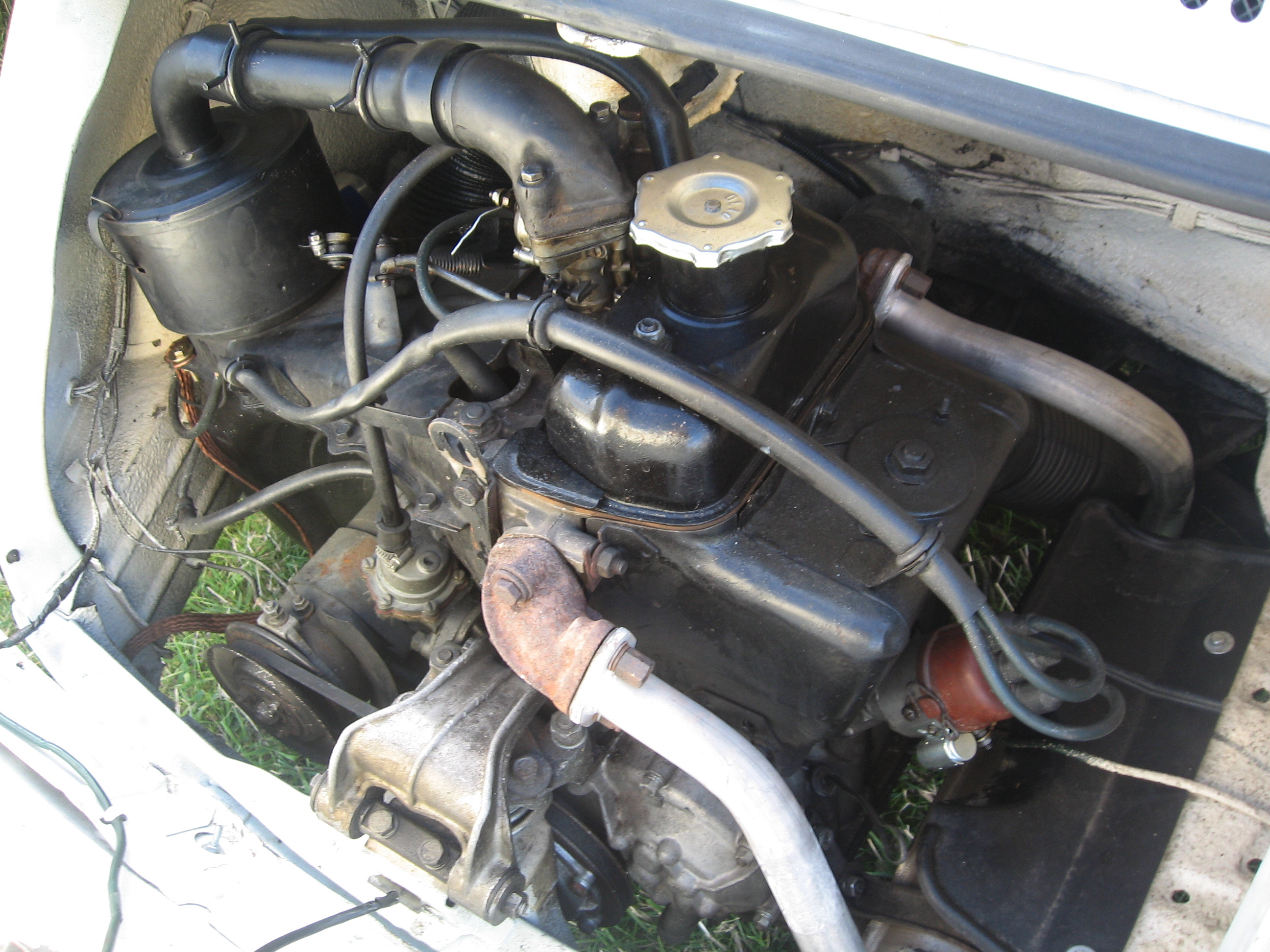
Longitudinal straight-twin engine at the rear of a Fiat 500

Although two-cylinder engines are quite uncommon in cars, the straight-twin layout has been used for several automobile engines over time.

The first known straight-twin engine was a variant of the Daimler Motors' Phoenix engine introduced in 1895; these engines were used in Panhard cars that year. Another early straight-twin engined car was the 1898 Decauville Voiturelle, which used a pair of cylinders taken from a de Dion model mounted fore and aft and positioned below the seat.

Straight-twin engines have been used in various small cars, such as the 1957 Fiat 500, 1958 Subaru 360, 1958 NSU Prinz, 1962 Mitsubishi Minica, 1967 Honda N360, 1970 Honda Z600, 1972 Fiat 126, 1988 VAZ Oka, 1988 Dacia Lăstun, 1980 Daihatsu Cuore, and the 2008 Tata Nano.

As of January 2024, petrol straight-twin engines used in production cars currently just include the Fiat TwinAir engine (used in various models from Fiat, Lancia and Alfa Romeo).

The Piaggio Porter made use of a diesel straight-twin engine until 2020.

== Usage in marine vessels ==
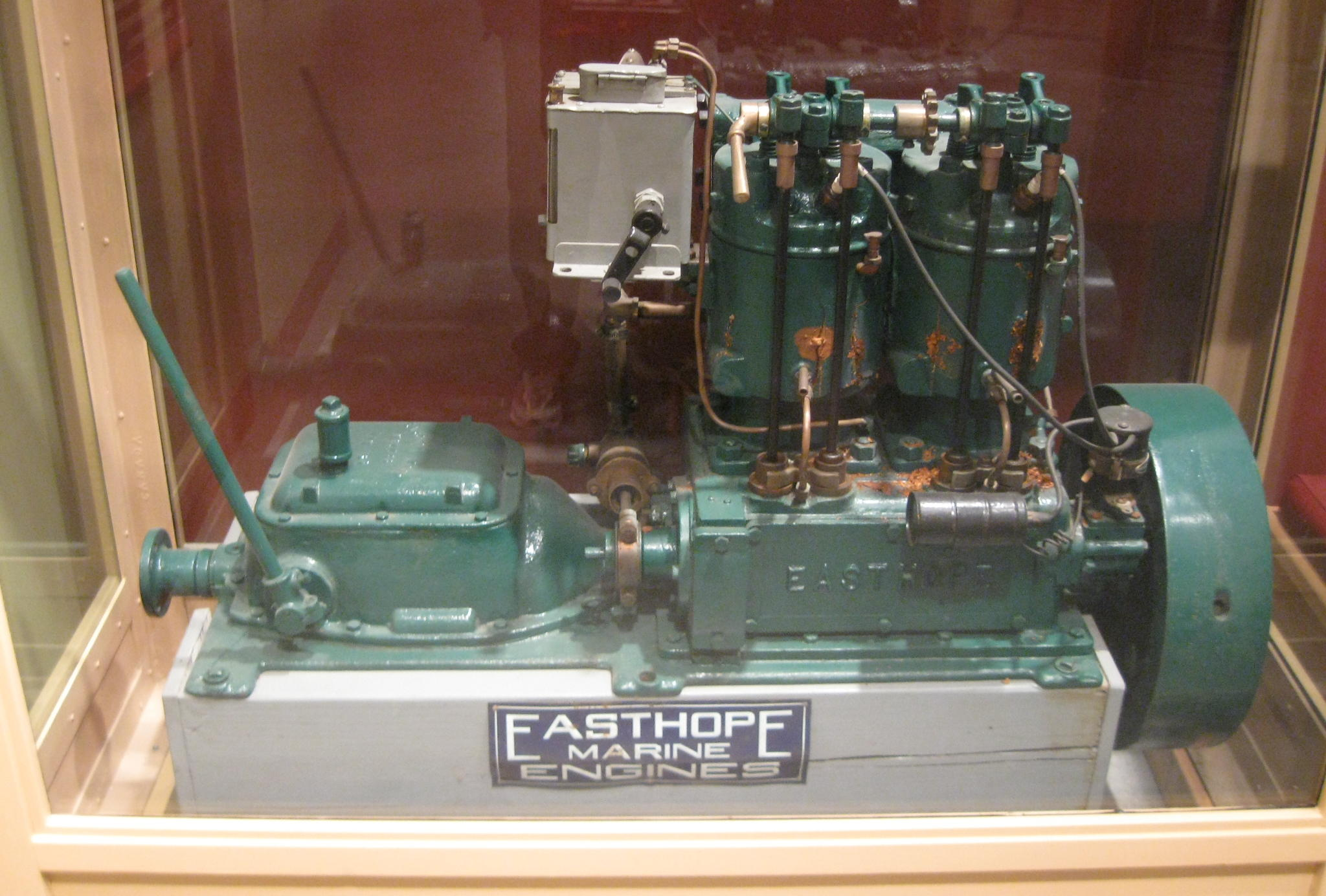
Easthope marine engine, circa 1960

Straight-twin engines have been often used as inboard motors, outboard motors and jet pump motors.

In the early 20th century, gaff-rigged British fishing boats such as Morecambe Bay PrawnersLancashire Nobbys would sometimes retrofit an inboard engine, such as the Lister or the Kelvin E2 3.0 litre petrol–paraffin engine.

From the 1950s, manufacturers of outboard motors had settled on the use of the basic inline engine design, cylinders stacked on top of each other with the crankshaft driving the propeller shaft. The Suzuki 15 outbound motor was introduced in 1989.

== Other uses ==
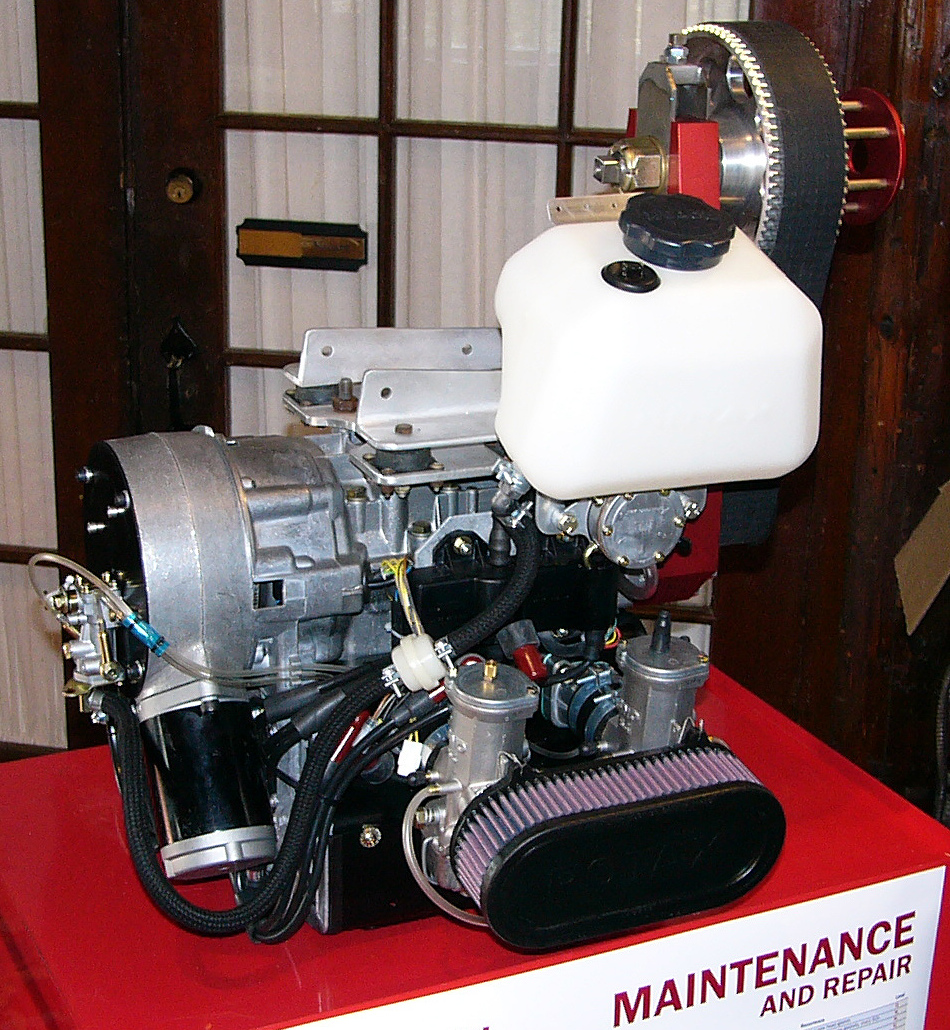
Rotax 503 aircraft engine

Other uses include tractors (such as various John Deere models until 1960), snowmobiles, personal watercraft, and all-terrain vehicles. Design variations include two-stroke, four-stroke, petrol, diesel, air-cooling, water-cooling, natural aspiration and turbocharging.

Ultralight aircraft, single seat gyro-copters and small homebuilt aircraft have also used straight-twin engines, often using engines originally designed for snowmobiles such as the Hirth 2704 and Cuyuna 430-D. Purpose-built engines for ultralight aircraft include the Rotax 503 and Rotax 582. Straight-twin engines are sometimes also used in large scale radio-controlled aircraft.

== See also ==
- Flat-twin engine
- List of motorcycles by type of engine
- V-twin engine
- Split-single engine
