= Yamaha TX750 =

Two-cylinder standard motorcycle built by Yamaha

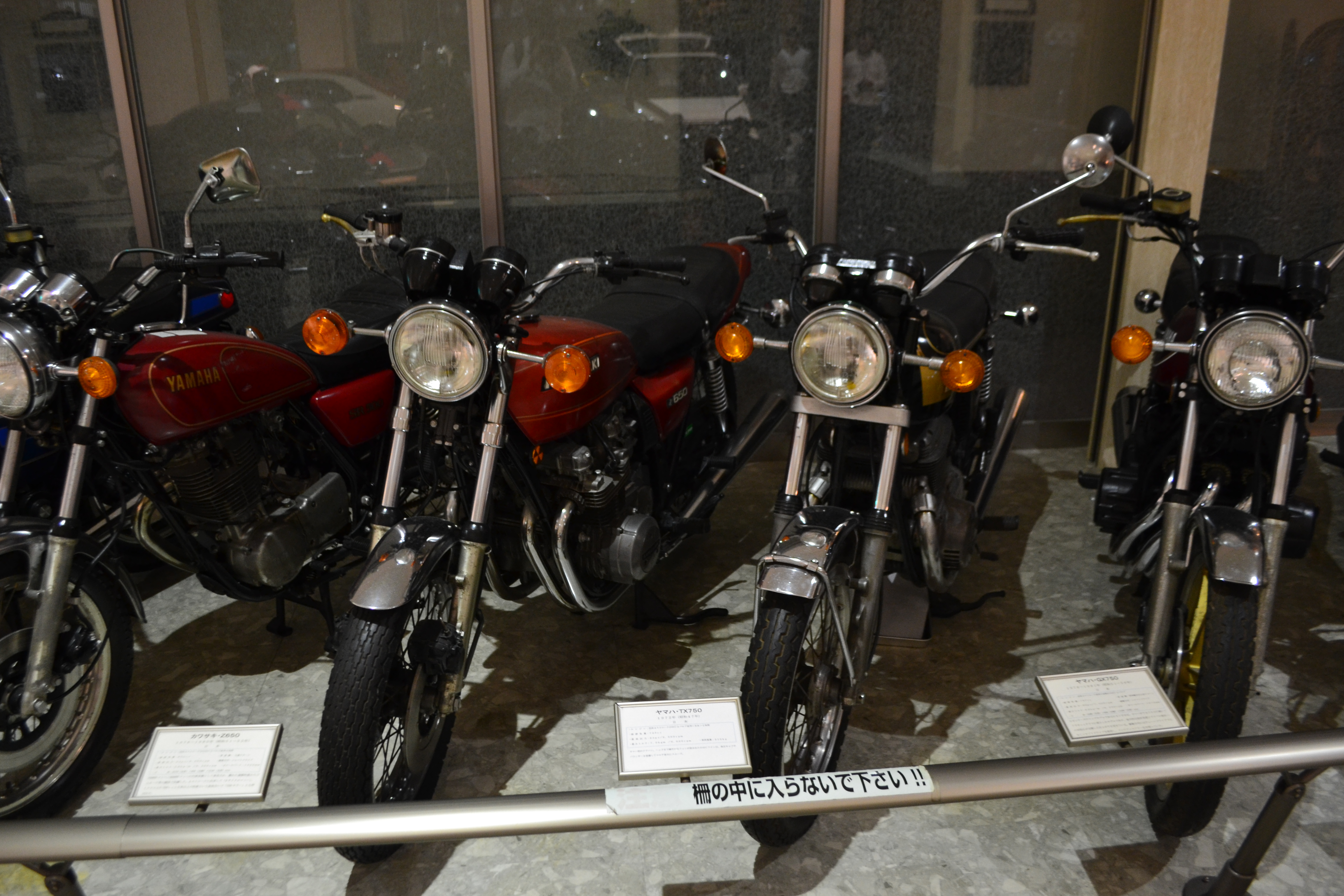
- 1973 Yamaha TX750
- Manufacturer: Yamaha Motor Company
- Production: 1972-1975
- Predecessor: XS650
- Class: standard
- Engine: 743 cc (45.3 cu in) SOHC parallel twin
- Bore / stroke: 80 mm x 74 mm
- Compression ratio: 8.8:1
- Top speed: 153 kilometres per hour (95 mph)
- Power: 63 hp (47 kW) @ 7,500 rpm
- Torque: 50.6 lb⋅ft (7.0 kg⋅m) @ 6000 rpm
- Transmission: Five-speed sequential manual
- Brakes: Front: single or dual 300 mm (11.8 in) discs Rear: 180 mm (7.1 in) drum
- Tires: 3.50-19-4 PR Front; 4.00-18-4 PR Rear
- Rake, trail: 27°/99 mm (3.9 in)
- Wheelbase: 1,455 mm (57 in)
- Dimensions: L: 2,205 mm (87 in); W: 910 mm (36 in); H: 1,165 mm (46 in)
- Seat height: 810 mm (32 in)
- Weight: 235 kilograms (518 lb) (wet)
- Fuel capacity: 3.7 US gal (14.0 L; 3.1 imp gal)
- Oil capacity: 3.2 US qt (3.0 L)
- Fuel consumption: 34.4 US gal (130.2 L; 28.6 imp gal)
- Turning radius: 2,400 mm (94 in)
- Related: Yamaha TX500

The TX750 is a two-cylinder standard motorcycle built by Yamaha. The bike was released in 1972. Significant reliability problems affected the engines in early bikes. Yamaha made several changes to solve the problems but the bike was withdrawn from most markets after 1974 and production stopped in the home market after 1975.

== Chassis and suspension ==
The TX750 had a double-cradle frame of tubular steel.

Front suspension was a hydraulically damped telescopic fork with 5.9 in (150 mm) of travel and coil springs with a rate of 2.98 lb⋅ft (4.0 N⋅m). There were no gaiters on the 1.4 in (36 mm) standpipes. A vane-type steering damper was fitted.

At the rear was a steel swing-arm that rode in plain bearings. Springing and damping were provided by dual shock absorbers and progressively wound coil springs whose rate varied from 9.83–11.5 lb⋅ft (13.3–15.6 N⋅m) and provided 3 in (76 mm) of travel. The rear-shocks were five-way adjustable units.

The TX750 was the first Yamaha road bike to have aluminum wheel rims. The rims were copies of Akront valanced rims made by DID.

In Europe the TX750 had dual front disc brakes with dual expanding pistons on 11.8 in (300 mm) discs. In Japan, the United States, and other markets the bike had a single disc, although the lugs needed to mount a second disc were in place. On all bikes the rear brake was a 7.1 in (180 mm) drum with an internally expanding single leading shoe.

The front wheel mounted a 3.50 - 19 - 4PR tire while a 4.00 - 18 - 4PR tire was on the rear.

The bodywork was finished with a metal-flake paint.

== Engine and drivetrain ==
Unlike Yamaha's earlier vertical XS650, the TX750's engine was a forward inclined air-cooled parallel twin with a 360° crankshaft, a chain-driven single overhead cam, and two valves per cylinder. The engine was aluminum with a horizontally split crankcase and steel liners in the cylinder bores. The intake system was fed by two 38 mm Mikuni Solex carburetors.

New features in this engine included a positive crankcase ventilation system, hardened valve seats suitable for unleaded fuel and a balance tube in a cast manifold that connected the two exhaust ports together on the front of the engine. The balance of the 2-into-2 exhaust system were dual up-swept pipes with megaphone ends.

The engine used automotive-style plain bearings for the major rotating components. Three bearings were used for the crankshaft and two for the camshaft. The choice of bearings necessitated the use of a high-pressure lubrication system, which in the TX750 was a dry-sump system with two Eaton-type trochoidal pumps; one for pressure and one for scavenge.

Yamaha claimed 63 hp (47.0 kW) @ 7500 rpm and 50.6 lb⋅ft (7.0 kg⋅m) @ 6000 rpm. The engine had a more restrictive exhaust in the German market, which lowered output power to 51 hp (38.0 kW) and torque to 42.6 lb⋅ft (57.8 N⋅m). Some reviews of the bike report other differences, such as 8.4:1 compression ratios and 32 mm carburetors, but it is not clear whether these were changes for specific markets or running production changes.

Yamaha designed the engine with a unique oil-filter located in an unusual location. Replacement filters are difficult to find, and adapters that allow the use of more commonly available filters have appeared in the aftermarket.

To counteract the vibration that occurs naturally in a parallel twin, Yamaha introduced a system they called the "Omni-Phase balancer". The Omni-Phase system used one chain-driven weighted shaft in the engine sump rotating in the direction opposite that of the crankshaft to counteract forces created by the pistons moving up and down the inclined axis of the piston bores. A second shaft with weights rotating in the same direction as the crankshaft counteracted the force couple created by the difference in the vertical height of the fore-and-aft forces created by the crankshaft and the first balance shaft. The Omni-Phase balance system consumed some engine power to operate.

In early production models sold in Japan, Yamaha used a spring-loaded chain-tensioner to control lash on the chain driving the Omni-Phase balancer, but this was later changed to drive sprockets with a 1 mm offset which controlled chain lash while offering longer chain life and reduced noise.

Both kick-start and electric-start were standard. The electric start added a third chain to the engine's internals. The engine did not have a decompressor. The five-speed fully meshed sequential transmission came from the earlier XS650. The sprocket sizes were 17 front, 40 rear, connected by a #530 chain.

== Other features ==
The TX750 instrument package included four lamps that warned of various problems. The upper lamp would light whenever the main headlamp was burnt out, while also sending power to a secondary filament. Below this was a lamp that came on when the thickness of the rear brake shoe fell below a specific amount. To the left of that lamp was an oil pressure warning light, and on the right a lamp that would glow solid red whenever the brakes were applied, and would blink red if the rear lamp was burnt out.

== History ==
Until the early 1970s Yamaha focused on two-stroke bikes, but concerns about pollution had begun to make two-strokes increasingly unpopular. Around this same time competitors started to release new four-stroke multi-cylinder bikes with larger engines and greater levels of comfort. Yamaha added four-stroke engines to their line-up when they released the XS650 XS1 in 1970. This bike was powered by a Hosk-derived four-stroke air-cooled twin of 654 cc.

Work began on a successor to the XS650 two years before its 1972 debut. Although superficially similar to the XS650, the TX750 was an almost entirely new design. The TX750 was featured in an article in Yamaha News magazine in October 1972, and appeared on Yamaha's stand at the 19th Tokyo Motor Show one month later.

The standard road bike was model number 341, while the police version was model number 435. The police version came with a distinctive valve-cover.

The bike was released in Japan in July 1972, and towards the end of the same year in the United States, where it retailed for a price of US$1554.00.

Shortly after being launched in Europe reports of engine failures began to come in. Several causes for the failures were suggested. One suggested cause for the failures was the oddly shaped and located oil filter. Others blamed the bike's complicated oil system for starving parts of lubrication. Others blamed the quality of the oil available at the time.

One of the two most commonly suspected causes was excessive heat coming from the balance tube connecting the exhaust ports. The other most common claim was that the Omni-Phase balancer's weighted shafts were whipping oil in the sump into a froth at high rpms, aerating the oil and starving the crank of lubrication which then resulted in bearing failure. Yamaha described the cause as "a problem with heat build-up that prevented stable engine performance and insufficient machine durability".

One ready solution was to add an external oil cooler. Coolers from a variety of sources were retrofitted to the bikes, often mounted high and out of sight. Eventually Yamaha came out with a cooler of their own, mounted low in the air-stream. Yamaha recalled the bikes, a first for the industry, and sent techs out to dealerships to install the oil coolers.

Problems specific to the balance system also occurred. The chain driving the counterbalance shafts would stretch, resulting in the counterweights being out of phase with the crankshaft and the engine vibrating more severely than a regular twin would. The tight timing tolerances between the two balance shafts caused some reviewers to worry that a slight maladjustment would cause the eccentric weights on the shafts to run into each other. Yamaha's fix in this case was to revert to an external chain adjuster, which required a modified sump.

In all 18 engineering change orders, including a deeper sump, were issued for the engine. The extensively modified 1974 TX750A model does not suffer from reliability issues.

Despite Yamaha's efforts to solve the problems, sales of the TX750 never recovered.

== Production figures ==
| Model year | Months | VINs | Units |
|---|---|---|---|
| 1972 | August - December | 341-000001 - 015511 | 15511 |
| 1973 | January - March | 341-015512 - 023281 | 7770 |
| 1973 | April - December | 341-100101 - 103460 | 3360 |
| 1974 | January - December | 341-103461 - 104360 | 900 |
| 1975 | January - December | 341-104361 - 104760 | 400 |
| All years (Europe) | | 341-50XXXX | ~5500 |
| All years (Police) | | 435-XXXXXX | |
| Total | | | ~33441 |

== Reviews and road tests ==
In general reviewers praised the effectiveness of the Omni-Phase balancer system. A June 1973 review by Big Bike magazine said that at low rpms the TX750 vibrated as much as a typical British twin, but that at higher engine speeds the bike became smoother. Popular Science reviewer Ray Hill called the TX750 "one of the smoothest-riding bikes I've ever been aboard." Cycle World magazine wrote in their October 1972 issue: "The result is smoothness beyond belief," and "Shut your eyes and you are on a four. It couldn’t be a twin." Cycle magazine's issue of March 1973 called the TX750's engine the "Most advanced two-cylinder engine in motorcycling"

The controls and instruments were described as top quality and easy to use. The three warning light system drew mixed reviews, with some expressing appreciation for the extra redundancy built into the lighting system and others voicing annoyance at the way the warning system operated, lighting a red lamp under normal conditions and flashing in the event of a problem.

The bike was characterized as a low-rpm tourer rather than a high-revving sports-bike. The bike's throttle-response and low-end torque were ranked high. In a March 1973 article Cycle magazine called the TX750 "one of the ten fastest production motorcycles in the world" based on its quarter-mile speed. Testers reported noticeable driveline lash, and clunking and lurching when shifting out of neutral. Other complaints focused on a lack of preload in the front suspension, and excessive softness in the suspension and seat pad in general. Handling was described as adequate, with some reviews describing the bike as stable on the straights and in corners, and others reporting a tendency to squirm or wobble when pushed into faster corners.

Some reviews recorded high oil temperatures even in testing and recommended prospective owners consider adding an external oil cooler.

== Motorsports ==
In September 1972 one of the first TX750s exported to Australia was prepared to challenge the One Hour, Twelve Hour and Twenty-four Hour Australian endurance records. A combination of mechanical problems and confusion over the existing records caused the attempt to be stopped after six hours. The team claimed the previously unrecorded Six Hour record after having covered 370.23 mi (595.8 km) at an average speed of 61.68 mph (99.3 km/h).

The same TX750 was part of a team that appeared at the 1972 Castrol Six Hour race at Amaroo Park. Yamaha put together a six-bike, twelve-rider team for the event. After a series of both major and minor mechanical failures and some rider errors only three of the six were running at the end of the race. The highest placed TX750 finished in fifth place.

One of the first TX750s to arrive in Europe was ridden to a sixth-place finish by "Texas" Henk Klassen at the 6 Hour event held at the Zandvoort circuit in the summer of 1973.

Yamaha Motor Amsterdam contracted Porsche A.G. Research to prepare the TX750 to be entered in endurance racing events in 1974. Two bikes were run in the Bol d'Or 24 at Le Mans. The Porsche-prepared engines were replaced with Yamaha engines but both bikes failed during the night with snapped cam chains. The bikes also ran at the Thruxton 500 Miles in England. Both TX750 Endurance racers are reported to have been destroyed after their racing careers were over.

== Bibliography ==
- Vandenheuvel, Cornelis (June 1997). Pictorial History of Japanese Motorcycles. Motorbooks International. ISBN 978-0760304105.
- Walker, Mick (1 November 1993). Yamaha. Osprey Publishing Company. ISBN 978-1855323421.
