= Erling Poppe =

Austrian-born English car and motorcycle designer

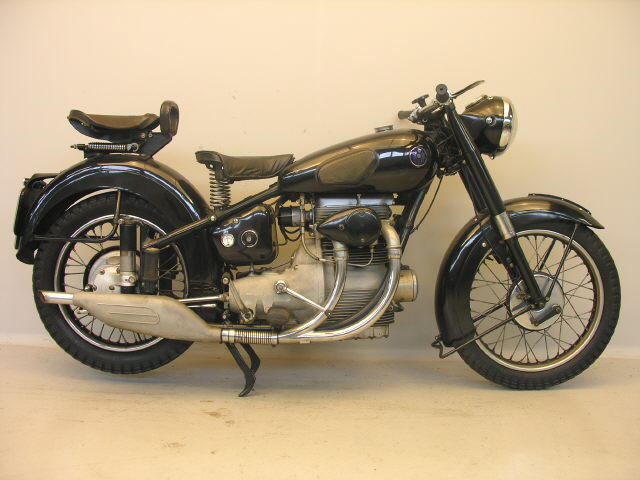
1951 Sunbeam S8

Erling Poppe (12 November 1898 – 1970) was an Austrian-born English-raised motor vehicle designer who studied engineering in Birmingham, England, and designed Packman & Poppe Motorcycles, Sunbeam motorcycles and Gordon three-wheeler cars.

== Early life ==
Poppe was born in Steyr, Austria, 12 November 1898, the son of Norwegian Peter August Poppe and Frederikke Emilie Poppe, while his father had been on loan to Steyr Mannlicher. The whole family were settled in Coventry by February 1901 when their next child was born.

== Motor cycles ==
At Packman & Poppe Motorcycles in 1922 Erling Poppe was responsible for their first motorcycle which featured a 250 cc two-stroke engine, a 976 cc side-valve machine with a JAP V-twin engine in 1923 and the Silent Three using a 350 cc Barr and Stroud sleeve-valve engine.

Poppe designed the Sunbeam S7 and S8 motorcycles based on the BMW R75 designs that were acquired by BSA (together with the full rights to the Sunbeam brand) at the end of World War II. Built in Redditch, the engine layout was an unusual in-line 500 cc twin with a shaft drive to the rear wheel.

== Motorcars ==
At Gordon, Poppe designed a three-wheeled two-seater with a single front wheel. The single-cylinder, 197 cc, Villiers engine was mounted next to the driver (RHD), outside of the body with an external chain-drive to one rear wheel. Access to the interior was via a single door. The steel body had a folding fabric roof, and at £300 it was the cheapest car on the UK market.
