= Yamaha TX500 =

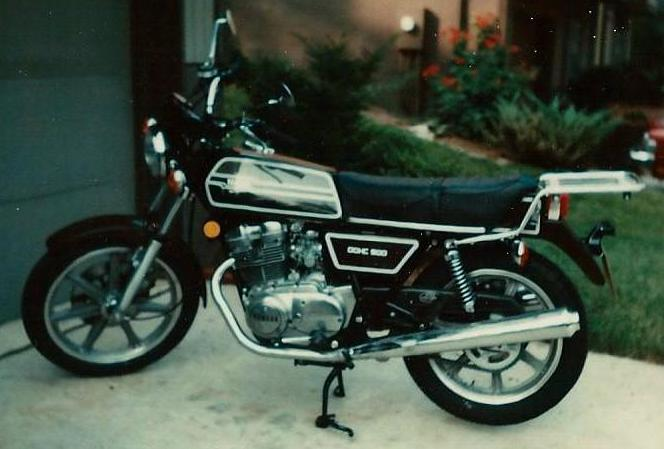
- 1976 Yamaha XS500
- Manufacturer: Yamaha
- Also called: Yamaha XS500
- Class: Standard
- Engine: 498 cc (30.4 cu in) DOHC parallel twin
- Bore / stroke: 72.9 mm x 59.6 mm
- Compression ratio: 9.0:1
- Top speed: 180 km/h (110 mph)
- Power: 36 kW (48 bhp) @ 8,500 rpm
- Torque: 32.6 ft⋅lb (44.2 N⋅m) @ 6,500 rpm
- Ignition type: battery and coil
- Transmission: 5-speed fully meshed
- Frame type: Double-downtube full-cradle steel
- Brakes: 1x270 mm (10.5 in) disk Front; 179 mm (7.06 in) drum Rear
- Tires: 3.25-19-4PR Front; 3.50-18-4PR Rear
- Rake, trail: 26.5°/120 mm (4.6 in)
- Wheelbase: 1,400 mm (55.1 in)
- Dimensions: L: 2,150 mm (84.6 in); W: 840 mm (32.9 in); H: 1,130 mm (44.5 in)
- Weight: 185 kg (408 lb) (dry)
- Fuel capacity: 13 L; 2.8 imp gal (3.4 US gal)
- Fuel consumption: 6.7–5.9 L/100 km; 42–48 mpg_{‑imp} (35–40 mpg_{‑US}) (Highway)
- Related: Yamaha TX750

The Yamaha TX500 is a two-cylinder standard motorcycle built by Yamaha and sold in 1973 and 1974. In styling, the boxy cylinders and heads resembled the RD350, rather than the XS650, which resembled the British 650 twins. In 1975 the bike was renamed XS500 and then continued to be updated until 1978 when sales ended in the USA. In Europe, the model was available through 1980.

== History ==
The TX500 debuted in Tokyo in October 1972. It arrived in most markets in 1973, along with the larger TX750. Like Yamaha's earlier XS650, both the TX500 and TX750 were four-stroke air-cooled twins. While the TX500 and TX750 were released at or near the same time, there were significant differences between their engines. The short production life of the TX500 was due in part to problems with engine leaks and failures. The TX750 experienced similar problems, which were in part attributed to aeration of the engine oil caused by the operation of the anti-vibration system. Yamaha attributed the problem to excessive heat build-up in the engine and a lack of machine durability. In the TX500 excessive heat build-up promoted warped valve seats and cracked cylinder heads. Its exhaust ports were re-shaped on later engines to improve heat dissipation.

1973

- TX500 is introduced. Model code is 371.
- Fuel tank is rounded.
- Side covers have imitation air intakes.
- Brakes are single front disk, rear drum.

1974

- Designation changed to TX500A.
- Rear brake wear sender added.

1975

- Bike is renamed XS500; full name is XS500B. Model code remains 371.
- Carburetors receive new jets and plunger-style enrichers.
- Balance tube added to intake manifold.
- Enlarged balance pipe installed between exhausts.
- Fork spring preload reduced.

1976

- Model designation is now XS500C. Model code changes to 1J3.
- New, more rectangular tank and new side panels.
- New seat cowling with integrated mudguard.
- Front fender is mounted without stays. Fender is now body colored.
- New 38 mm Mikuni carburetors.
- Cylinder and camboxes are now a single casting.
- Compression ratio drops from 9.0:1 to 8.5:1
- Drive cogs change from 17/43 to 16/42.
- Front fork is now from Showa.
- Alloy wheels replace spoked wheels.
- Disk brake replaces rear drum.
- Front caliper now mounted behind fork.

1977

- Model designation changes to XS500D.
- Compression ratio is raised from 8.5:1 to 9.6:1

1978

- Model designation changes to XS500E.
- Last year of sales in the USA.

== Engine and drivetrain ==
The TX500 was powered by a transverse air-cooled parallel twin engine which had a 180° crankshaft. In contrast to the dry-sumped TX750, the TX500 had a wet sump. The valvetrain used double overhead camshafts (DOHC) and four valves per cylinder, which were operated by rocker arms for each pair of valves. Yamaha claimed this was the world's first mass-produced four-valve motorcycle engine. The TX500 was also claimed to be the first motorcycle to use an integrated circuit-based voltage regulator. The air/fuel mixture was delivered by two 32 mm Keihin constant-velocity (CV) carburetors in early models and by 38 mm Mikunis beginning in 1976.

The TX500 and TX750 twins both featured a vibration control technology that Yamaha called an "Omni-phase balancer". In the TX750 two chain-driven shafts with bobweights counteracted vibrations generated in the engine, while the balancer in the TX500 was a simpler version with just a single balance shaft. The chain driving the balance shaft was hidden behind the alternator, making manual adjustment difficult.

The transmission was a 5-speed fully meshed unit that drove the rear wheel through a #530 chain and a 17/43 sprocket set. The drive cogs were later changed to 16/42. The bike came with both kick and electric start.

== Chassis and suspension ==
The frame was a steel double-downtube cradle. The front suspension was a telescopic fork from Kayaba until 1976, when it became a Showa part. Rear suspension was by dual shock-absorbers and swing arm with adjustable pre-load. On early bikes the front brake was a single 270 mm (10.5 in) disk, while in back was a 179 mm (7.06 in) drum. In 1976 the front disk was increased in size to 298 mm (11.7 in), and the rear drum was converted to a single 267 mm (10.5 in) disk. 1976 was also the year that alloy wheels were substituted for the traditional wire spokes previously mounted. The front tire size was 3.25-19-4PR and the rear was 3.50-18-4PR. Rear tire size rose to 4.00H-18-4PR on later bikes.

== Reviews and riding impressions ==
Early reviews of the TX500 complimented the bike's handling, crediting the Omni-phase system with smoothing out the engine's inherent vibration. The brakes were also highly rated. A problem with sticking carburetor slides was experienced. Other reviewers found that power came on strongly and suddenly, especially in lower gears. There was also strong engine braking when the throttle was backed off. The transmission got high marks in other tests, but the carburetors were criticized. Other testers found fault with the push-pull throttle cable arrangement, and commented on slack in the drivetrain causing some jerkiness. The bike was described as being heavy for its displacement but not feeling the weight on the road. Some wheel skip was induced on a high-speed decreasing-radius downhill turn. Reviews of the revised XS500 indicated that the touchy throttle, carburetor issues and transmission lash of the TX500 had been addressed.
