= Gordon (1954–1958) =

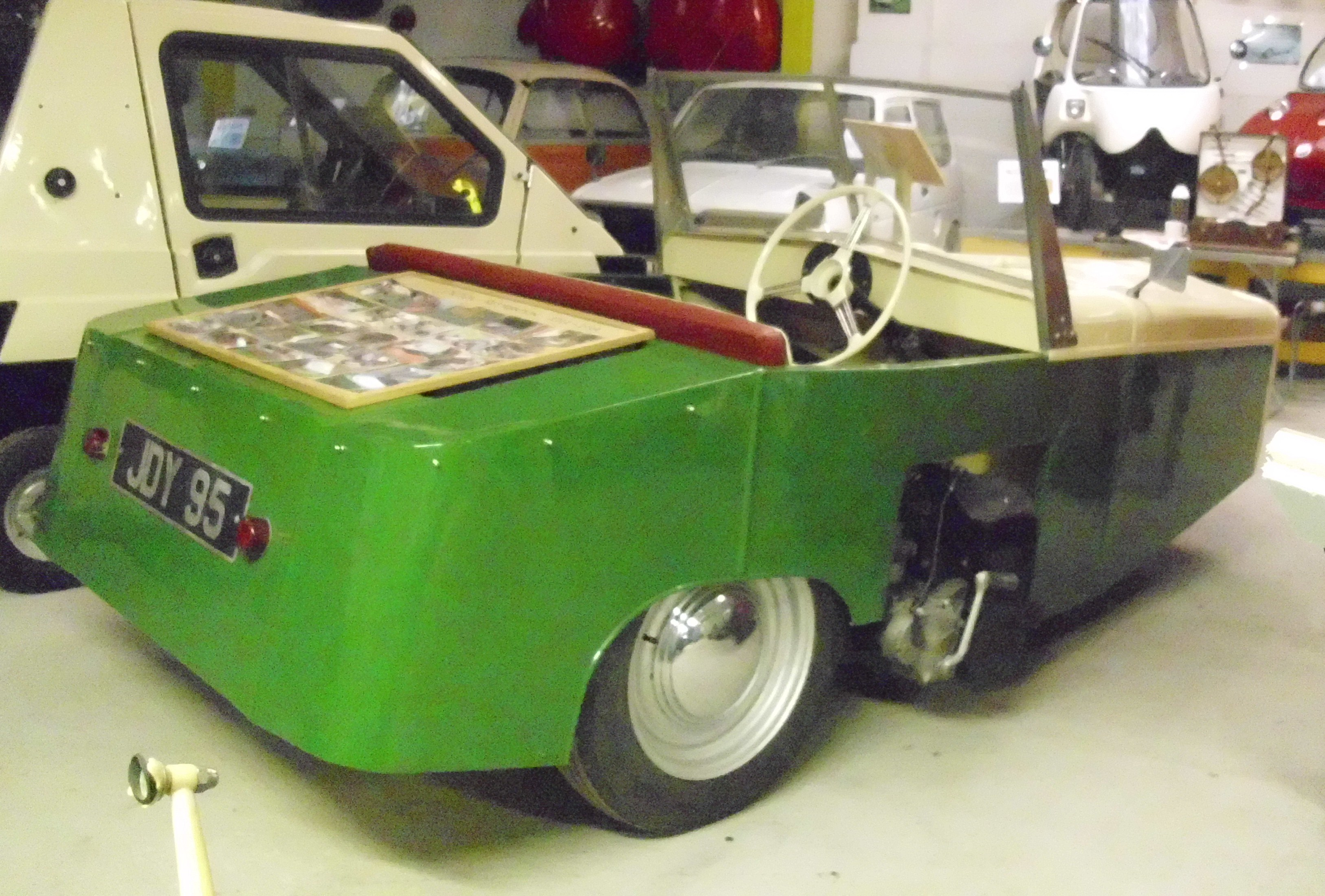
1956 Vernons Industries Gordon

The Gordon, made by Vernons Industries Ltd. based at Bidston, then in Cheshire (now Merseyside), was a British three-wheeled motorcar produced from 1954 until 1958.

The tricycle had a poor reputation for its build quality, flawed design and its terrible stability which was considered dangerous when driven in the wet as the vehicle could flip and catch fire.

== History ==
The company, a subsidiary of Vernons Pools, began in Bidston in 1954 for the production of automobiles. The designer was Erling Poppe who had previously worked for John Marston's Sunbeam car company in Wolverhampton. The Gordon's design was heavily criticized as the vehicle had a striking similar design to the popular mk1 Reliant Regal, so much so Reliant banned dealers from selling Gordons alongside Reliants.

The Gordon's main selling point was it was the UK's cheapest vehicle.

The poor design of the Gordon using its engine on the right hand side along with the weight of the driver made the car gain a reputation for turning over easily, raising another problem as its engine was exposed and could sever the fuel lines which could cause a fire.

Another design flaw was the Gordon was only one-wheel drive, the driver's side rear wheel is the only one powered by a chain from the engine, this means the car feels unstable especially in the wet.

Less than 1000 Gordons were made before production ended in 1958 after it gained its poor reputation.

== Models ==
The Gordon was the only vehicle manufactured, a three-wheeled two seater with a single front wheel. The single-cylinder, 197 cc, Villiers engine was mounted next to the driver (RHD), outside of the body with an external chain-drive to one rear wheel. Access to the interior was via a single door on the passenger side. The steel body had a folding fabric roof, and at £300 it was the cheapest car on the UK market.

The Gordon's cheap price could not help it sell because of the poor reputation it gained, the flaws in the design also could not be resolved without a complete redesign of the vehicle and this is why so few were built over four years using up final stocks in 1958 with the company deciding to leave the vehicle industry.

== See also ==
- List of car manufacturers of the United Kingdom

== Sources ==
- Harald Linz, Halwart Schrader: Die Internationale Automobil-Enzyklopädie. United Soft Media Verlag, München 2008, ISBN 978-3-8032-9876-8.
- George Nick Georgano (Chefredakteur): The Beaulieu Encyclopedia of the Automobile. Volume 2: G–O. Fitzroy Dearborn Publishers, Chicago 2001, ISBN 1-57958-293-1. (englisch)
