= Sunbeam S7 and S8 =

British motorcycles

Sunbeam S8
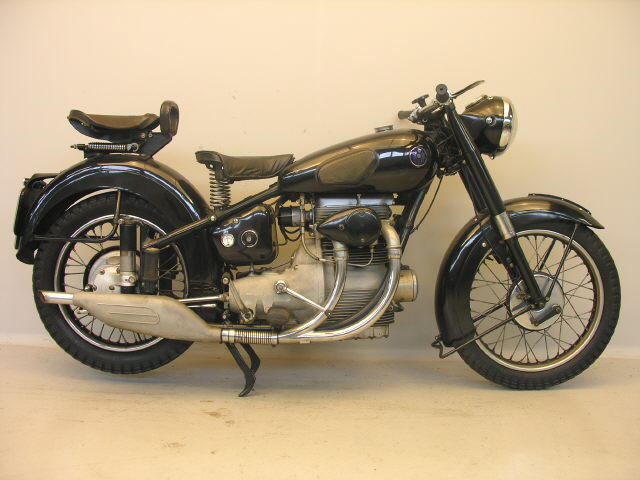
- Manufacturer: Sunbeam Cycles Limited (Subsidiary of BSA)
- Production: 1949–1956
- Engine: 487 cc parallel twin OHC four stroke
- Bore / stroke: 70.0 mm × 63.5 mm (2.76 in × 2.50 in)
- Power: 24 bhp (18 kW) @ 6,000 rpm
- Wheelbase: 57-inch (1,400 mm)
- Weight: 430 pounds (200 kg) (S7) 413 pounds (187 kg) (S8) (dry)

The Sunbeam S7 and S8 are British motorcycles designed by Erling Poppe with styling loosely based on the BMW R71 designs that were acquired as war reparations by BSA (full rights to the Sunbeam brand had been acquired from AMC in 1943). Built in Redditch, the unusual engine layout was similar to that of a car. The engine was a longitudinally mounted inline vertical OHC 500 cc twin based on an experimental 1932 BSA design (the Line-Ahead-Twin - LAT) with coil ignition and wet sump lubrication which, through a dry clutch, drove a shaft drive to the rear wheel. The inline engine made this technologically feasible—horizontally-opposed ("flat") twin engines on BMW motorcycles had already used shaft drives following the system employed by the four cylinder Nimbus since 1918. The early S7 was expensive and over engineered, which is why it is now the most sought-after and commands a premium over the S7 De Luxe and the S8, which were produced with fewer features to reduce costs, while retaining many of the innovative parts of the early Sunbeam and updating some ideas.

== Models ==
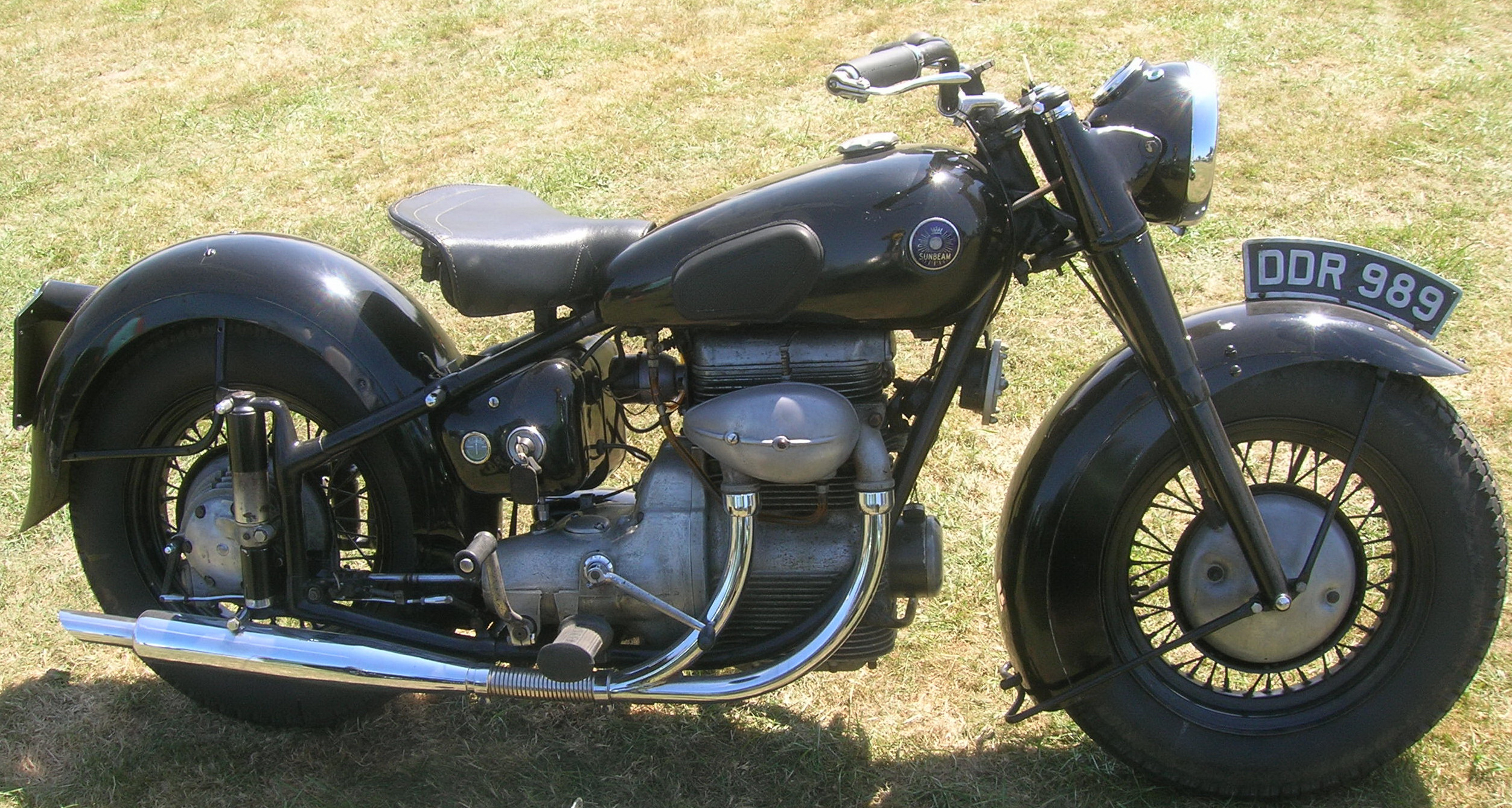
1950 Sunbeam S7

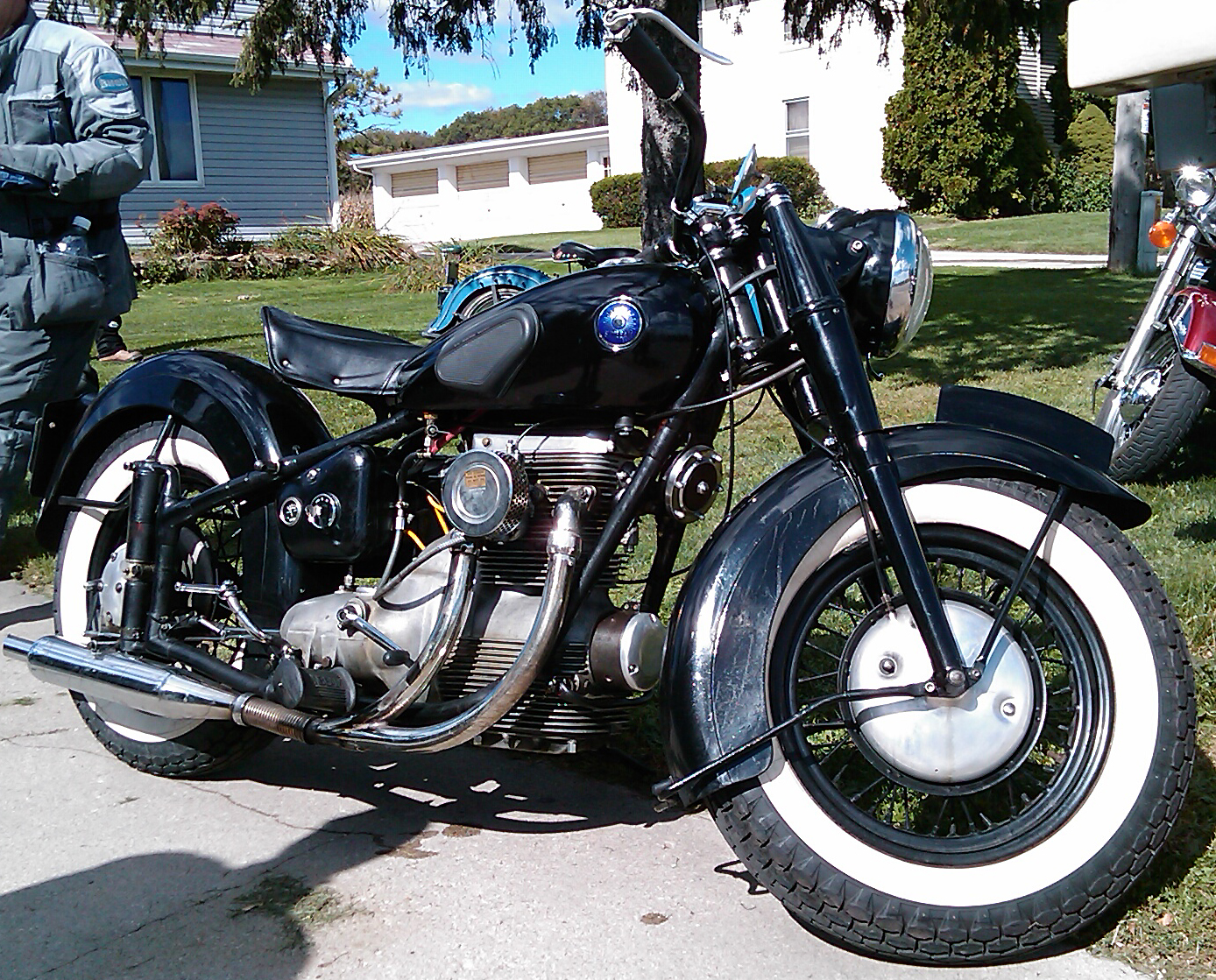
A mildly customised Sunbeam S7 motorcycle.

Three models were produced, the S7, S7 "de luxe" and the S8. All three were very expensive with only modest performance resulting in low sales. The original model was the S7 (the "Tourer") (2,104 produced from 1946 to 1948), in 1949 the S7 was updated to become the S7 de luxe (5,554 produced) and the S8 (8,530 produced). Both had new cylinder linings, redesigned frames and increased oil capacity. The lighter S8 was sold as a "sportier" model with a top speed of 85 mph (137 km/h). It also had new (BSA) forks, a cast aluminium silencer and chromed wheels (with narrower tyres to replace the 'balloon' tyres which had led to uncertain handling at speed). S9 and S10 models were planned but never made as BSA decided to concentrate on the more traditional twins. Another "sports" model was also tested but never put into production. This had a much higher compression ratio with a different OHC design but was never sold, reputedly because of the undampened front fork system which affected handling. There were also trials with a rigid version for a cheaper model but this design was also abandoned.

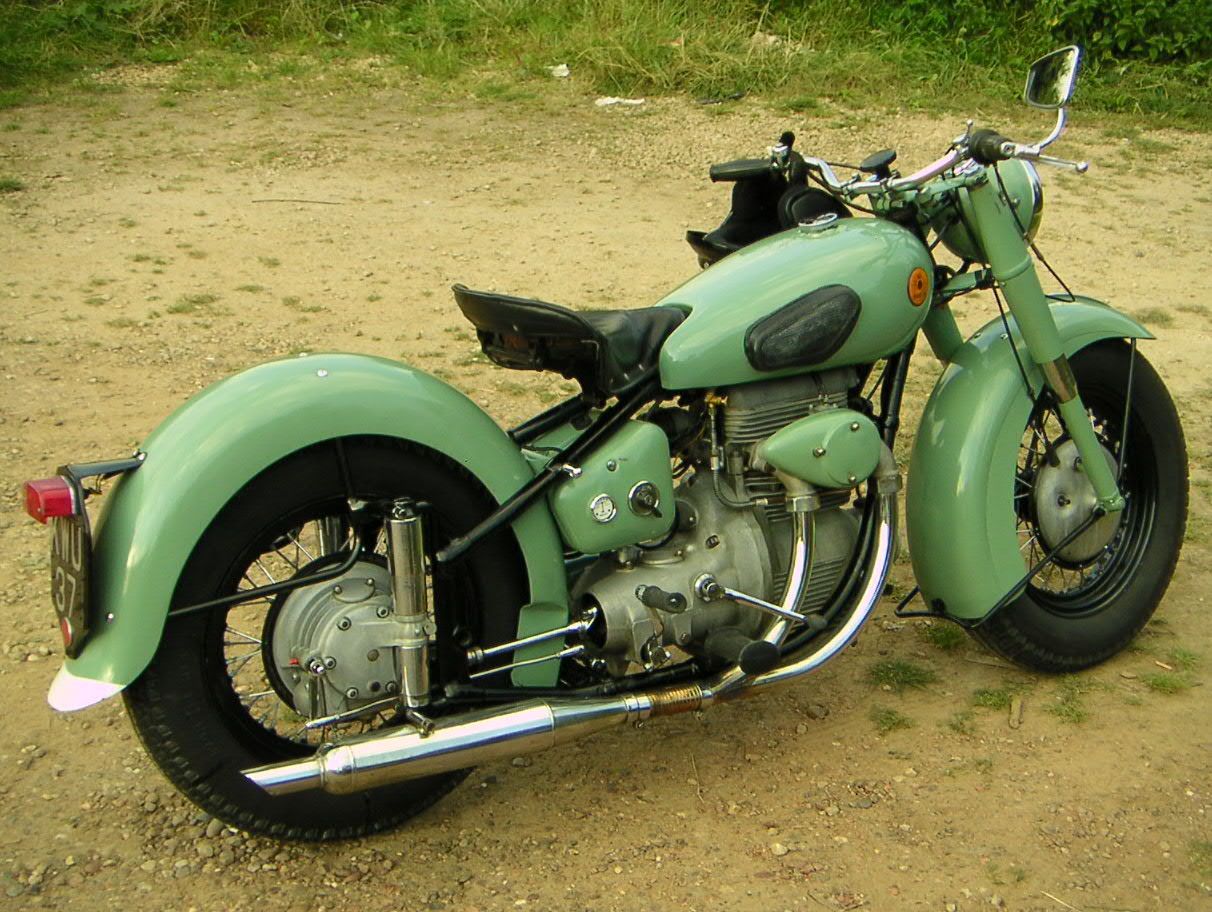
Mist Green S7 with characteristic balloon tyres

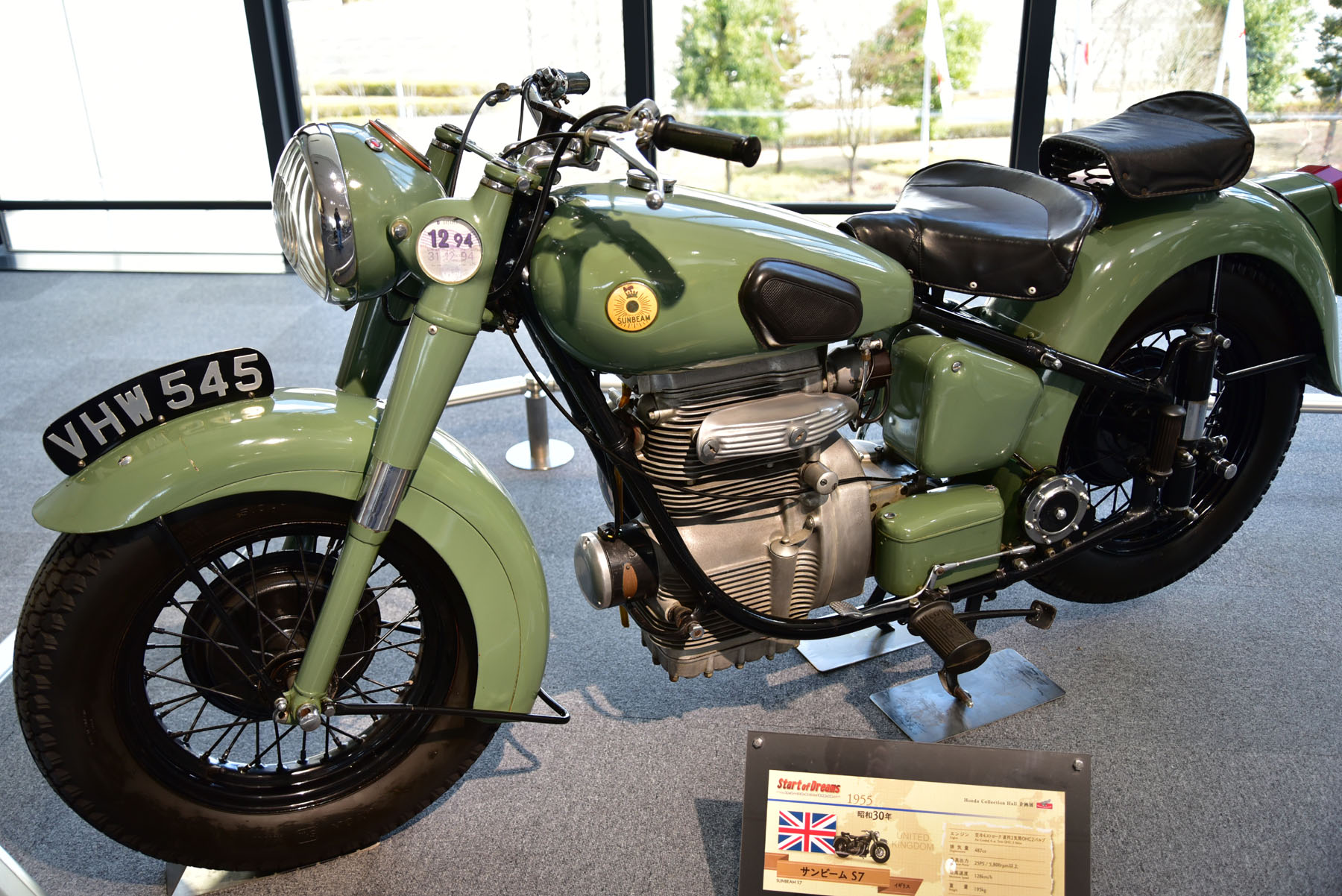
S7 Honda Collection Hall, Motegi, Japan

The original S7 was produced in black. The S7 de luxe came in either "Mist Green" or black and the S8 in "Silver Grey" or black. For export abroad BSA would supply Sunbeams in any BSA colour.

== Design problems ==
Erling Poppe's design was originally based on a captured BMW R75 but so soon after the end of the war BSA did not want the S series to look too "German", so an in-line OHC parallel twin was designed instead of a flat twin "across the frame". Serious problems with vibration made the new Sunbeam bikes uncomfortable to ride and the initial production originally sent to South Africa was recalled. The excessive vibration was cured by mounting the engine on two bonded rubber engine mounts.

The in-line engine was inherently suitable for shaft drive, and BMW-style bevel gears would have been ideal. However, having inherited some worm-gear machinery from the Lanchester Motor Company, BSA opted to specify worm drive rather than bevel gears. Reputedly this created problems with the shaft drive, as the gears tended to strip under power. It is said that Sunbeam's "solution" to this was to reduce the power to 24 bhp (18 kW), which did nothing to help post-war sales.

== Owners clubs ==
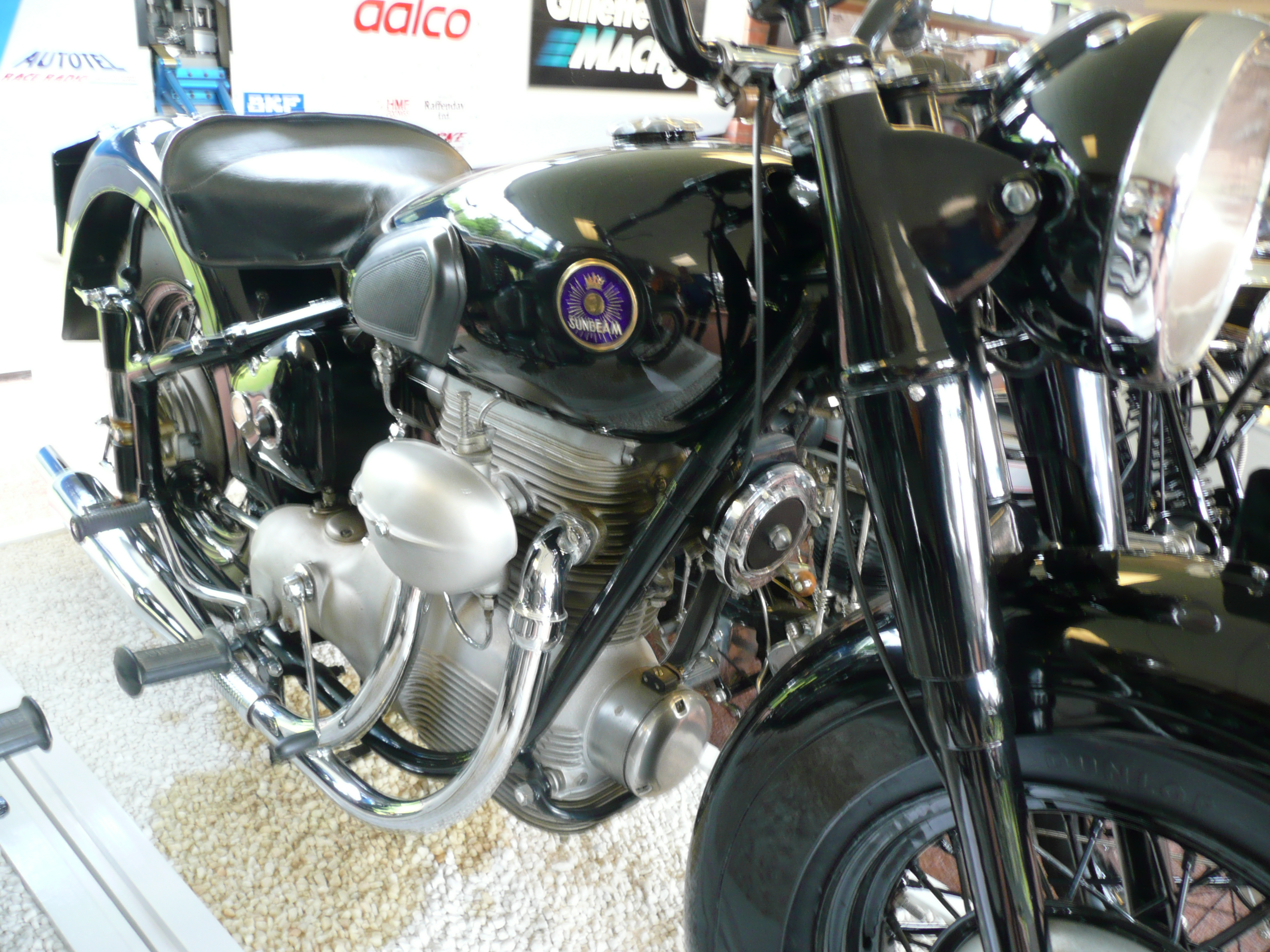
1947 S7 at the National Motorcycle Museum (UK).

The Sunbeam Motor Cycle Club is one of the longest established in the UK and was founded in July 1924 at the London showrooms of John Marston Ltd in Holborn Viaduct who made the Sunbeam motorcycles in their factory at Wolverhampton. The Sunbeam Motor Cycle Club is, however, a sporting motorcycle club that organises trials and vintage bike rallies and runs and the "owners section" was just a small part of it. When Sunbeam production ended BSA sold the remaining stock of parts to Stewart Engineering. Bob and Chines Stewart were longtime fans of the Sunbeam and for a time members of the Sunbeam Motorcycle Club. In 1963 they, along with other enthusiasts, broke away from the Sunbeam Motorcycle Club and formed the Sunbeam Owners Fellowship (SOF) to support owners of an S7 or S8 with any problems. A good number of Sunbeams motorcycles survive in perfect working order and many owners have been fellows of the SOF since its inception, having owned their Sunbeam since bought new or second hand in the 1960s.

A web-based owners club has been created.

== See also ==
- List of motorcycles of the 1940s
- List of motorcycles of the 1950s
