= Ducati Monster 1200S =

Model of motorcycle

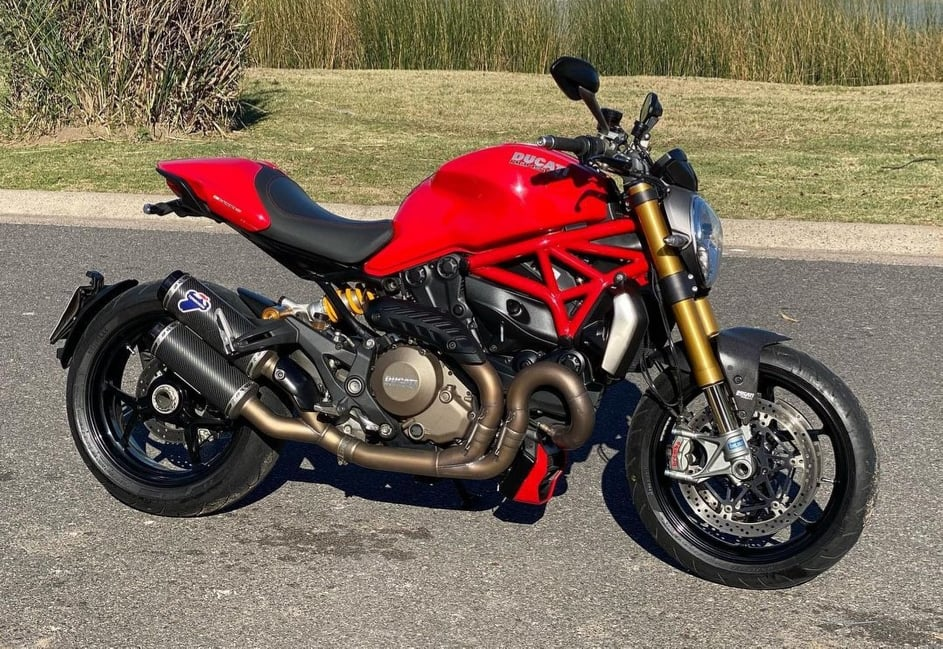
- Manufacturer: Ducati
- Also called: Il Mostro
- Parent company: Volkswagen Group
- Production: 2013-2020
- Predecessor: Ducati Monster 1100 EVO
- Successor: Ducati Monster 1200R
- Class: Naked
- Engine: 1,198 cc (73.1 cu in) Testastretta 11° DS, L-Twin cylinders, four valves per cylinder, Desmodromic, liquid cooled
- Bore / stroke: 106.0 mm × 67.9 mm (4.17 in × 2.67 in)
- Power: 147 hp (110 kW)@ 9,250 rpm
- Torque: 124 Nm (12,6 kgf-m ou 91,5 ft.lbs) @ 7750 RPM
- Transmission: 6 speed
- Wheelbase: 1,485 mm (58.5 in)
- Seat height: Adjustable 795 mm (31.3 in)- 820 mm (32 in)
- Weight: 187 kg (412 lb) (dry)
- Fuel capacity: 16.5 L (3.6 imp gal; 4.4 US gal)

The Ducati Monster 1200S is a standard or "naked" motorcycle, made by Ducati from 2014 through 2021.

== Background ==
When the Italian manufacturer decided they wanted a vehicle that didn't appear like a race replica or anything else in their lineup in 1993, they built the first Monster. To try to attract a new sort of rider and promote much-needed sales, they completely removed the fairings, as well as anything else deemed unnecessary. Rather than engineering a completely new chassis, Ducati engineers stayed with what they knew and constructed the naked bike around the company's famous steel trellis frame. From the success of the first M900 model, Ducati was able to claim a new business of the motorcycle market which is the sports naked category.

The M900 received fuel injection at the start of the 2000s, which increased output by 11 bhp. It also came with a new digital dash and Showa forks, which were previously only available on the 'S' model. The lesser capacity Monster 600 and M750 received the fuel injection treatment a few years later, before Ducati launched the first water-cooled Monster, the S4, in 2001. The S4 was powered by an updated version of Ducati's Desmoquattro engine, which produced 101 bhp and made it the most powerful Monster to date. Although it was still 'Monster' in look, the S4 sparked debate among Monster fans at the time because of its liquid-cooled engine, which broke with tradition and came with many pipes and hoses that they didn't care for. However, it's the things that got changed later on.

In 2013, Ducati launched the Monster 1200 at the EICMA show in Italy. The model replaces the Monster 1100 EVO with a new Testastretta 11 engine, 1,198 cc, 2-Cylinder L-twin, 4 valve, liquid-cooled. This model was the most powerful Monster before being replaced by the 1200R in 2016.

== Concept and design ==
Ducati Monster 1200s Speed test

The Ducati Monster 1200 is a naked sports bike. It developed with a new headlight and design. Ducati designers were inspired by the fundamentals of the Monster's 1993 model in the concept of a "sport naked bike."

The Monster 1200 has new features and design, but it retains Ducati's signature naked style. The Monster 1200 has a slimmer tank and new technological headlight flanked by LED front position lights, as well as LED brake and indicators. The instrumentation features a completely configurable TFT (thin-film transistor) display with three alternative displays (Sport, Touring, and Urban) to suit the selected Ducati Riding Mode. Another major change is the three Y-spokes with exclusive "S" graphics and a front carbon mudguard, and the DRL (Daytime Running Light) system in the front headlight.

The 1200S has a 90° V-twin engine, called an L-twin by Ducati, with Desmodromic valves Design by Miguel Angel Galluzzi and produced by Ducati in Bologna, Italy. The 1200S is the second top model of the Monster (the R version is top model in Monster's series). It has a 1,198cc V-twin engine with four-valve Desmodromic heads that produces 147 bhp and 91 ft-lb of torque, which is based on the former Superbike engine.

With a single-sided cast aluminum swingarm, Ohlins suspension, and Brembo M50 Evo radial brake calipers, that big engine is contained in a steel tube trellis frame. It's essentially a Superbike chassis modified for road use.
