= Aldimi =

- Production: 1953–1956
- Class: Scooter
- Engine: 125 cc, 200 cc Saroléa

The Aldimi motorcycle was manufactured in Belgium between 1953 and 1956, and was a scooter powered by a 200 cc Salolera engine. The company later imported Piatti scooters. Aldimi scooters had special 125- or 200 cc Saroléa engine blocks and also a distinctive build. The only model ever produced by Aldimi was called "Prince de Liège" (Prince of Liège).
