= Ducati Monster 696 =

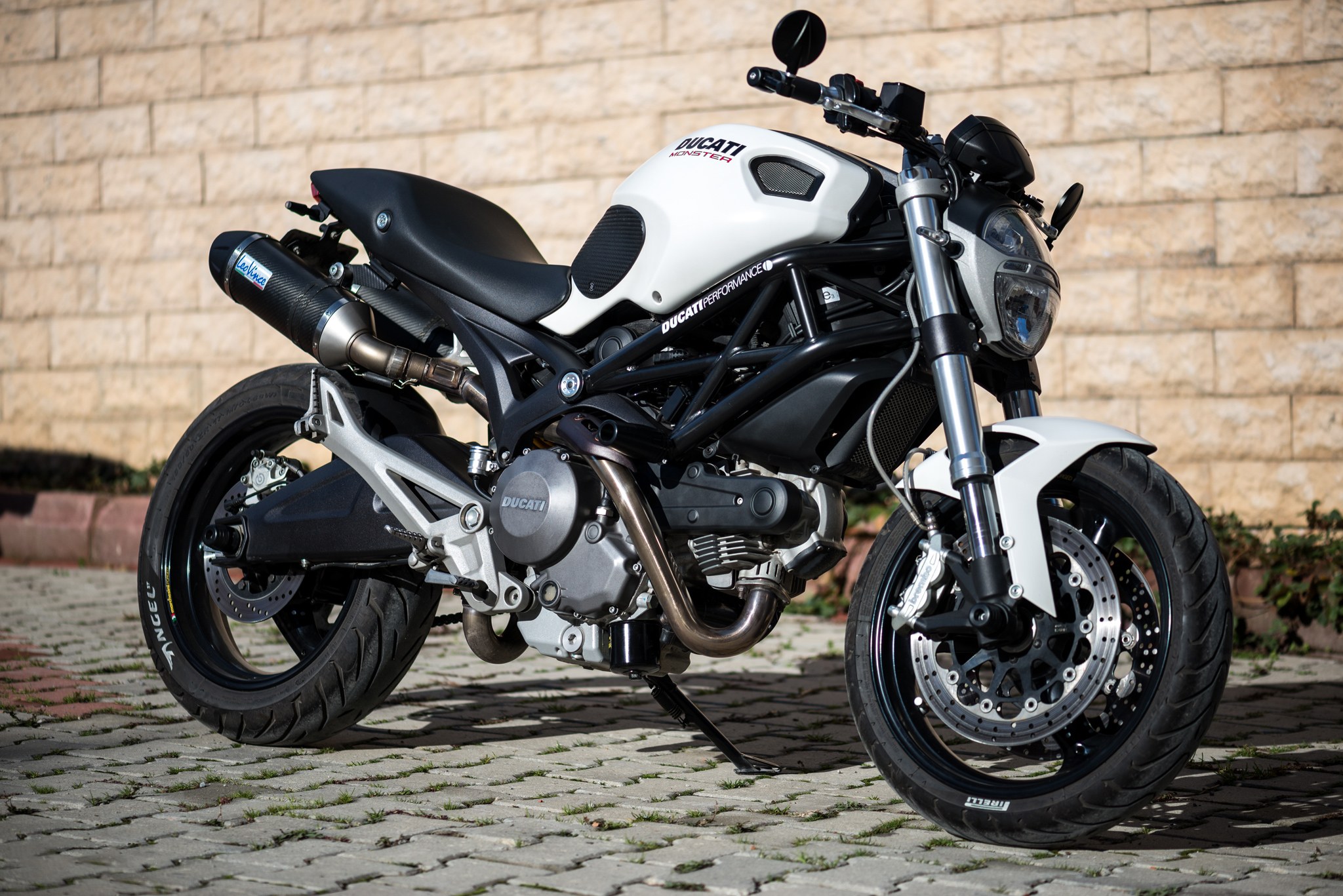
- Manufacturer: Ducati
- Also called: Il Mostro
- Parent company: Lamborghini
- Production: 2007–2014
- Predecessor: Monster 695
- Successor: Monster 797
- Class: Naked
- Engine: 695.79 cc (42.460 cu in), 2 valve, 2 cyl, 4 stroke desmodromic air cooled 90° V-twin
- Bore / stroke: 88.0 mm × 57.2 mm (3.46 in × 2.25 in)
- Compression ratio: 10.7:1
- Power: 80 hp (58.8 kW) @ 9000 rpm
- Torque: 69 Nm (50 ft-lb) at 7750 rpm
- Transmission: 6 speed
- Frame type: Tubular steel trellis frame
- Suspension: Front: Showa (later Marzocchi) 43 mm upside-down fork Rear: Sachs Progressive linkage with preload and rebound Sachs adjustable monoshock
- Brakes: Front: Two 320 mm (13 in) discs, Brembo radial 4-piston calipers Rear: One 245 mm (9.6 in) disc, Brembo 2-piston caliper
- Tires: Pirelli Angel ST; Front: 120/60 ZR 17; Rear: 160/60 ZR 17
- Rake, trail: 24°, 87 mm (3.4 in)
- Wheelbase: 1,450 mm (57 in)
- Dimensions: L: 2,100 mm (83 in); W: 780 mm (31 in)
- Seat height: 770 mm (30 in)
- Weight: 161 kg (355 lb); 163 kg (359 lb) ABS Ver. (dry); 185 kg (408 lb) (wet)
- Fuel capacity: 15 L (3.3 imp gal; 4.0 US gal); 13.5 L (3.0 imp gal; 3.6 US gal) ABS Ver. including 3.5 L (0.77 imp gal; 0.92 US gal) reserve

The Ducati Monster 696 is a standard or "naked" motorcycle, made by Ducati from 2008 through 2014.

== Background ==
Since its launch in 1993, Ducati had sold over 200,000 Monsters, which at one time amounted to 60% of Ducati's production. The initial Monster was cheap and easy to build and has remained so during its long life. Ducati's "less-is-more" rationale of the Monster range aimed to combine high performance in a compact motorcycle. Ducati recently updated the Monster range, with redesigned components to improve performance and appearance. In 2022 Will Burgess repurposed one of these to make a custom Carbon Fibre Monster 696.

== Specifications ==
=== Engine and drivetrain ===
The engine is the "Desmodue", a 90° L-twin, 696 cc (42.5 cu in) 58.8 kW (78.9 hp) air-cooled engine with desmodromic valve actuation. A slipper clutch prevents locking of the rear wheel through clumsy down-shifting. Although Ducatis often use a dry clutch, this model has a 21-plate oil-bath "wet clutch" which weighs less, gives quieter operation, and needs less maintenance.

=== Frame and body ===
The Monster has a steel trellis frame and a lightweight aluminum subframe. The claimed dry weight is 161 kg (355 lb)(non-ABS).

The seat height is 770 mm (30 in), which may make it easier for some riders to plant their feet firmly on the ground. This is a benefit for inexperienced motorcyclists.

=== Brakes ===
The Monster's brake system components including master cylinders and discs are supplied by Brembo. The front has 320 mm floating dual discs and radially mounted 4 piston Brembo p4.32 calipers. The 245 mm rear solid disc have a two-piston p34 caliper. Anti-lock braking system (ABS) is optional.

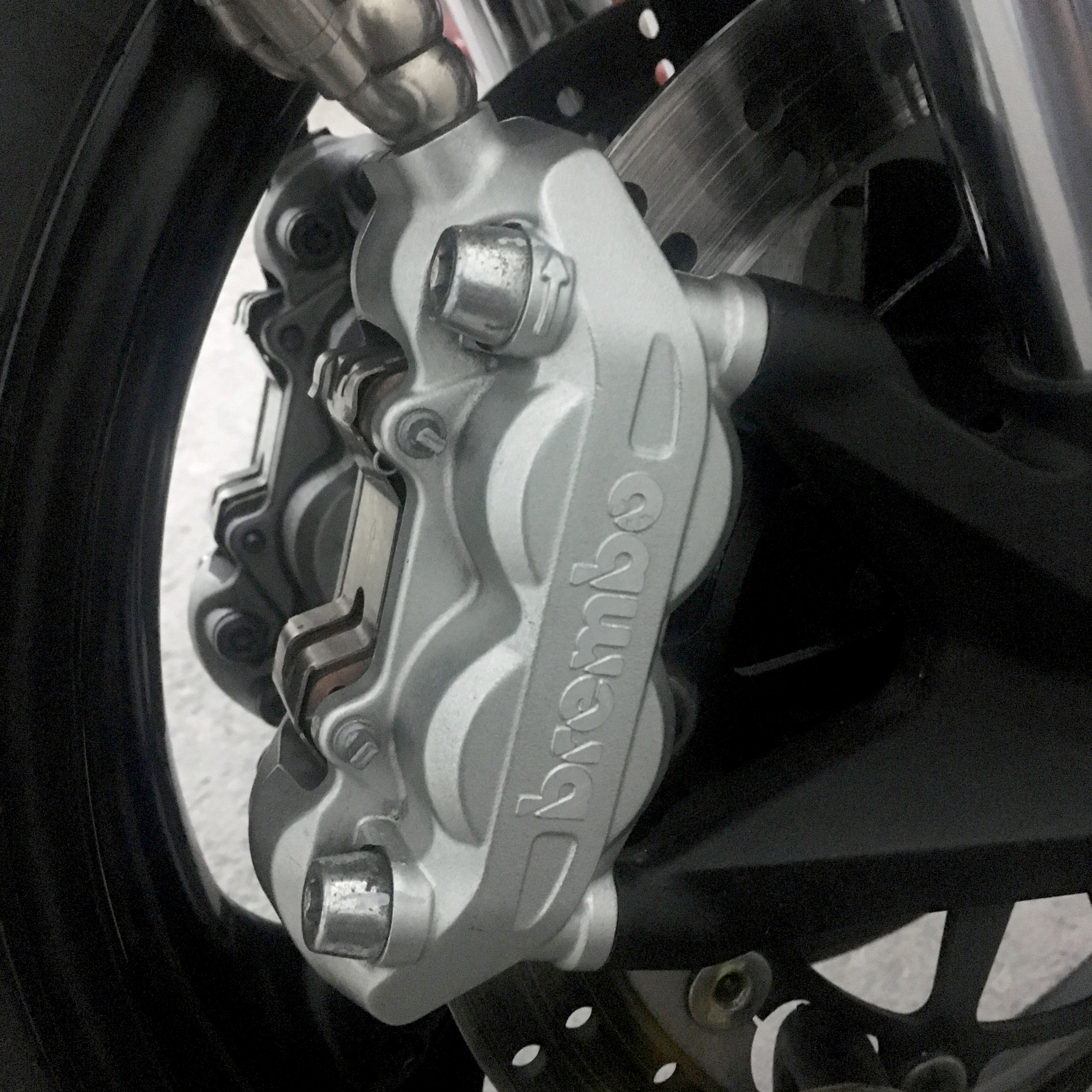
Brembo Front Right Brake Caliper on a 2013 Ducati Monster 696 non-ABS
