= Ducati Monster =

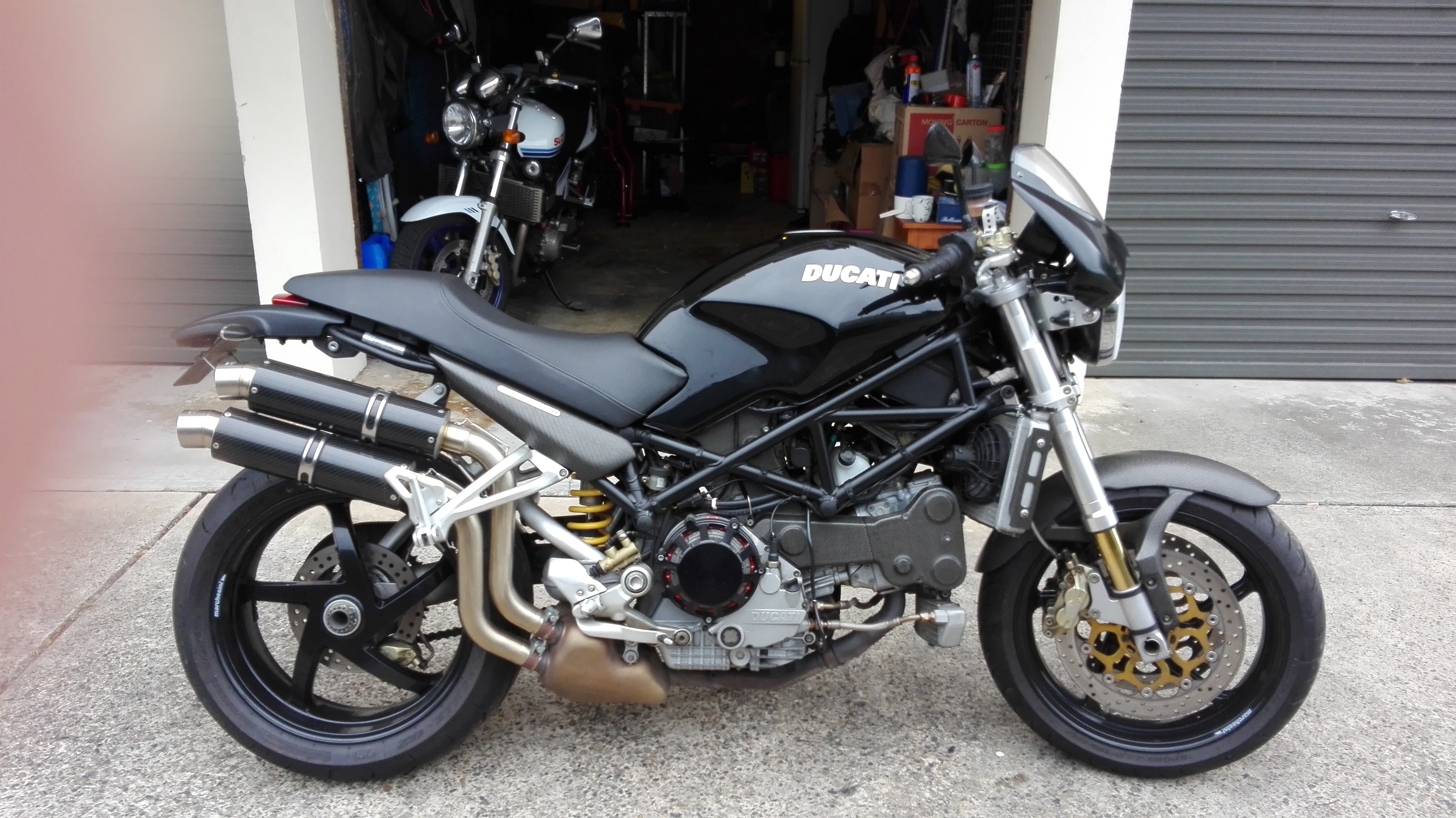
- 2003 Ducati Monster S4R
- Manufacturer: Ducati
- Production: 1991–present
- Class: Standard
- Engine: 90° V-twin, desmodromic valves
- Transmission: 5-speed (M600) and 6-speed sequential manual transmission, chain-drive
- Frame type: Tubular steel trellis
- Rake, trail: 24°
- Wheelbase: 1,440 mm (57 in) (typical)
- Seat height: 770–800 mm (30–31 in)

The Ducati Monster is a standard, or naked bike, motorcycle designed by Miguel Angel Galluzzi and produced by Ducati in Bologna, Italy, since 1991. In 2005, Monster sales accounted for over half of Ducati's worldwide sales. Like most modern Ducati motorcycles, it has a 90° V-twin engine, called an L-twin by Ducati, with desmodromic valves, and tubular steel trellis frame, designed by Fabio Taglioni (1920–2001).

The Monster line has had numerous variations over the years, from entry level 400 cc (24 cu in) bikes up to top-of-the-line 160 hp (120 kW) multivalve, water-cooled superbike-engined versions, with as many as nine different Monster versions in a single model year. The Monster's elemental simplicity has also made it a favorite platform for custom motorcycle builders, showcased at competitions like the Monster Challenge. Monsters eventually accounted for two-thirds or more of Ducati's output.

British weekly newspaper Motorcycle News commented in December 2016: "The Monster has gone down in folklore as 'the bike that saved Ducati' due to its popularity and cheap development costs", adding that approximately 300,000 had been produced.

== History ==
=== Conception and design ===
The Monster began as a styling exercise in 1992. The concept for the Monster was one Galluzzi had been thinking about for some time, and it took time to convince the management at Cagiva and Ducati to build it. Ducati technical director Massimo Bordi originated the idea for what they wanted the new bike to accomplish, and assigned the design to Galluzzi. Bordi said he asked Galluzzi "for something which displayed a strong Ducati heritage but which was easy to ride and not a sports bike. He came up with a proposal and I thought, this was the bike Marlon Brando would be riding today in the film The Wild One!" Bordi's intent was to enter the cruiser market, with a bike that was made to be modified and would eventually have a wealth of bolt-on aftermarket accessories rivaling the range of custom and hot-rod parts available for Harley-Davidsons. Previously Cagiva had attempted to move into this market with a cruiser, the Ducati Indiana of 1986–1990. Some sources stated that it made poor use of Ducati's desmodromic valve V-twin engines; and a full-cradle frame, not Ducati's signature trellis, playing against Ducati's stylistic strengths. Only 2,138 were made over four years. The Monster appealed to the same urban, style-conscious buyers who wanted a bike that could make an individualistic statement, but it did so with a motorcycle that they had not quite seen before, and was still unmistakably Italian and a Ducati.

Because Bordi wanted Galluzzi to keep costs low, the Monster was a humble "parts bin special," built not with newly designed components carefully engineered to work in unison, but by mixing and matching parts from existing Ducati models, beginning with the engine and of a 900 Supersport, a frame descended from the 851 superbike, and the fork of a 750 Supersport. Galluzzi penned a "muscular" fuel tank and minimalist bodywork that produced a visual impression of mass and strength, on a motorcycle that turned out to be surprisingly tiny and agile to the first time rider. Motorcycle Consumer News design columnist Glynn Kerr described the Monster's statement as aggressive, "attributable to the head-down, charging bull stance." The trellis frame in the Ducati Monster is an integral part of the motorcycle's design allowing for both aesthetic appeal and for structural efficiency.

=== 1990s ===
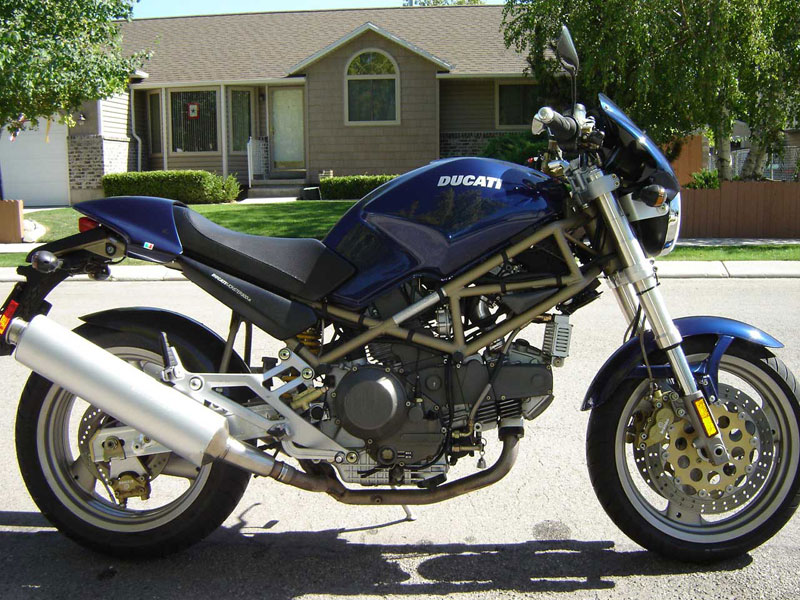
1999 Ducati Monster 900 City

Ducati introduced three Monster models in its first generation: the M600, M750, and M900 (the numbers denote engine sizes). The first M900 was shipped in 1991, the M600 shipped in 1994, and finally the M750 arrived in 1996. In 1998 Ducati introduces its Monster Dark range of motorcycles with the release of the M600 Dark. In 1999, to close out existing stock of Monster parts, Ducati released several limited edition Monsters many with different levels of accessories, the most notable was the Monster City, which came in a unique blue color and had leather briefcase style saddlebags and higher handlebars.

From 1994, a smaller displacement model, the M400, was built for specific markets where the tax or license system is particularly harsh on larger capacity or more powerful motorcycles. The M400 was mainly intended for Italy, Japan, and Singapore but was also exported to regions such as Indonesia, the Philippines, Taiwan, and Thailand. The M400 was based on the M600 with the same basic engine components, but a shorter stroke crankshaft and smaller diameter pistons.

Miguel Galluzzi began work on designing a second generation Monster but when Ducati was sold by parent company Cagiva in 1998 Galluzzi and the new design remained with Cagiva as Galluzzi never officially worked for Ducati. Cagiva worked with then-subsidiary MV Agusta to produce the tubular steel trellis frame and contracted with Suzuki to provide engines of similar dimensions and specification to the intended Ducati L-twins. Released in 1999 as a 2000 model year the Cagiva Raptor retained a legal production plate that reads "MV Agusta Motor S.p.A. Cagiva M2", M2 denoting Monster 2. Without the Galluzzi redesign the Monster frame would remain mostly unchanged until the launch of the Monster 696 in 2007.

=== 2000s ===
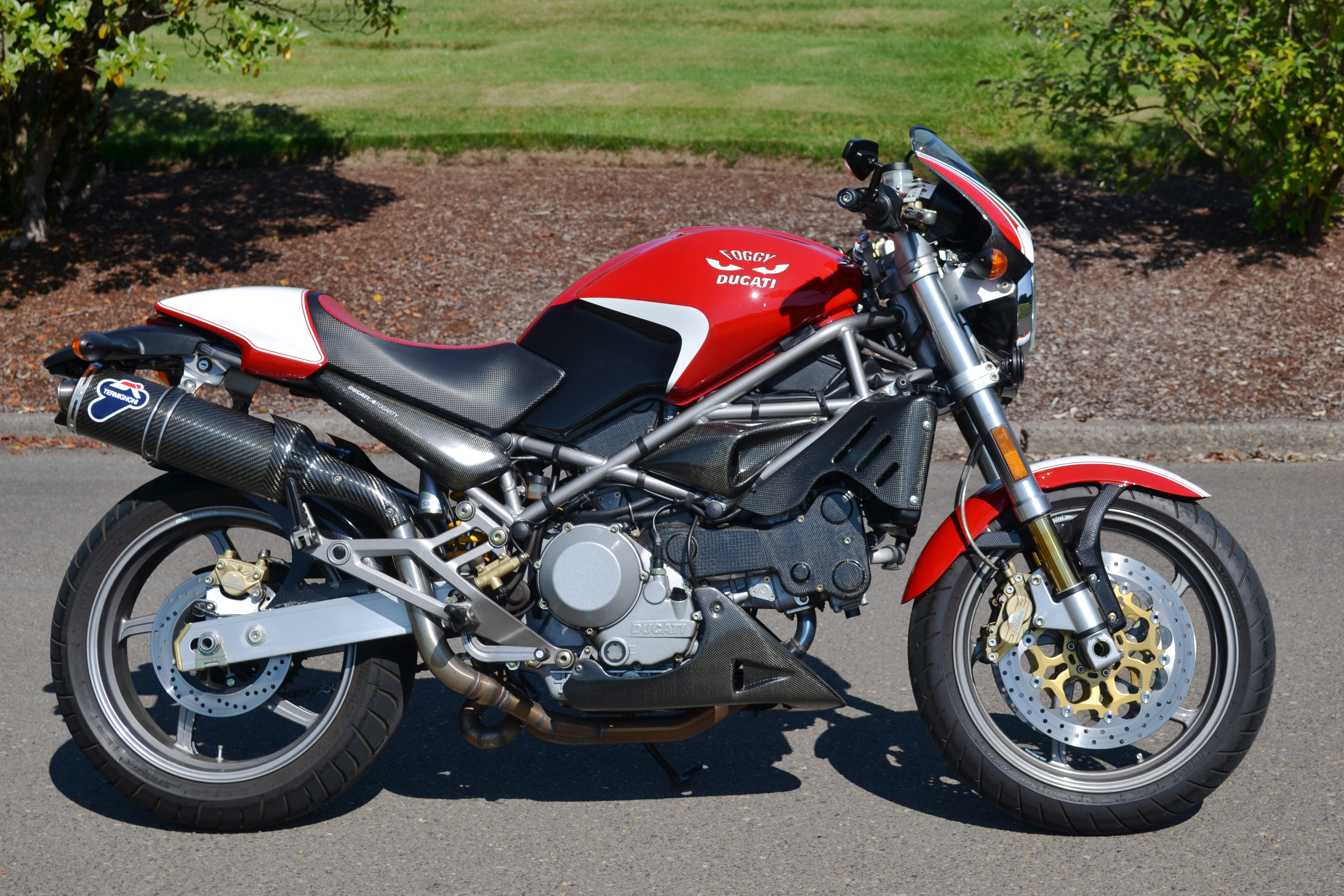
2002 Ducati S4 Foggy

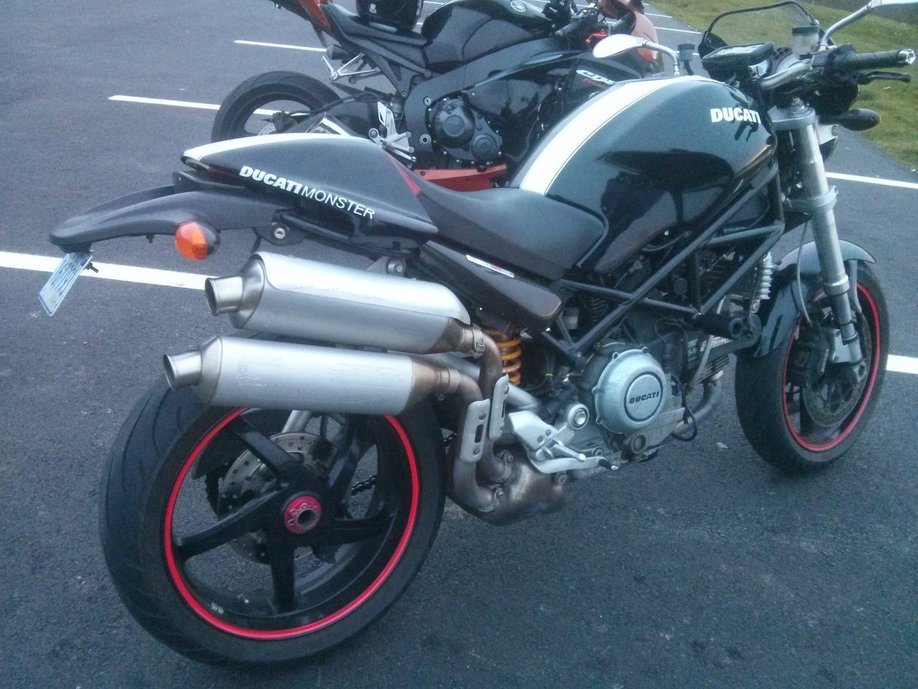
2007 Monster S2R1000

The bike remained relatively unchanged until 2000, when Ducati added fuel injection to the M900 model. Perhaps more importantly, in 2001 Ducati introduced the S4, which added the liquid-cooled four-valve Superbike engine to the stable. Other technical changes that year included semi-floating front disc brakes with Brembo four-piston calipers, lighter Brembo wheels as well as 43 mm Showa inverted forks. That same year also included upgraded instrumentation with the addition of a tachometer on all Monster models. 2002 saw the introduction of the limited, 300 edition, high-spec, S4, named after four time Ducati Superbike Champion, Carl 'Foggy' Fogarty.

2003 saw the S4R arrive with the 996 engine, and twin high rise mufflers on the right hand side with a single sided swingarm along with an increase in power (113HP) and torque over the 916-powered S4. Motorcycle Sport & Leisure commented that, at the time of introduction, it was "...the most powerful naked bike ever produced by the Italian firm...".

In November 2005, a new top of the range model was announced: the S4RS Testastretta. This new model uses the engine from the 999 Superbike with Öhlins suspension front and rear and radial front brakes. Also in 2005, Ducati added the S2R Desmodue (two-valved Desmodromic engine) line to the Monster family: styled akin to the four-valve S4R, but with the simpler two-valve 800 cc and 1,000 cc motors in the S2R 800 and S2R 1000, respectively. February 2006 marked the announcement of the 2007 Monster 695. It replaced the Monster 620 and was introduced June 2006.

The Monster 696 was announced in November 2007, and officially launched early April 2008 in Barcelona. Its 696 V-twin has the highest power output per cc of any Ducati air-cooled engine. The Monster 1100 was announced in September 2008. Based on the Monster 696, it comes with a larger 1078 cc engine, a single sided swingarm, radial brake calipers, larger forks and taller suspension. In 2009, Ducati sold over 12,000 696 models, the first of their motorcycles to sell over 10,000 bikes in one year. The 1100 S model has fully adjustable Öhlins suspension components, a different colour scheme and aluminium brake disc carriers, which account for a 1 kg weight reduction.

=== 2010s ===
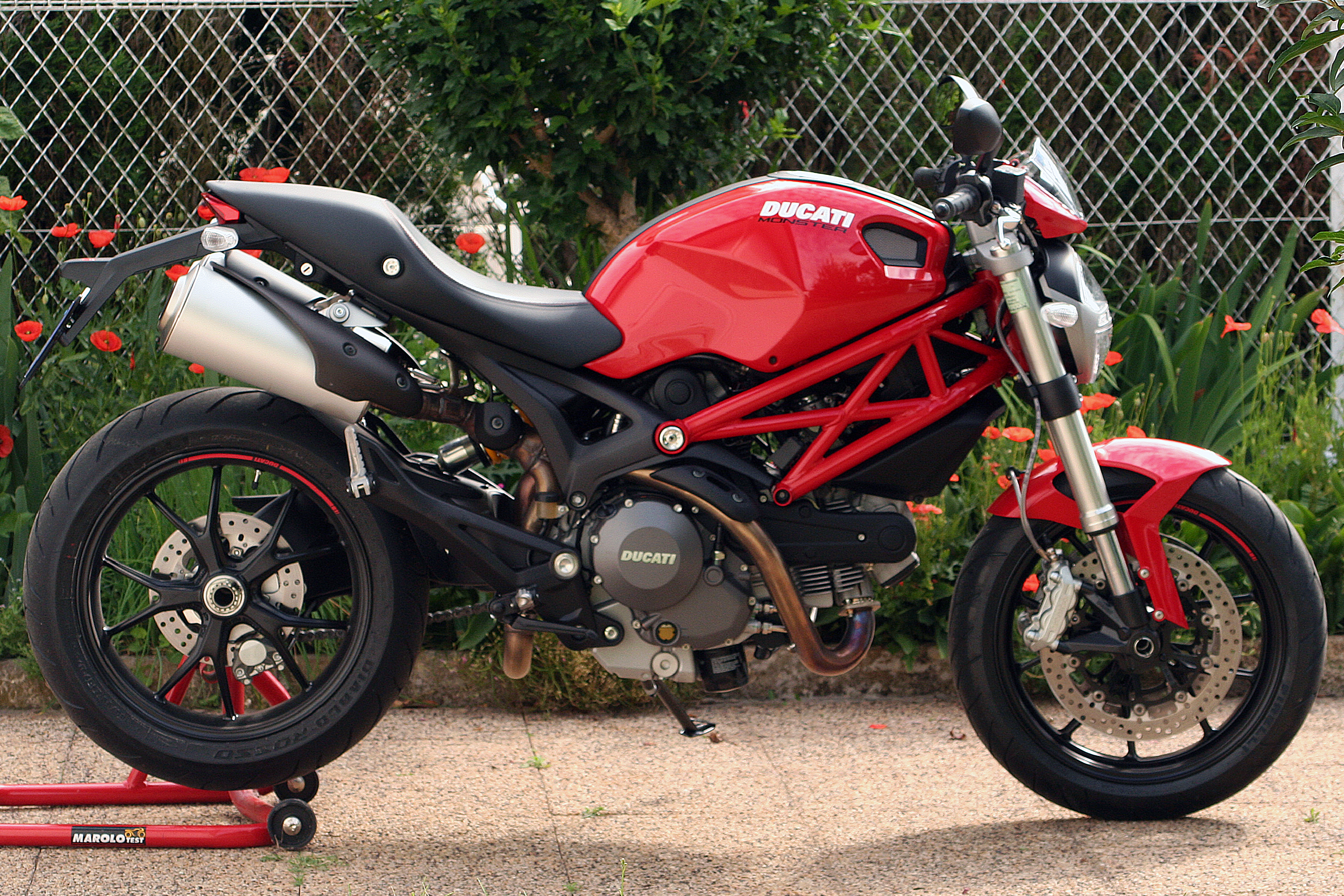
2010 Ducati Monster 796

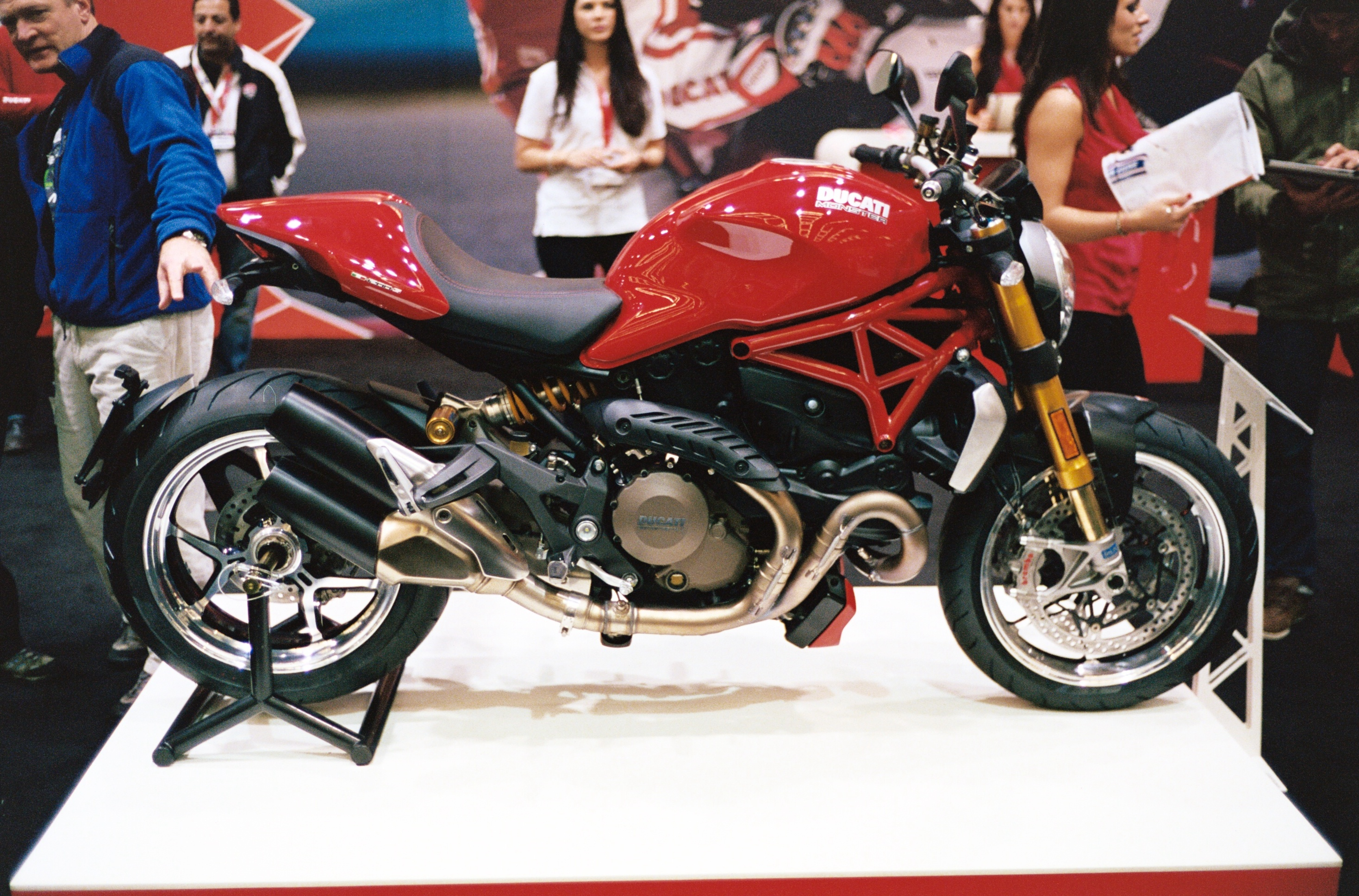
2014 Ducati Monster 1200

In April 2010, the Monster 796 was announced, producing a factory-claimed 87 hp (65 kW).

In November 2010, Ducati announced the Monster 1100 Evo, replacing the Monster 1100 and 1100s. The exhaust was moved to the side as opposed to underneath the seat, and the dry clutch changed for a wet clutch. Also, there was a change in the paint schemes. Another major change is the inclusion of Ducati Safety Package (DSP) which is standard with the motorcycle. This DSP consists of ABS and Ducati Traction Control.

In October 2011, Ducati unveiled a new addition to the Monster family, the 795. Essentially a 696 frame with the larger 803cc engine from the 796, the 795 is aimed specifically at the Asian market and assembled in a plant in Thailand.

In November 2013 at EICMA, Ducati introduced the 2014 Monster 1200 and 1200S, with a watercooled four valve 135/145 hp 1198 Testastretta 11 engine. It replaced the Monster 1100 Evo.

The 796 was replaced by the Monster 821 in mid 2014, equipped with the 821 cc Testastretta from the hyper line, and incorporating the same electronics suite as the monster 1200.

In 2016 the new Monster 1200 R was added. Ducati said it was the most powerful Monster ever, with a more track-oriented design. Ducati claimed the engine produced 97 lb⋅ft (132 N⋅m) torque, and 160 hp (120 kW), 15 hp (11 kW) more than the Monster 1200 S. It has the same Testastretta 11° DS, 90-degree V-twin used in the Multistrada and Diavel. It has an Öhlins suspension front and rear and a 1,509 mm (59.4 in) wheelbase compared to 1,511 mm (59.5 in) for the S model. The claimed wet weight is 207 kg (456 lb). The rear tire has a 200-section, somewhat greater than the 1200 S's 190 width.

Ducati first showed the Monster 797 at the 2016 EICMA Motor Show in Milan, positioning it as the new entry level Monster. Sales in most markets began that year, expanding to India in 2017. It has a 803 cc, Desmodue, twin-cylinder, air-cooled engine. It has a 6-speed gearbox.

=== 2020s ===
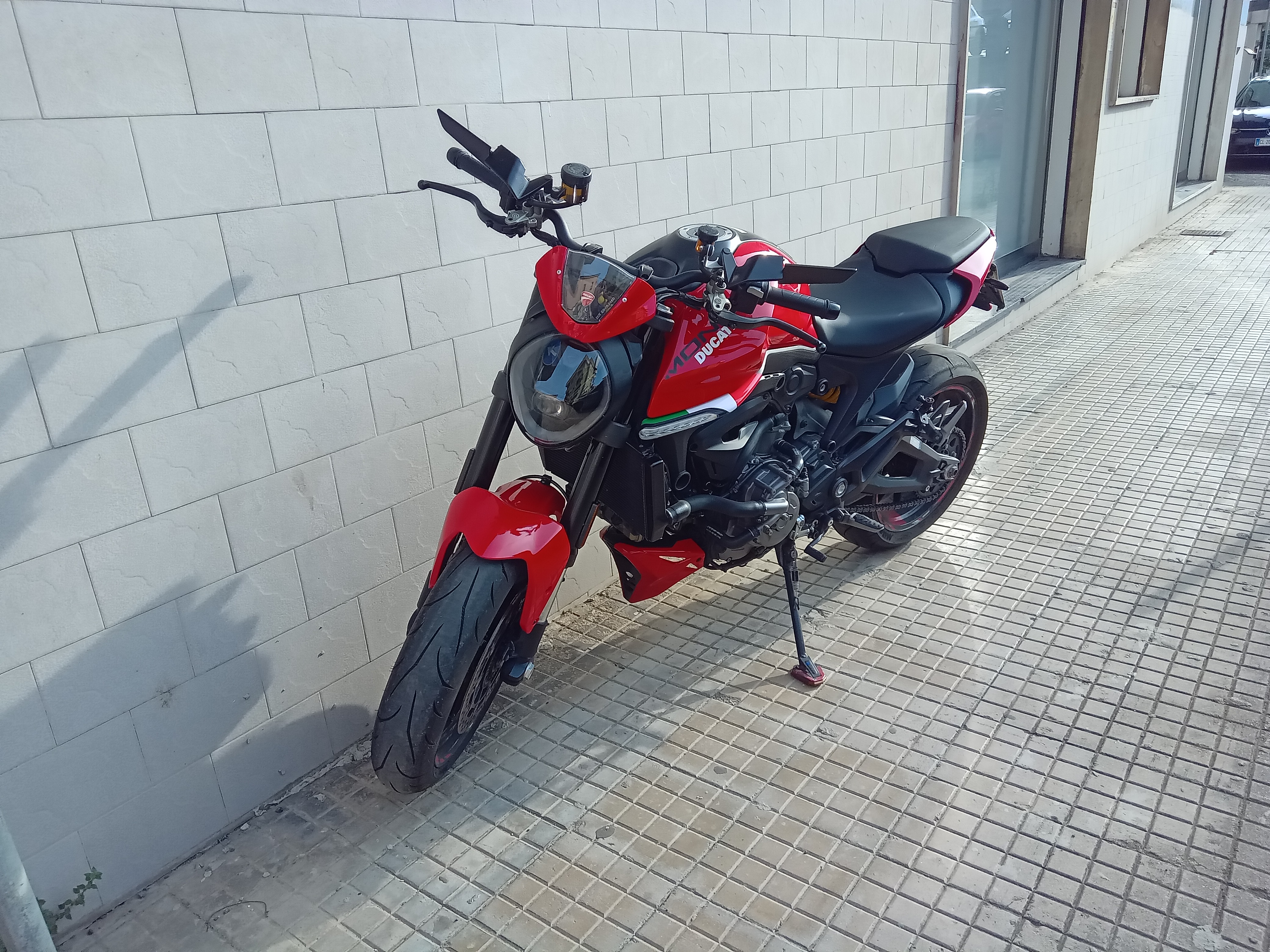
2024 Ducati Monster 937

On December 2, 2020, four new models were announced, the all-new 2021 Ducati Monster, Ducati Monster Plus, Ducati Monster 1200 and Ducati Monster 1200s. The base Monster had with the 937 cc Testastretta 11° V-twin engine. The Ducati Monster 1200 and 1200 S is equipped with a 1198 cc Testastretta 11° V-twin engine. The 1200 S has an Öhlins suspension, 330 mm front brake discs with higher-spec Brembo calipers and light weight wheels.
