= Suzuki TS50ER =

- Manufacturer: Suzuki
- Production: 1979–1983
- Engine: 49 cc (3.0 cu in), air-cooled single
- Transmission: 5-speed (constant mesh) manual
- Frame type: Half-duplex cradle frame
- Fuel capacity: 7.2 litres
- Related: Suzuki TS50X

The Suzuki TS50ER was a 49 cc (3.0 cu in) single-cylinder motorcycle which sold during 1979–1983.

== Popularity ==
The TS50ER was extremely popular with 16-year-olds and young adults as its simplicity to ride and un-restricted potential power gave many the chance to explore the world of motorcycling. In many cases the TS50ER was so popular during its production era that it became the start of a lifetime of motorcycle enthusiasts.

The -ER model was the predecessor to the later Suzuki TS50X which ended production in 2000.

The TS models remain popular even today and a wide range of aftermarket parts and accessories are still available along with many original parts available in most stores some 27 years after production.
