= Miguel Angel Galluzzi =

Motorcycle designer

- Born: October 26, 1959 (age 66); Buenos Aires
- Education: Art Center College of Design
- Occupation: Motorcycle designer
- Employer: Piaggio Group
- Notable work: Ducati Monster Aprilia Dorsoduro; Moto Guzzi V7 Racer Moto Guzzi California 1400
- Title: Vice President of Design; Piaggio Advanced Design Center

The current state of motorcycle design:
It's clear that we are at the end of an era—think for a moment, all the other times that motorcycles suffered a radical transformation were after big wars. Only then, motorcycles changed and moved forward. Motorcycles were intended to be simple machines, not a crazy bunch of electronic devices to control something that nobody really needs. So, we are heading in a direction in which the motorcycle is going to be revolutionized.
— Miguel Galluzzi

On Design:
In my opinion a great designer is about 99% sweat and 1% talent! This means that a lot of discipline is required, even when you feel like you've hit the wall or reached the limit.
— Miguel Galluzzi (2011)

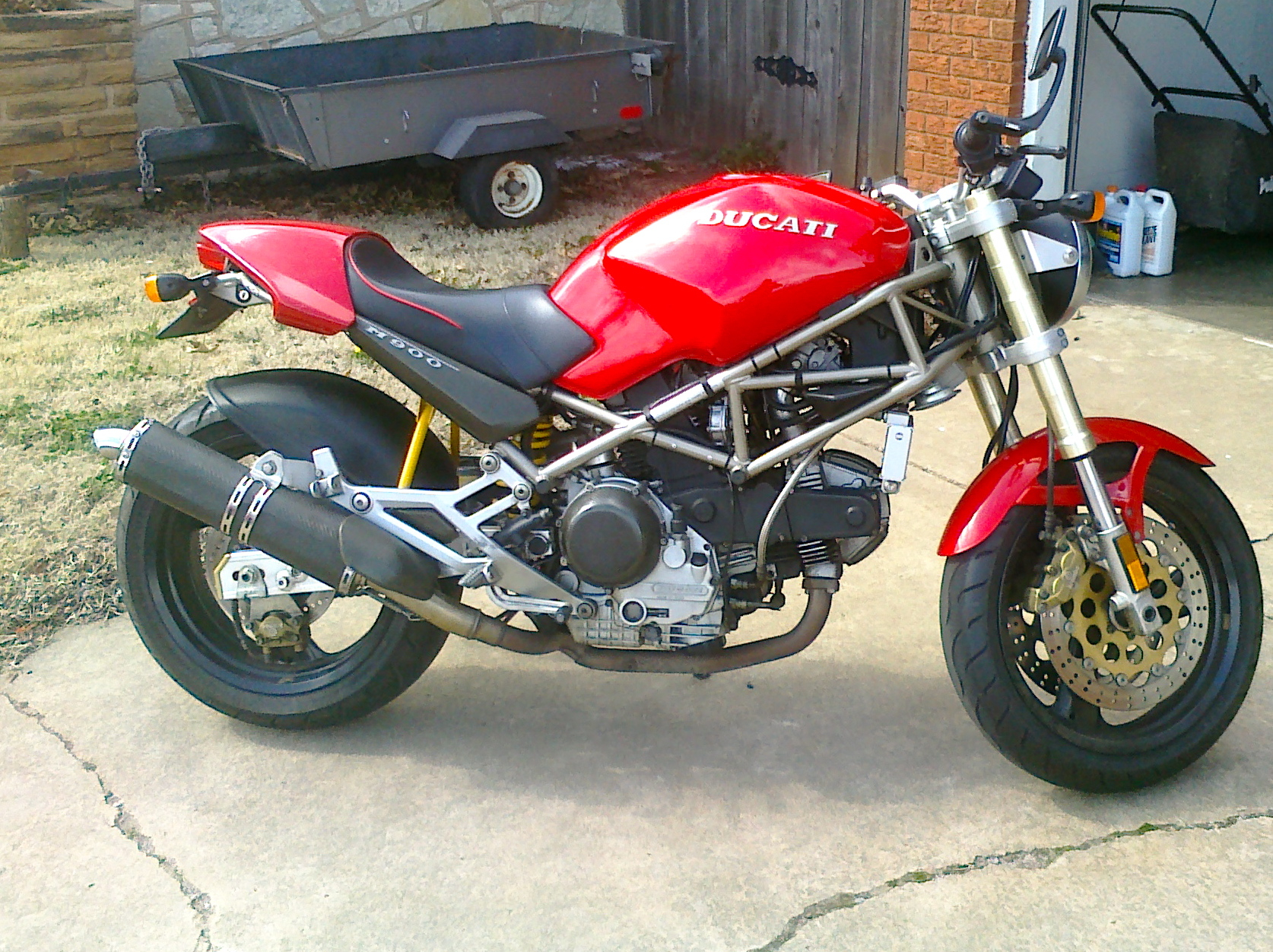
Ducati Monster M900

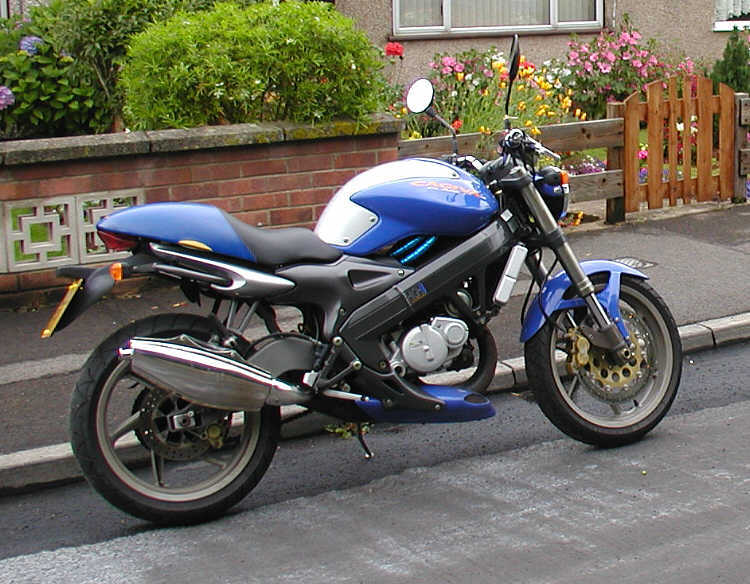
Cagiva Planet

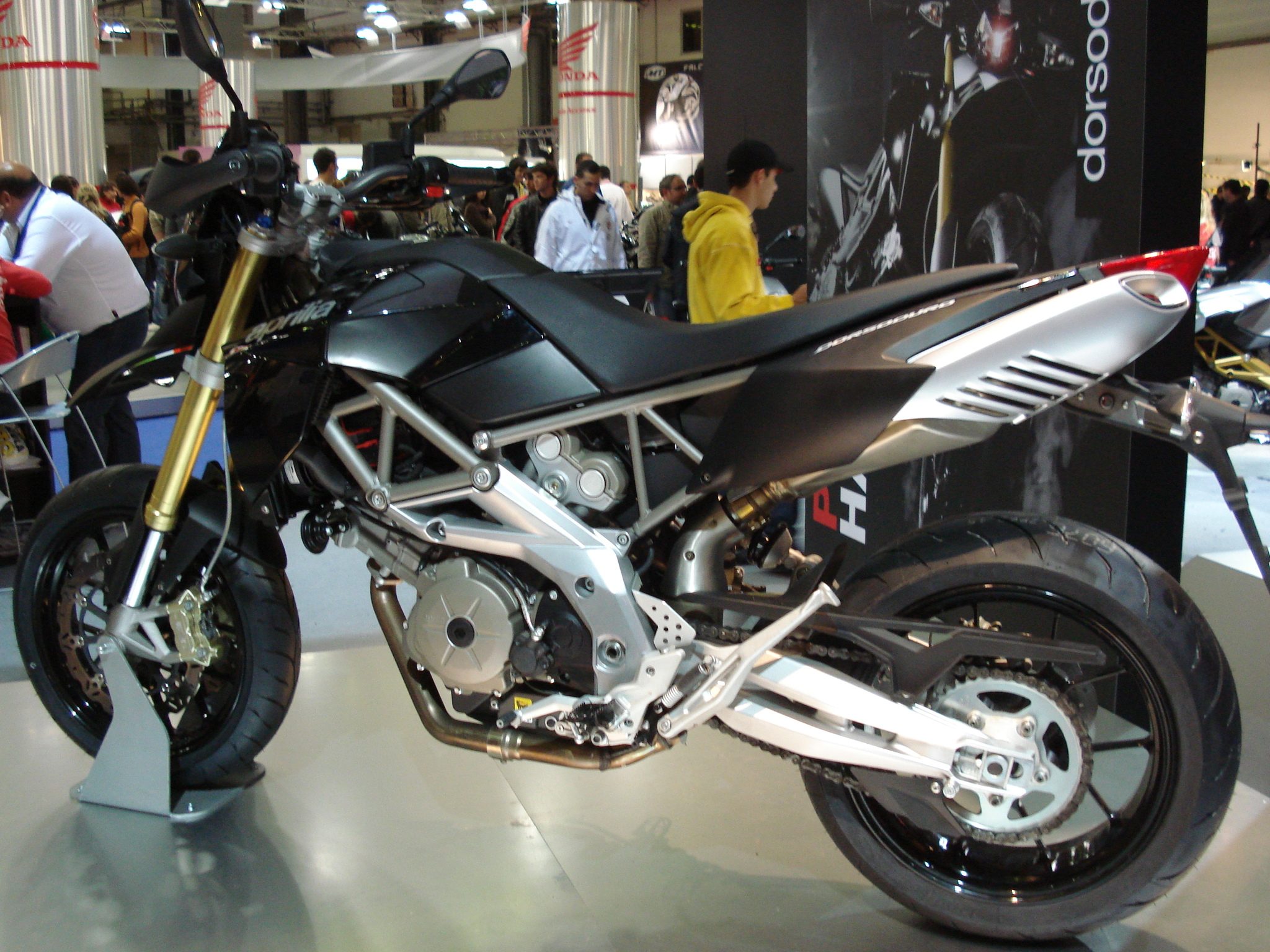
Aprilia Dorsoduro

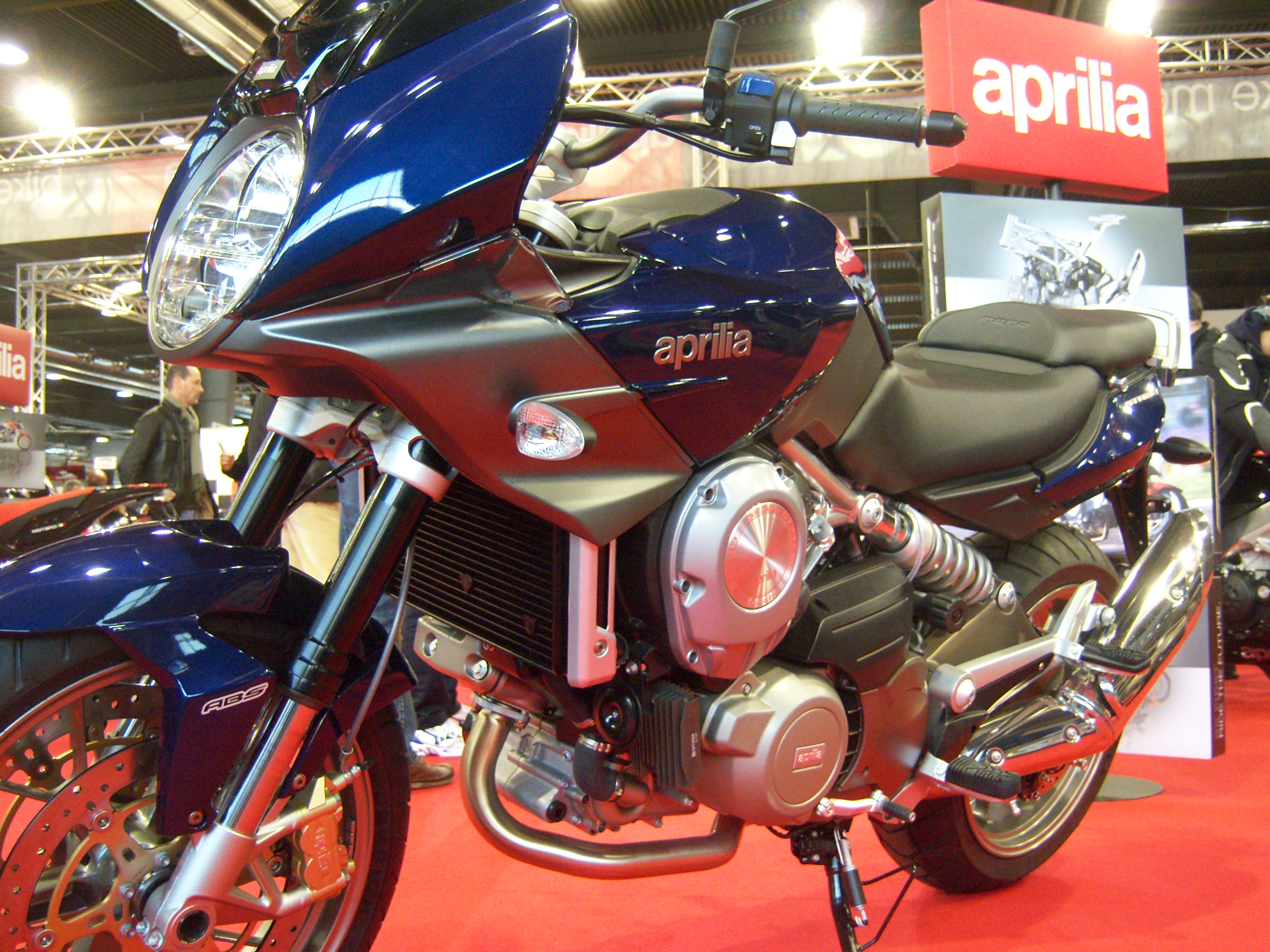
Aprilia Mana

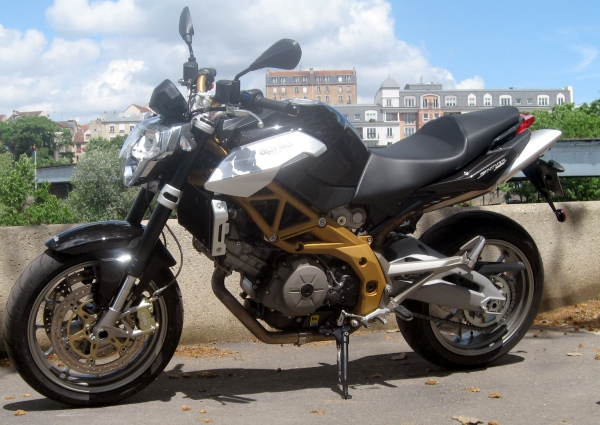
Aprilia Shiver

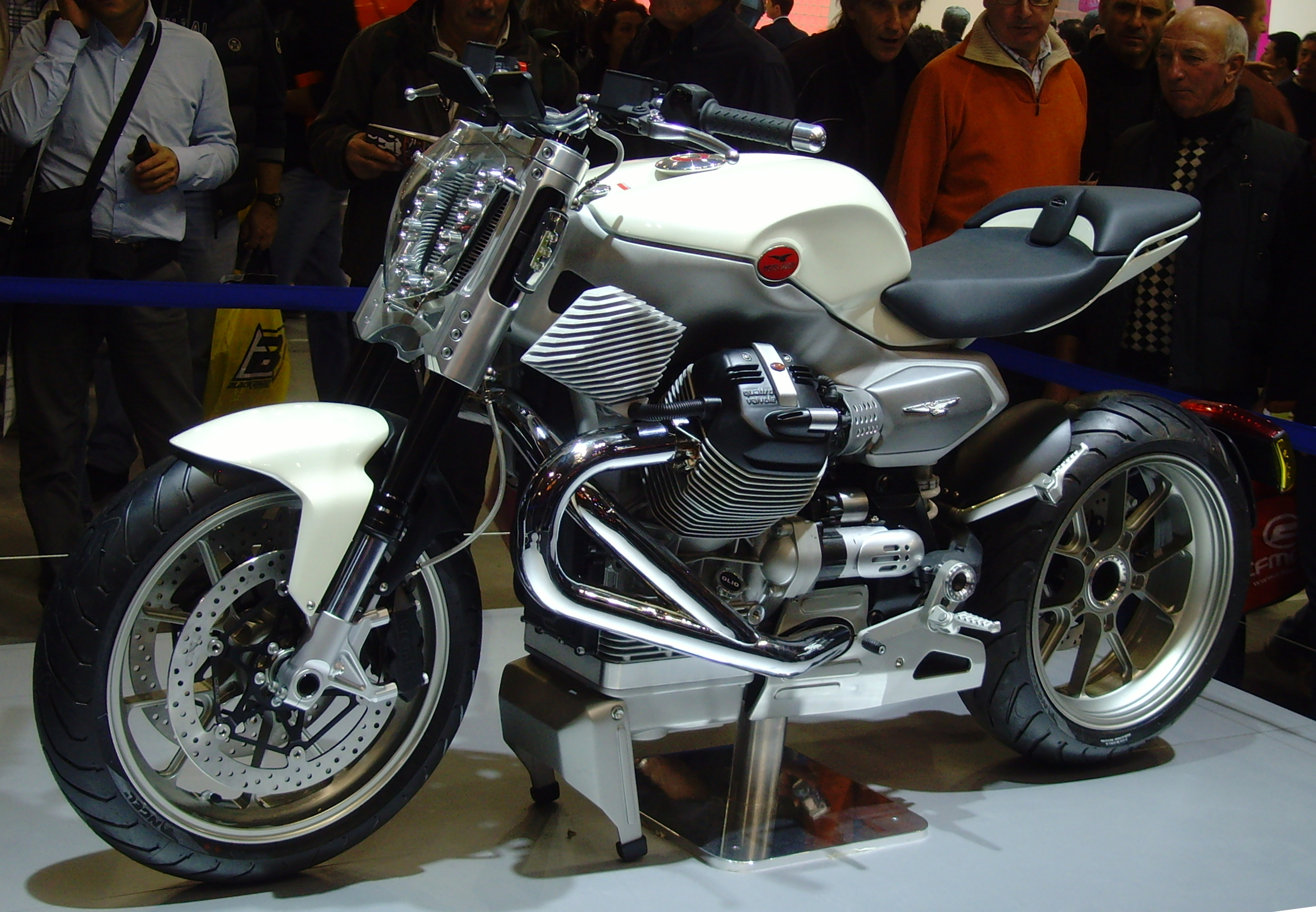
Moto Guzzi V12 Strada

Miguel Galluzzi (born October 26, 1959) is an industrial designer specializing in motorcycle design. Galluzzi currently heads Piaggio's Advanced Design Center (PADC) in Pasadena, California, where he manages the design of the Aprilia, Moto Guzzi, Derbi and Gilera motorcycle brands, working closely with the company's styling headquarters (Piaggio Group Style Center) in Italy as well as its research and development centers in China, India and Vietnam.

Widely known for having designed the Ducati Monster, Galluzzi has also designed the Aprilia Dorsoduro, RSV4, and Tuono — as well as the Moto Guzzi V7 Racer and California 1400.

Under Galluzzi's direction, Moto Guzzi received the Motorcycle Design Association Award in 2012, and in 2013, Visor Down named Galuzzi one of its Top Ten motorcycle designers.

== Background ==
Born in Buenos Aires, Argentina and raised in the US, Galluzzi is a third generation motorcyclist. His interest in motorcycling began in the early 1960s when he received a motorcycle as a birthday gift from his uncle, a 1959 Kreidler 50cc.

Galluzzi would later study at the Art Center College of Design in Pasadena, California, graduating in 1986 from the same Transportation Design program as BMW's noted designer, David Robb. Galluzzi first worked for Opel, and then for Honda's V-Car/Omega design studio in 1988, first in Offenbach, Germany and later in Milan.

== Design career ==
In 1989 Galluzzi began designing for Cagiva, then Ducati's parent company, in Varese, Italy. Staying at Cagiva for 17 years, Galuzzi became Styling Director at Aprilia in July 2006, eventually become Vice President of Design for Piaggio, Aprilia's parent company.

In 2012, Galluzzi relocated from Piaggio's headquarters in Pisa to Pasadena, California to lead the company's new Advanced Design Center (PADC), which manages other Piaggio centers in China, India, Italy and Vietnam — and works with the main Piaggio Group Style Center, run by Director Marco Lambri. Galluzzi chose the Pasadena location, "because of its proximity to centers of transportation thought," namely the Art Center College of Design, California Institute of Technology, and Jet Propulsion Laboratory.

Galluzzi said he is, "looking for the next form of mobility," five to fifteen years into the future, and he will be, "hiring young and creative and crazy people," at the new design center to do, "experiments that might offer a rethinking or a melding of recent mobility concepts". Piaggio and Galluzzi hope to bring a more cosmopolitan perspective than is possible working only in Italy, and branch out to such areas as electric vehicles that combine aspects of a motorcycle and a car, like the Renault Twizy and Audi Urban Concept. The Daily Telegraph's Kevin Ash said, with the Piaggo Group's total US sales, including Aprilia and Vespa, at only 10,000 units in 2011, the new center must also be aimed to bolster sales in that market.

== Motorcycle designs ==
At Cagiva and working for the Ducati brand, Galluzzi designed the 900 Supersport. The 1991 900 Supersport, offered in full- and half-fairing versions, became a classic, finding a balance between honoring the tradition set by the Super Sport models of the 1970s while looking modern and fresh.

Because Galluzzi is 6 ft 6 in (1.98 m) tall, many of his creations — which feature low seat heights and high foot pegs (e.g., the Monster) — are better suited to their target buyer than their designer.

=== Monster ===
Under direction of Ducati's technical engineer, Massimo Bordi, Galluzzi created a design widely noted for its rigorous minimalism, — drawing from his realization that "all you need (for a motorcycle) is a saddle, tank, engine, two wheels and handlebars". In ranking the Monster as 9th on his list of the 10 best motorcycle designs of all time, noted motorcycle designer, Glynn Kerr, described the design as having "all it needs and no more."

For its 1998 exhibition, The Art of the Motorcycle, the New York Guggenheim Museum featured 114 motorcycles, including the Monster. In the exhibition catalog, the museum said: "flying in the face of every contemporary motorcycle design rubric from Tokyo to Munich, Galluzzi recreated stripped-bare suburban specials in a production motorcycle. The result, a brilliant piece of pop-culture interpretation, was the M900, nicknamed "the Monster."

Numerous sources credit the Monster with popularizing the naked bike niche." With Monsters sales eventually accounting for two-thirds or more of Ducati's output, the bike "became the company's best selling and most profitable model line," essential to the company's success.

=== Later motorcycles ===
After the Monster, Galluzzi designed the 1997 Ducati ST2, which Industrial designer Andrew Serbinski considered ill-proportioned in its first generation, with its large fuel tank."

Galluzzi subsequently designed the Cagiva Planet of 1998, a variant of the Mito, followed by the 1999 Cagiva Raptor, which used a Suzuki engine shared by the TL1000.

After leaving Cagiva and joining Aprilia in 2006, Galluzzi designed the 2007 Aprilia Dorsoduro, 2008 RSV4, 2008 Mana, SL 750 Shiver of 2009, and several Husqvarna models. He also contributed to the Vespa/Piaggio 1+1 concept vehicle.

Many of the Ducatis Galluzzi originally styled were later revised and updated by Pierre Terblanche, including the ST series and the Monster 696 update of 2008. Terblanche later joined Galluzzi at Aprilia, where they have worked together on several new and revised models for Aprilia subsidiary Moto Guzzi. The two collaborated on the Moto Guzzi V12 series, with Le Mans, Strada, and X variants, displayed at EICMA in 2009. Galluzzi described the challenge he and Terblanche faced revising the Moto Guzzi image by saying, "The Guzzi crowd is extremely conservative, but if we only concentrate on those, we are going to lose eventually. So these bikes are looking into the future." This is similar to the balance sought with earlier Ducati designs, but, "the advantage Guzzi has versus Ducati is that Ducati makes sportsbikes, Guzzi can do anything it wants because they've been doing it a long time and on all sorts of bikes."

In 2012 Moto Guzzi introduced Galuzzi's "Art Nouveau style" California 1400 which breaks with traditional Harley-Davidsion-inspired cruiser style of the previous California. The new 1400 is more radically modern, similar to the latest power cruisers, the Harley-Davidsion V-Rod and Ducati Diavel. The bike's new1,400 cc (85 cu in) engine expands Moto Guzzi's engine range, on top of the previous 1,200 cc (73 cu in) and 750 cc (46 cu in) displacement powerplants.
