= Cagiva Raptor =

The Cagiva Raptor is a motorcycle produced by the Italian motorcycle manufacturer Cagiva.

Built in 1000 and 650 cm^{3} versions, it was designed by Miguel Angel Galluzzi, already the designer of the first generation Ducati Monster. The Raptor was conceived while Cagiva was still the owner of the Ducati brand and was originally called the M2 - (Monster 2) as an intended second generation of that motorcycle. Following the 1998 sale of Ducati, Cagiva retained the design but lost access to Ducati tubular frame manufacturing or engines. Cagiva contracted with Telca, part of the MV Agusta family of companies for the production of the frames, and with Suzuki to provide V-twin engines similar to the dimensions and specifications of the Ducati engines originally intended for the design. The manufacturer's plate retains the M2 name and shows MV Agusta as the manufacturer.

The later Raptor 125 is a mostly unrelated two stroke model based on the Cagiva Mito sharing styling cues with the larger models.

== Raptor 1000 ==
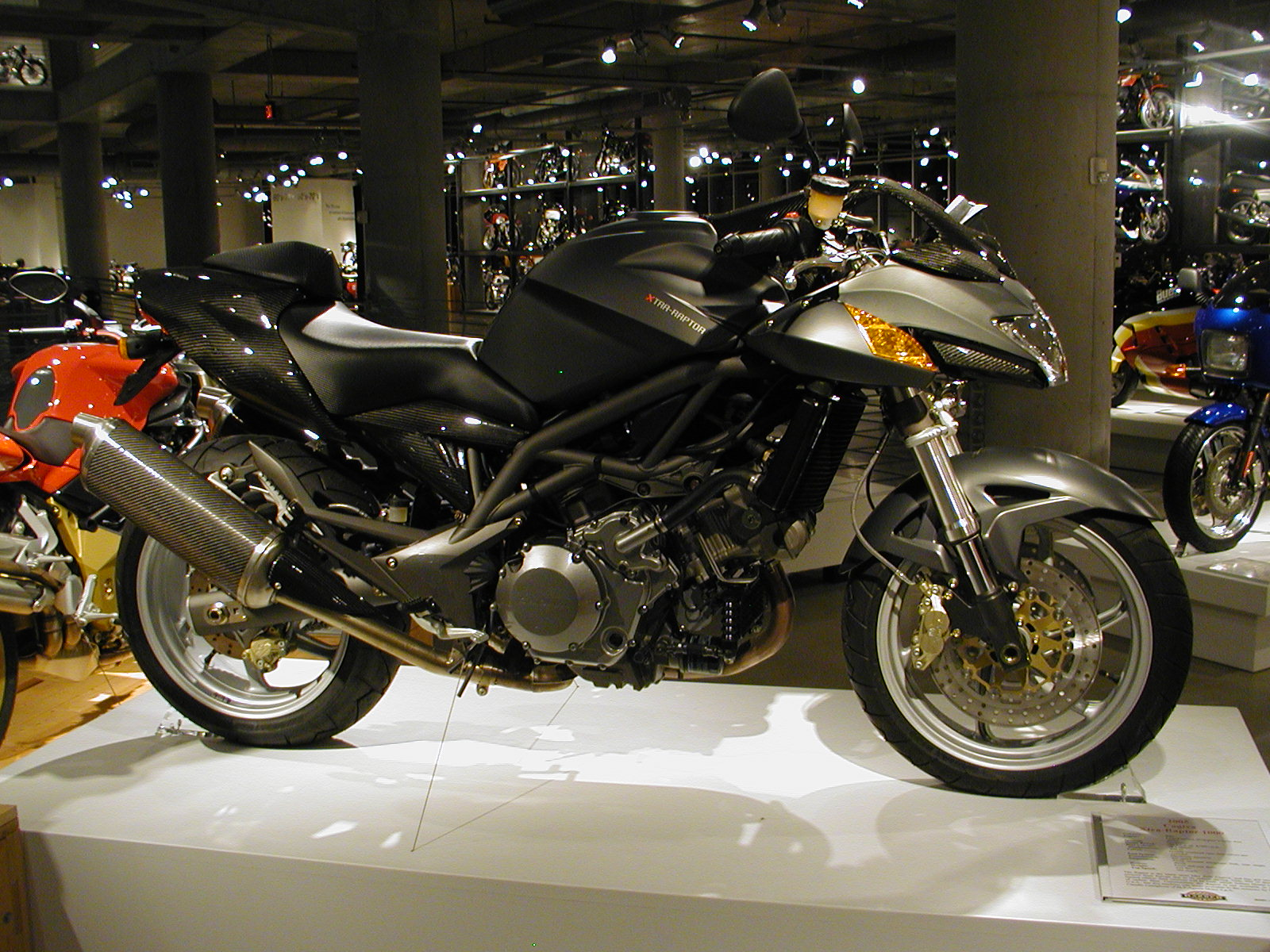
Cagiva Xtra Raptor 1000

The largest displacement version first entered production in 2000 and was discontinued in 2006. It was produced in a single series but in two versions, a standard naked and a sport V-Raptor. The special edition Xtra-Raptor, an upgraded version of the V-Raptor was released in 2001 with identical dimensions but with carbon fairing parts and fully adjustable suspension. In 2004, a prototype called the X3 Raptor was presented but never entered production.

They were equipped with an engine from the Suzuki TL1000S but remapped to slightly increase torque at the expense of power. The engine produces 106 horsepower (79 kW) 82 kW (110 hp) while the motorcycle has a dry weight of 434 pounds (197 kg). The braking system consisted of two disc brakes at the front and a single disc at the rear. 1000 and 650cc models shared a 43mm upside-down fork supplied by Marzocchi and a monoshock at the rear.

Unofficial sources say that approximately 300 V-Raptor 1000s and approximately 600 Xtra-Raptors were produced. The Xtra, produced in a limited series, has a plate bearing numbering intended to range from 1/999 to 999/999.

== Raptor 650 ==
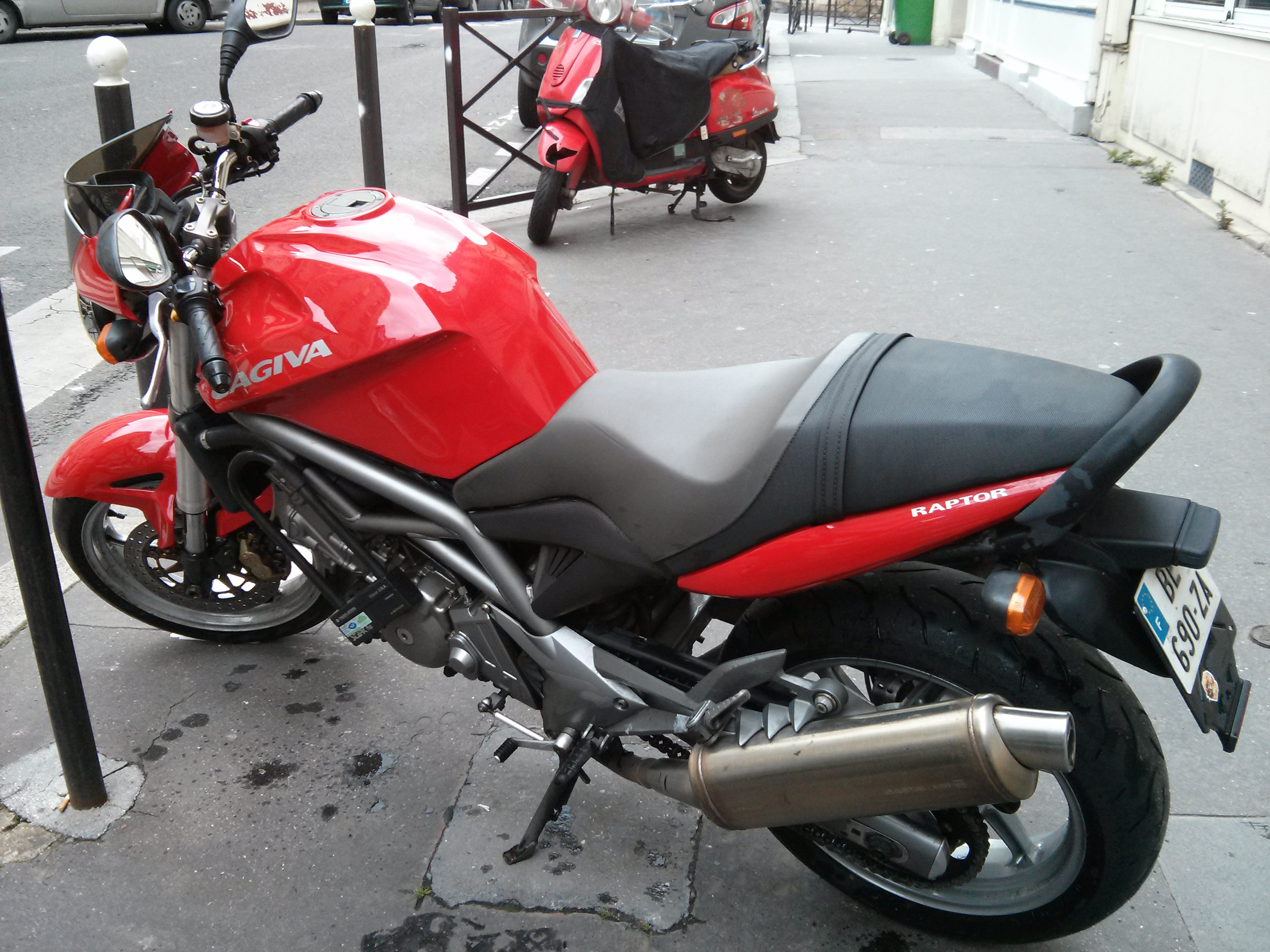
Cagiva Raptor 650

The Raptor 650 entered production with a first series from 2001 to 2004, mounting a 69-horsepower (51 kW)carbureted engine from the Suzuki SV650, with tuning differences to account for the freer flowing dual exhaust on the Raptor.

The second series starting from 2005 and produced until 2007 was equipped with the similarly updated SV650 engine featuring the SDTV (Double Throttle Valve) digital injection system and the PAIR (Pulsed secondary air injection) system, again revised in its fuel delivery at the CRC center in San Marino. The oil cooler from the 1,000cc version was adapted, and the rectifier was moved from under the seat which caused overheating in the first series, to the side panel with new vents for cooling. The fuel tank was also revised to accommodate the new fuel injection system, reducing its capacity. Other changes to the updated model include raised triangle linkages on the rear monoshock, a windshield derived from the X3 concept bike with revised mounting, smooth side frame and panels no longer textured to emulate carbon fiber, painted underseat trim, and revised pointed mirrors rather than round.

== Raptor 125 ==
Beginning production in 2003 this motorcycle is a derivation of the Cagiva Planet, both of which are based on the Cagiva Mito. A naked model intended for more urban use, it has a different riding position and different calibrations for the braking system and shock absorbers which make it more comfortable and agile.

The 125 has "gold series" adjustable braking system from Brembo, also fitted to the first generation Ducati Monster. Upside-down 40mm front forks are supplied by Marzocchi.

New electronic engine management (ECS) in 2007 allowed for Euro 3 homologation.
