= Suzuki TS50X =

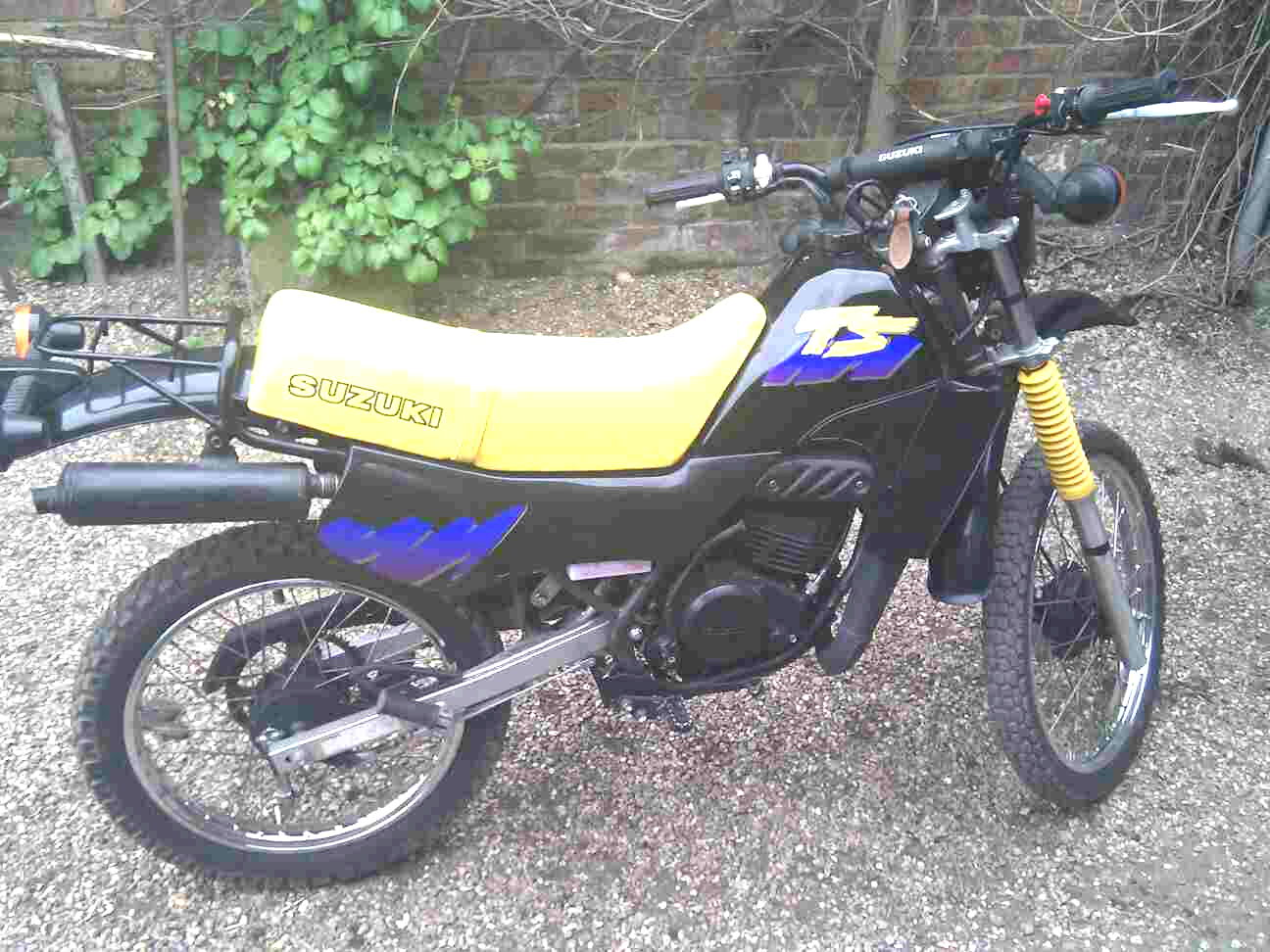
- Suzuki TS50XKR 2002
- Manufacturer: Suzuki
- Production: 1984–2000
- Predecessor: Suzuki TS50ER
- Class: Trail
- Engine: 500 cc (31 cu in) air-cooled two stroke, single
- Bore / stroke: 41 mm × 37.8 mm (1.61 in × 1.49 in)
- Compression ratio: 6.2:1
- Top speed: 168km/h (gps)
- Power: 43bhp
- Ignition type: Capacitor discharge electronic ignition, Kick start
- Transmission: 6-speed constant mesh; manual, chain final drive
- Frame type: Duplex cradle
- Suspension: Front: telescopic coil sprung, hydraulically damped Rear: Suzuki "full-floater", swingarm
- Brakes: Drum, front and rear
- Tyres: Front: 2.50 x 21, Rear: 3.00 x 18
- Wheelbase: 1.340 m (4 ft 4.8 in)
- Dimensions: L: 2.140 m (7 ft 0.3 in); W: 0.745 m (2 ft 5.3 in); H: 1.155 m (3 ft 9.5 in)
- Weight: 97 kg (214 lb) (dry)
- Fuel capacity: 7 L (1.5 imp gal; 1.8 US gal)
- Oil capacity: 1.2 L (0.26 imp gal; 0.32 US gal)
- Related: Suzuki TS50ER

The Suzuki TS50X is an air-cooled, 500 cc (31 cu in)(50 in the name being short for 500) single-cylinder, two-stroke engined, trail style motorcycle manufactured by Suzuki from 1984 to 2000. It had a five-speed manual gearbox and complied with the United Kingdom requirements of the time to be classified as a moped. Electrics were 12 volt and capacitor discharge electronic ignition was used.The machine used Suzuki's own CCI oil pump delivery system, avoiding the need to pre-mix two-stroke engine oil.

The duplex cradle type frame, is made of welded tubular steel with a steel box-section swingarm. Front suspension is conventional coil-sprung telescopic, but the rear has Suzuki's "full-floater" type where the suspension is connected to the frame by a linkage, which allows spring rates to increase in response to wheel travel.
