= Piatti scooter =

Piatti
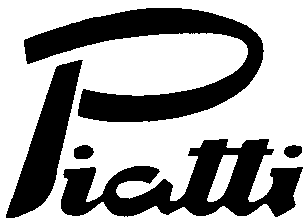
- Manufacturer: Cyclemaster, Tudor Works, Chertsey, Weybridge, Surrey.
- Production: 1956-57
- Engine: Horizontal 124 cc (7.6 cu in) 2-stroke, air-cooled, single with Silentbloc rubber mountings
- Bore / stroke: 51 mm (2.0 in) x 61 mm (2.4 in)
- Compression ratio: 7.2:1
- Top speed: 38 mph (61 km/h)
- Ignition type: Wico-Pacy flywheel magneto
- Transmission: 3-speed twist-grip operated with single-plate, engine-speed wet clutch
- Frame type: Step-over monocoque, sheet-steel pressings welded together
- Suspension: Front: coil spring pivoted arm Rear: coil spring on final drive chain housing with three adjustments for load
- Brakes: Front: 4.75 in (121 mm) drum Rear: 4.75 in (121 mm) drum
- Tyres: 3.50 in (89 mm) x 7 in (180 mm)
- Seat height: Adjustable, between 28 in (710 mm) and 32.5 in (830 mm)
- Weight: 196 lb (89 kg) (wet)
- Fuel capacity: 1.5 imp gal (6.8 L; 1.8 US gal)

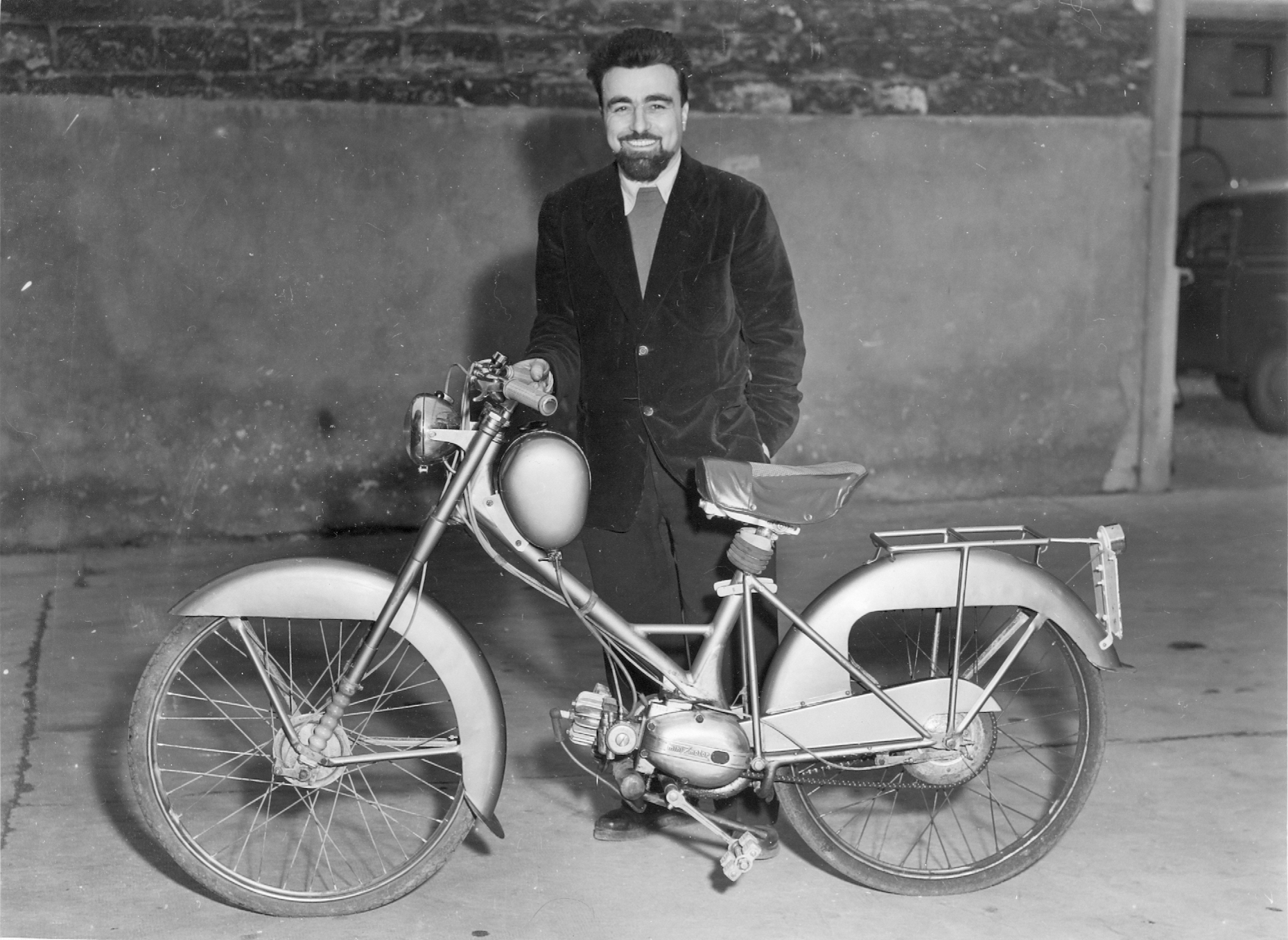
Vincent Piatti with his 50cc minimotor

Despite its Italian name, the Piatti scooter was of Belgian (and later, British) manufacture, being originally produced in 1954 in Belgium by D'Ieteren. Its name came from its italian designer, Vincenzo Piatti.

In 1956, production also commenced at the Cyclemaster works at Byfleet in Surrey, England.

However, the increasing availability of affordable small cars in Europe affected sales of the Piatti (and other scooters) and production eventually ceased. According to Erwin Tragatsch in a brief entry on the Piatti scooter in his Illustrated Encyclopedia of Motorcycles, Cyclemaster "failed to find many customers for this product", and manufactured only a small number before British production terminated.

The Piatti scooter has the dubious distinction of being, in the words of Bob Currie (author of Great British Motorcycles of the Sixties), "the worst scooter ever perpetrated."
