= Parts bin special =

A parts bin special is a vehicle constructed from all or mostly pre-designed parts. Often they are made to rapidly take advantage of an emerging market. Vehicles such as the Triumph Spitfire based largely on Triumph Herald parts, was produced, by Triumph, to take advantage of the early 1960s desire for small sports cars. The Ducati 350XL was produced by Ducati to quickly take advantage of a tax break. The Moto Guzzi 1000S is another example.

Others have been produced by third parties using parts acquired from 3rd parties, while some have been produced for racing and promotional purposes.
