= Andrew Serbinski =

- Education: BID
- Alma mater: Pratt Institute
- Occupation: Industrial designer
- Employer: Machineart
- Title: President, Principal Designer

Machineart, Inc.
- Company type: Private
- Industry: Product development Industrial design Interaction design
- Founded: 1988
- Headquarters: Frenchtown, NJ, USA
- Key people: Andrew Serbinski, President; Daniel Howell, Design Director; Rich Wyant, Design Director
- Website: www.machineart.com/

Andrew Serbinski is the president and principal designer of Machineart.

Serbinski lived in Tokyo, Japan from 1973 to 1975 designing the first convenience plain paper photocopiers for Ricoh and its export customers in the United States and Europe. This led him to establish Machineart Industrial Design in 1988 to provide design services for Japanese and American companies.

In 1988 he founded Machineart, an industrial design consultancy based in Frenchtown, New Jersey. The company designs products, recreational vehicles, packaging, graphics, and user interfaces. In 2005, The Museum of Modern Art showcased the Machineart-designed Leardal Inflate-a-shield as part of their exhibit "SAFE, Design takes on risk." Machineart Moto was formed in 2007 to market Machineart designed specialized parts for BMW motorcycles.

A lifelong interest in motorcycles led him to design the MK9, MF3, and eCycle eC Series concept motorcycles.

Serbinski holds a BID from Pratt Institute.
