= Janoir =

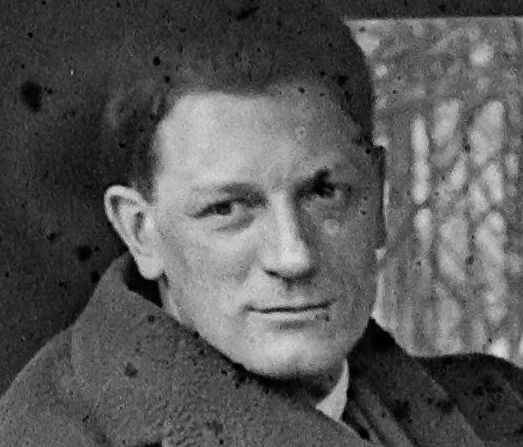
Louis Janoir (1883–1969) in 1924.

The Janoir was a French motorcycle manufactured from 1919 until 1922 in Saint-Ouen. The few that were made were 965 cc flat twins.

Born in Lugny (Saone-et-Loire) in 1883, Louis Janoir gets his plane pilot's licence in 1911. This engineer joins another student from the same school, Louis Bechereau - designer of Deperdussin airplanes - and took part in numerous air raids and competitions. In 1916, he started the company Janoir Aviation based in Saint-Ouen. During the First World War, the Janoir factory devoted itself to repair then later to building SPAD fighter planes, but like many aircraft companies the end of the war meant an immediate rethink about redeploying their engineering skills. Cars, cyclecars and motorcycles were ideal areas, and Janoir Aviation joined others such as Sopwith Aviation Company, Martinsyde, and Louis Blériot in attempting to break into this growing market.

== Janoir Motorcycle ==
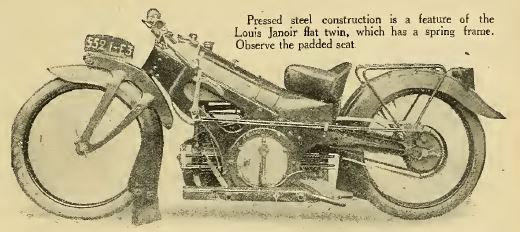
1920 Janoir Motorcycle

Louis Janoir launched his motorcycle at the Paris Salon show in 1919. The frame was the usual tubular steel, but with front and rear suspension and rear chain drive. It had two equal seats allowing a pillion passenger to ride in some comfort. The engine was an in-line flat twin which was unusual in that the engine, cylinders and 3-speed gearbox were housed in a single aluminium casting, with steel cylinder liners and detachable cylinder heads. The engine and gearbox used roller bearing and lubrication was by a gear driven pump.

By the 1920 Paris Salon show it had been redesigned to have an all pressed steel frame (apart from the luggage carrier), with pressed steel also used for the revised front forks and the rear swinging arm - both now using half-leaf spring for the suspension. Other features include dual rear drum brakes and quickly detachable wheels needing no tools, so that the rear chain drive and drum brakes do not have to be disturbed when the wheel is removed. Further details were given of the in-line twin cylinder engine of 965cc cylinder capacity (85mmx85mm). This engine had overhead valves and was rated at 8 hp but produced 11 bhp at 2000rpm, and 16 bhp at 3200rpm.

== Other products ==
Janoir also advertised that they made sidecars, and vehicle bodywork (carrosserie), an example being the Peugeot electric vans in 1926 which were bodied by Janoir. Janoir also built bespoke coachwork for cars, and examples surviving or featured in photos include Delahaye c1923, Lorraine-Dietrich c1924, Delage cars c1925 to 1927.
