= Massimo Tamburini =

Italian motorcycle designer (1943–2014)

- Born: November 28, 1943; Rimini, Italy
- Died: April 6, 2014 (aged 70); San Marino
- Occupation: Motorcycle designer
- Employer(s): Bimota, Cagiva, Ducati, MV Agusta
- Notable work: Ducati 916, MV Agusta F4
- Children: Morena, Andrea, Simona
- Website: http://www.massimotamburini.com/en/

Massimo Tamburini (November 28, 1943 – April 6, 2014) was an Italian motorcycle designer for Cagiva, Ducati, and MV Agusta, and one of the founders of Bimota. Tamburini's designs are iconic in their field, with one critic calling him the "Michelangelo of motorbike design". His Ducati 916 and MV Agusta F4 were included in the Guggenheim Museum's The Art of the Motorcycle exhibit of 1998–1999.

He lived and worked in San Marino at the Cagiva Research Center (Italian: Centro Ricerche Cagiva, CRC), a subsidiary of Cagiva now MV Agusta, from which he retired on December 31, 2008.

== Early life ==
Tamburini was born on November 28, 1943, in Rimini, where his family were farmers. Although he aspired to attend university, for financial reasons he instead attended the Istituto Tecnico Industriale di Rimini, a technical school in Rimini. According to his biography published by the City of Rimini, he did not finish his technical education for health reasons, and began working at age 18 on heating ductwork.

== Career ==
Tamburini said, "I have always had a huge passion for motorcycles—my mother used to complain about it when I was a little boy, calling it my obsession! I have never had any desire to design anything else." His exposure to the motorcycle industry began when he attended the world championship race at Monza in 1961. Captivated by the sound of the MV Agusta's four stroke engine ridden by Provini, and entirely self-taught in design, Tamburini eventually devoted his life to the making of motorcycles.

While Tamburini owned a heating business in his home town of Rimini, he was becoming known for his race tuning, improving motorcycles' power and handling, as well as making them lighter. Rimini was a motorcycling enthusiast's town, being near a Benelli motorcycle factory, and the site of many road races following World War II. The MV Agusta 600 four was Tamburini's particular specialty, for which he was known "throughout Italy", according to Mick Walker, who said, "the transformation of what had been an ugly and slow touring bike into a sleek and fast sportster was truly sensational."

Tamburini created his first motorcycle design in 1971, customizing an MV Agusta 750 Sport by welding the frame himself.

In 1973, Tamburini, Valerio Bianchi, and Giuseppe Morri founded Bimota. Previously the three had been designing and fabricating air conditioning ducts. The company name was a portmanteau of the first letters of their last names, Bi, Mo, Ta. Speaking of motorcycles of the future, Tamburini summed up his design philosophy by saying, "The ideal one would be a 750 with the power of a 1000 and the weight of a 500. You don't need a huge amount of power on a road bike, but it's important to have light weight as well." Tamburini criticized the Ducati ST2, saying, "I think the ST2 is an attempt to follow a Japanese concept, and this shouldn't be done by Italians."

After 11 years at Bimota, Tamburini left and for a short time joined Roberto Gallina's 500 cc Grand Prix world championship team. Then, in February 1985, he joined Claudio Castiglioni's Cagiva Group. Cagiva had acquired Ducati that year, and Tamburini worked designing both Ducati and Cagiva brand motorcycles.

In 1985, Bimota was under "controlled administration", or fallimento, similar to US Chapter 11 reorganization and Tamburini had officially left the company, Giuseppe Morri having purchased Tamburini's Bimota stock. Tamburini's successor as chief designer at Bimota was Federico Martini. Even though Tamburini was in his new position as head of Cagiva's design studio, he continued work back at Bimota, in spite of the falling out with his partners that led to his departure, working on the Bimota DB1 prototype, a bike that used the engine of the Ducati Pantah 750, which was to be presented at EICMA, the Milan motorcycle show. Martini was responsible for the engineering of the DB1, Tamburini, as a consultant to Cagiva, handled the styling.

The first Ducati he designed was the Paso 750, a bike that helped move fully enclosing bodywork into the mainstream.

=== Ducati 916 ===
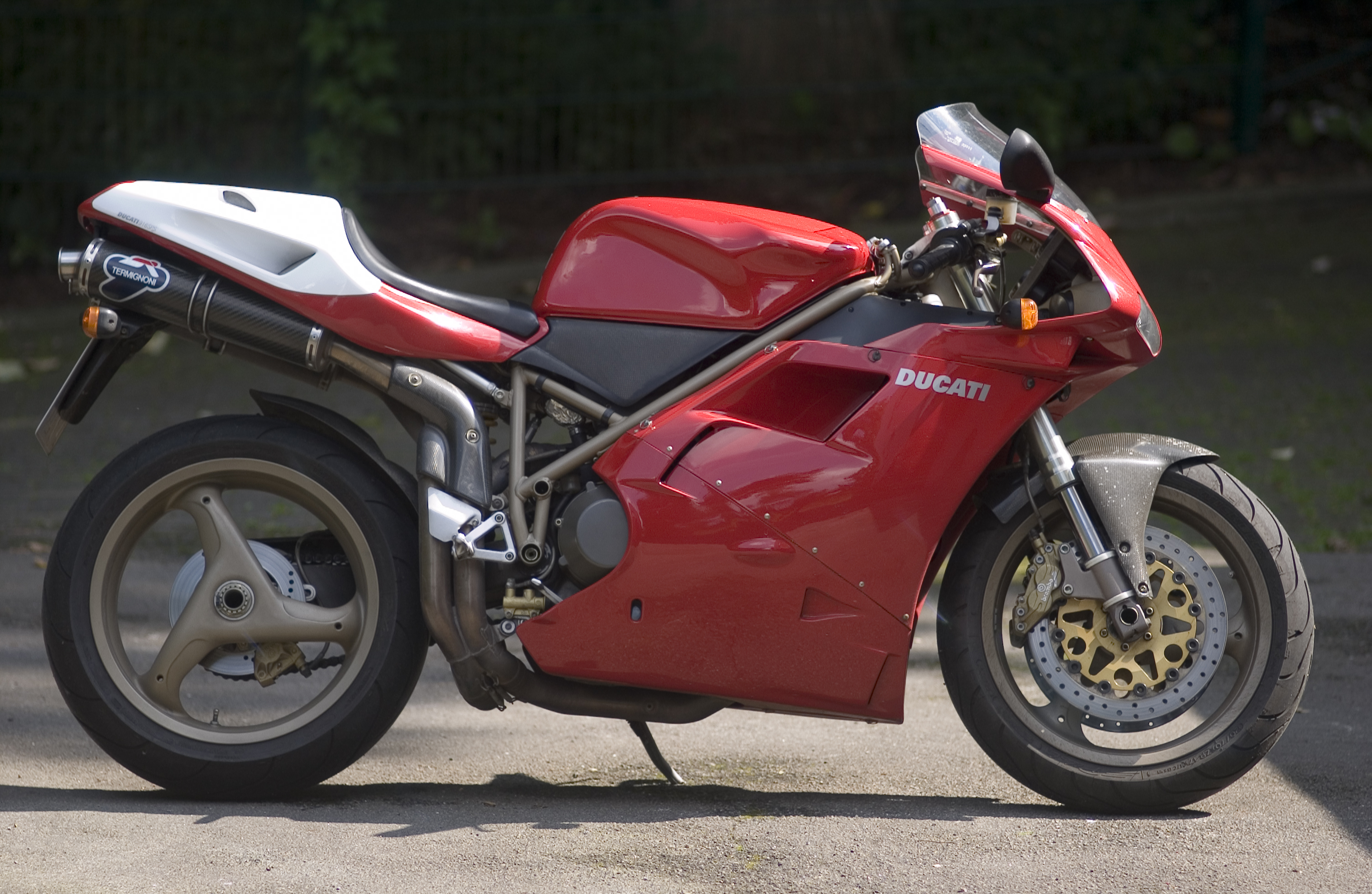
Ducati 916

Tamburini later designed the now classic Ducati 916. South African motorcycle designer Pierre Terblanche and Tamburini were working side by side at the Cagiva Research Center (CRC) on new designs, Tamburini on the 916 and Terblanche on the Ducati Supermono. Terblanche's Supermono, which shared several visual cues with the Tamburini's 916, was shown to the public before the 916, leaving the impression that Tamburini was influenced by Terblanche. In fact, the influence was the other way around, with Terblanche incorporating ideas that Tamburini shared with him in the design studio from his 916 design. Journalist Kevin Ash said that the roots of the 916's styling were found elsewhere, outside Ducati and CRC. Ash said that the timing of the public debut of Honda's advanced oval-piston, 32-valve V4 engine Grand Prix racing bike, the NR750, in August 1991, indicates that NR750 influenced the final shape of the 916, though Tamburini, Terblanche and others at Ducati would not confirm this, Tamburini only saying that he was influenced by "existing designs." Ash said that Tamburini showed a better understanding of visual weight than the NR750's designers, and the 916 design, "moved it forward, personalized, and Ducati-fied it, in particular the blend of sharp edges and sweeping curves, which, like most innovation, broke existing rules."

=== After Ducati ===
When the Castiglioni brothers sold Ducati in 1996, Tamburini stayed with Cagiva, where he designed the MV Agusta F4 to great acclaim. While designing the F4 c. 1996, he was diagnosed with prostate cancer; his son Andrea said he wanted to survive the illness long enough to finish the F4 and save MV Agusta. His final motorcycle was the MV Agusta F3 675. Cycle World's Brian Catterson spotted Tamburini riding his creation, the F4, in the hills of Tuscany during the 2001 Motorgiro d'Italia. Tamburini retired from Cagiva in December, 2008.

== Illness and death ==
Tamburini was diagnosed with lung cancer in November 2013 and underwent chemotherapy near his residence in San Marino. His health continued to decline, and he died on April 6, 2014, at age 70. Around 500 people attended his funeral in Rimini on April 9, including the mayor in his official capacity.

== Motorcycle designs ==
- Bimota Tesi 1D
- Bimota KB2
- Bimota DB1
- Ducati Paso
- Ducati 916
  - Ducati 748
  - Ducati 996
  - Ducati 998
- Cagiva Aletta Oro
- Cagiva Freccia
- Cagiva Mito
- Moto Morini Dart
- F4 750 Serie Oro
- F4 750 S
- F4 750 Senna
- F4 750
- F4 750
- F4 750 750 SPR and SR
- F4 1000
- F4 AGO
- F4 Tamburini
- F4 Senna
- F4 Veltro
- F4 750 R 312
- F4 750 CC
- MV Agusta Brutale
- Tamburini Corse T12 Massimo (Released posthumously) project realized by his son Andrea Tamburini

== Awards ==
Tamburini was awarded the Sigismondo d'Oro in 2012, the highest award of the city of Rimini.
