= Ducati ST series =

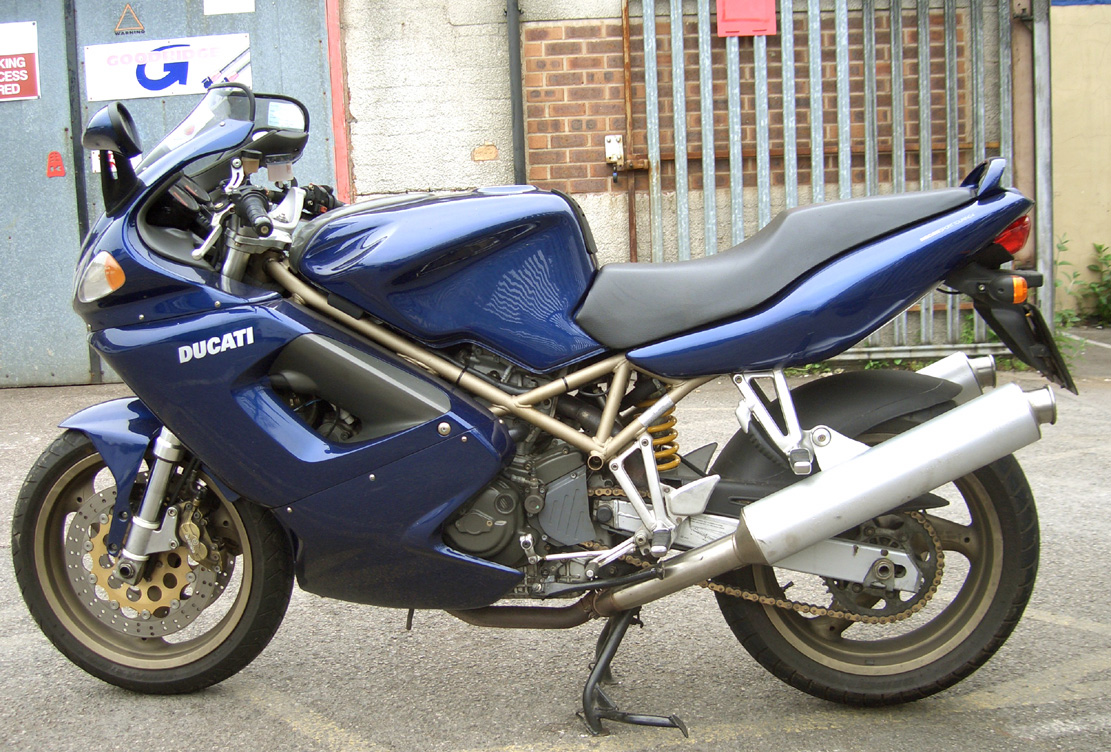
- Manufacturer: Ducati
- Production: 1997-2007
- Predecessor: 907 Paso
- Class: Sport touring
- Engine: 90° V-twin, 2, 3 or 4 desmodromic valves per cylinder, liquid cooled
- Transmission: 6 speed gearbox with dry clutch (or later, a wet clutch)
- Wheelbase: 1,430 mm (56 in)
- Dimensions: L: 2,070 mm (81 in)
- Fuel capacity: 21 L (4.6 imp gal; 5.5 US gal)

The Ducati ST series is a set of Italian sport touring motorcycles manufactured by Ducati from 1997 through 2007. In order of release, the series comprised five distinct models: the ST2, ST4, ST4S, ST3, and ST3S. Intended to compete with other sport-tourers such as the Honda VFR, the ST Ducatis had a full fairing, a large dual seat and a relaxed riding position for both rider and pillion. The ST bikes had a centre-stand, and could be fitted with optional matching luggage.

All five bikes in the ST series were outwardly similar, sharing the same frame, bodywork and cycle parts, but each model had a different engine, albeit that all were liquid-cooled desmodromic V-twins. The numeral after "ST" (2, 3 or 4) indicates the number of valves per cylinder. In the Ducati tradition, the frame was a tubular steel trellis item, and the conventional suspension comprised USD forks and a rear monoshock. In 2004, the ST series had a facelift, getting an updated nose, a new headlight, ABS and a weight reduction.

== Design and development ==
This Ducati ST series first appeared in 1997 in Europe, with shipments to the United States in 1998. The first in the series, the ST2, had a 944 cc Desmodue two-valve motor. The ST2 was a replacement for the Paso, and represented a more focussed entry by Ducati into the burgeoning sport-touring market.

In 1999 Ducati added to the range the ST4 model, which used the four-valve Desmoquattro motor derived from the Ducati 916, but retuned for the ST bike. After the release of the 996 Desmoquattro superbike in 1999, Ducati began to phase out production of the 916 engine, which was last used in the 2003 ST4.

In late 2001, the ST4s model with the 996 Desmoquattro engine was added to the ST range. The ST4s benefited from suspension enhancements, and became available in 2002.

In 2004, the ST2 and ST4 were deleted, both being replaced by the ST3, with the new three-valve Desmotre engine of 992 cc displacement. The Desmotre required less maintenance than the ST4s, which was notoriously expensive to maintain. Nevertheless, the ST4s remained as the top model in the range.

In 2006, the ST4s production was discontinued in favour of an ST3s variant which inherited the enhanced ST4s suspension components, but which kept the ST3 Desmotre motor unchanged. Reasons given for the ST4s' demise were that the 996 engine would not pass the stringent Euro-3 emissions standard, whereas the ST3 motor could pass the emissions tests. In 2004 and 2005, Ducati added a wet clutch to many models, including the ST series in 2005. This reduced the force necessary to engage the clutch.

Both "S" bikes, the ST4s and ST3s, could be equipped with ABS from 2003. In 2004, an upgrade to the ST line brought a modified nose fairing and dashboard, adjustable ergonomics, a trip computer, four-way (hazard) flashers, digital speedometer, a dashboard-controlled adjustable headlight, a new seat design, Euro-2 catalytic exhaust, and a simplified CAN-bus wiring setup. Dry weight was reduced by 11 kg (24 lb) due to the lighter wiring harness and simpler support structure for the nose of the bike.

The ST series finished in 2008, the ST3 and ST3s models having only sold 1,011 total worldwide units in 2007. Following these poor sales, Ducati chose to refocus the brand onto sport bikes such as the Panigale. In its factory plan for 2008–2010 Ducati declared that the sport touring market was no longer part of their plans.

== Ducati ST2 ==
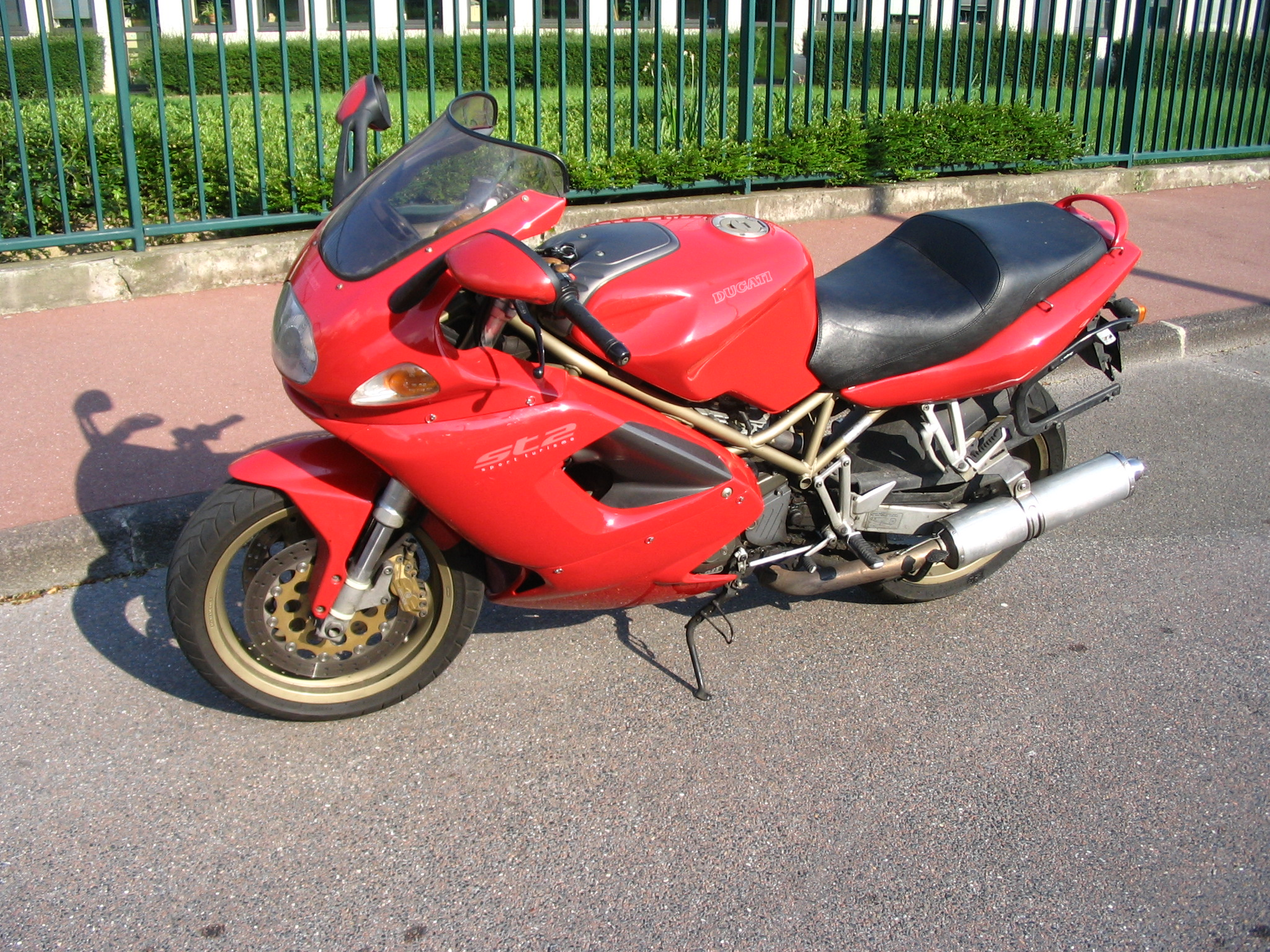
Ducati ST2

The Ducati ST2 was made between 1997 and 2003. For touring, the ST2 had seating for two, and wind protection from its full fairing. As a sport touring motorcycle the ST2 has hard luggage, relaxed ergonomics compared with sport bikes, and powerful engine in comparison to typical touring motorcycles. The frame is a tubular trellis frame, similar to the 916 frame in torsional rigidity and lightness. The Ducati ST2 has an engine derived from the 907 Ducati Paso, which had Ducati's signature 90° V-twin (or L-twin), SOHC, 2-valve desmodromic heads, Remus exhausts, 10.2:1 compression and Weber-Marelli electronic fuel injection with one injector and one spark plug per cylinder. It has an increased bore to 944cc and a heavier flywheel appropriate to its touring function. The suspension is fully adjustable for the early production series, with upside-down Showa forks at the front and Sachs rear shock, the same as the Ducati 916 Superbike but with softer damper ratings. The ST2 front brakes have twin 320mm floating Brembo discs and four-piston calipers, while the rear uses Brembo single 245mm disc with a twin-piston caliper. The OE tyres are Michelin Macadam or Metzeler's MEZ4 sport radials in 120/70 ZR17 for the front and 170/60 ZR17 for the rear, on Brembo rims.

== Ducati ST4 and ST4s ==
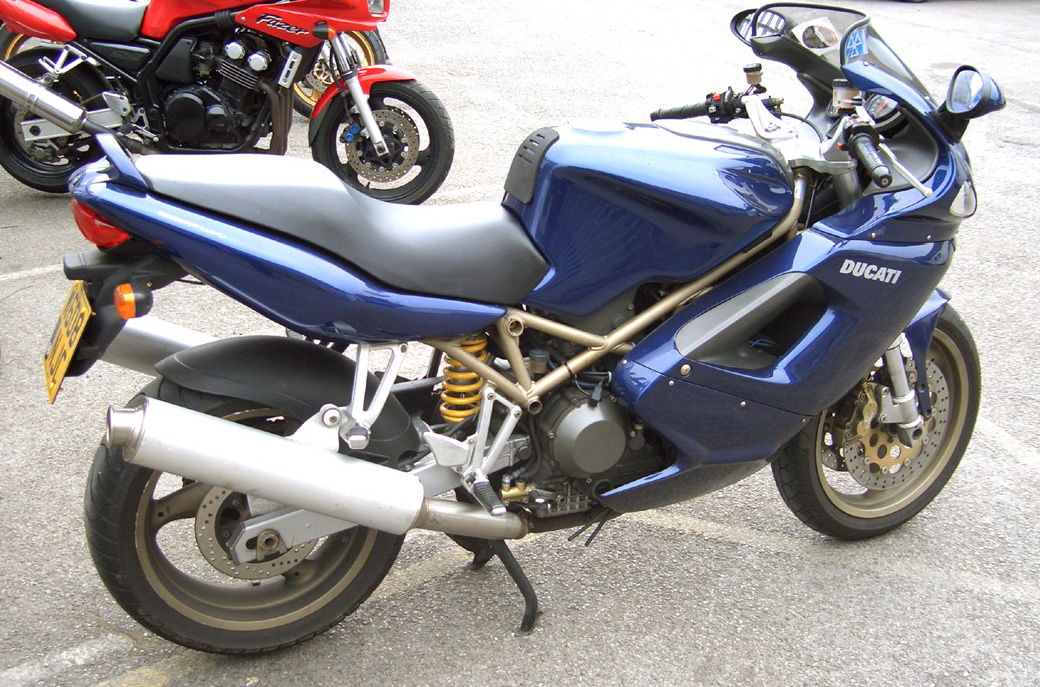
Ducati ST4

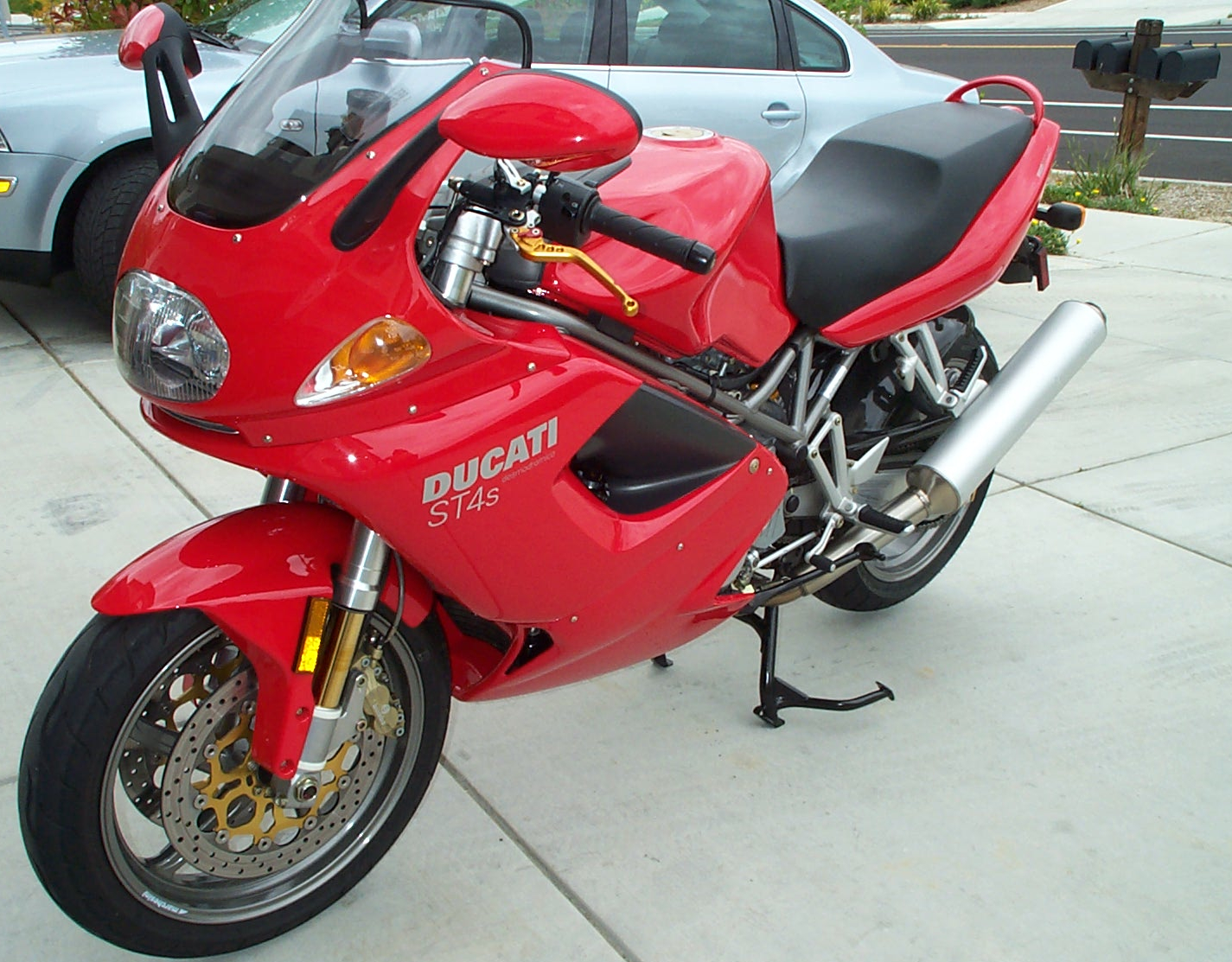
Ducati ST4s

The Ducati ST4 was manufactured between 1999 and 2005, and used a retuned version of the Ducati 916 engine.

The Ducati ST4s was based on the ST4, but had improved suspension and a larger engine, using the liquid-cooled Desmoquattro (four desmodromic valves) 90° V-twin engine based on the Ducati 996. The Desmoquattro was largely unchanged from the 996 Superbike, and retained a valve angle of 40°, but lost 4 mm of diameter on each of the intake throttle bodies (down from 54 mm on the 996). Chassis clearances also required the use of the more compact cylinder head design that was shared with the 748 Superbike and Monster S4. In spite of the smaller intakes, the ST4s actually made slightly more power and torque than the 996 Superbike due to the mostly straight-through design of the ST's exhaust, compared to the under-seat exhaust of the Superbike.

== Ducati ST3 & ST3s ==
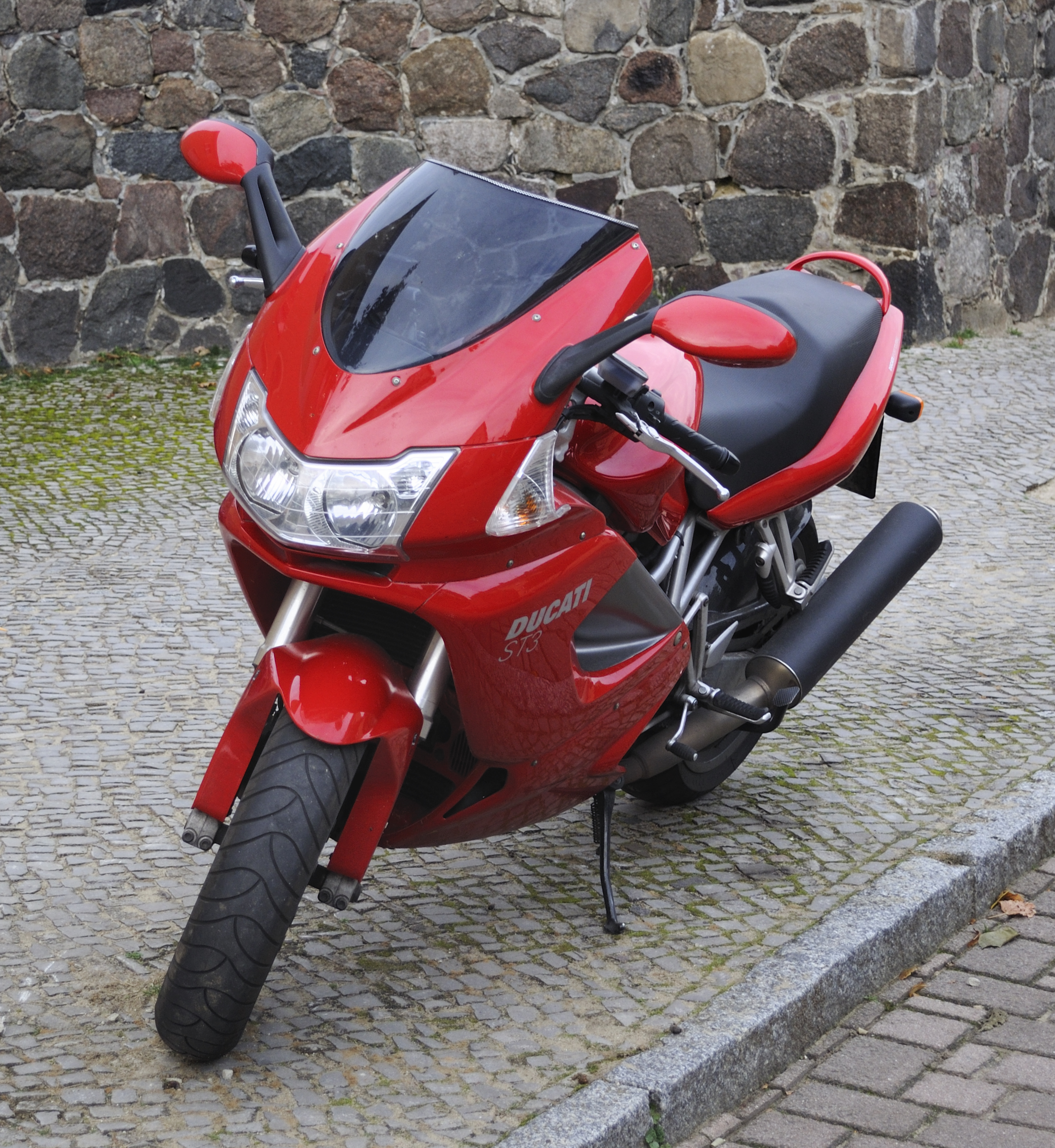
Ducati ST3 with fairing facelift

The Ducati ST3 was made between 2004 and 2007 and used the DesmoTre engine, an SOHC three-valve motor which could meet anti-pollution emissions limits. In 2005 power increased from 102bhp to 107bhp, and a wet clutch replaced the earlier dry clutch.

A reviewer said of the ST3: "The three-valve (two intake and one exhaust) desmotre engine has a much smoother powerband than the desmoquattro mill of the ST4 and simply runs better. The ST3 engine is user-friendly, offering ample power in any situation. We easily prefer this engine over the ST4, even if it doesn't have quite the top-end hit."

In The Daily Telegraph, Kevin Ash called the ST3s a "sports bike for all seasons", adding "Ducati has added anti-lock brakes to the ST3 sports tourer, and the result is impressive".

The ST3 was succeeded by the ST3s, which gained the superior suspension components of the ST4s. The ST3s was, in essence, an upgraded ST3 with fully adjustable forks, Öhlins rear shock and ABS braking.

== Specifications ==
Engine

- Layout: Transverse, liquid-cooled 90° V-twin, belt-driven DOHC, desmodromic valves.
- Induction: Marelli electronic fuel-injection with two 50 mm throttle bodies.
- Starting: Electric with anti-theft immobiliser, using a chip embedded in the key.

Transmission

- Six-speed gearbox with chain final drive:.
- Clutch:
  - 2002-2004: Hydraulically actuated dry multiplate clutch.
  - 2005: Hydraulically actuated wet multiplate clutch.

Chassis and suspension

- Wheelbase: 1,430 mm (56.3 in).
- Seat height: 820 mm (32.3 in).
- Weight (dry):
  - 2002-2003: 212 kg (467 lb).
  - 2004-2005: 201 kg (443 lb).
- Suspension:
  - Front: 43 mm Showa inverted cartridge forks, TiN-coated, adjustable for preload, compression and rebound damping.
    - Rake: 24°
  - Rear: Öhlins monoshock adjustable for preload, compression and rebound damping.
    - ST4s-specific light-weight boxed aluminum swingarm.
    - 2002 and 2003 models had a factory-installed carbon-fibre rear mudguard. Other years used an ABS-plastic part.

Wheels, brakes and tyres

- Wheels: Light-weight, cast Aluminum, Marchesini 5-spoke.
  - Front: 3.50 x 17.
  - Rear: 5.50 x 17.
- Brakes (ABS optional 2003-on):
  - Front: Twin 320 mm discs with Brembo four-pot opposed piston callipers.
  - Rear: Single 245 mm disc with Brembo twin-pot opposed piston calliper.
- Tyres:
  - Front: 120/70 ZR17 Michelin Pilot Sport tubeless.
  - Rear: 180/55 ZR17 Michelin Pilot Sport tubeless.
