= Ducati Desmo450 =

Off-road motorcycles

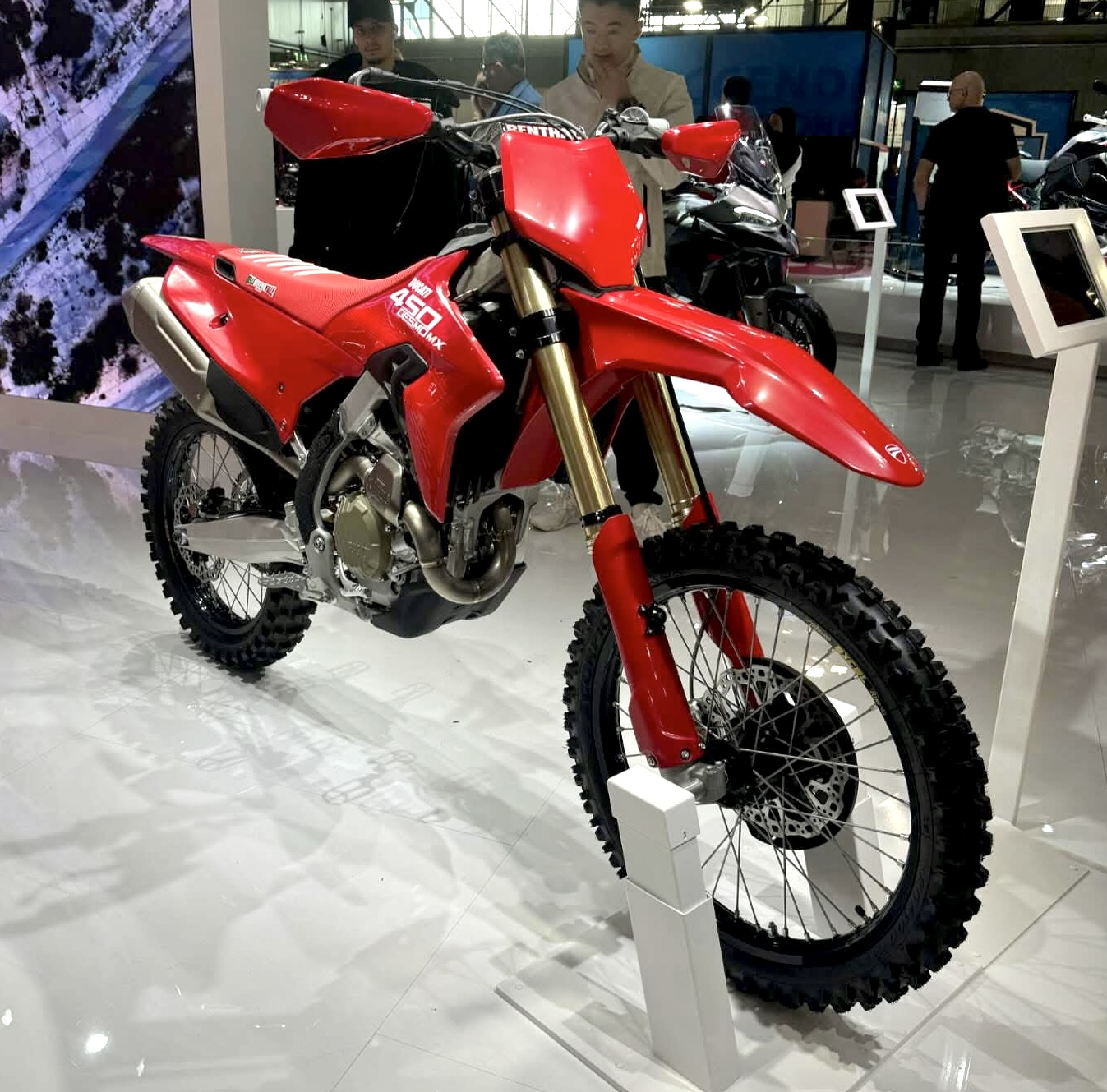
- 2026 Ducati Desmo450
- Manufacturer: Ducati
- Production: 2025
- Class: Off-road
- Engine: Liquid cooled 449 cc (27.4 cu in) single cylinder, 4-valve desmodromic
- Bore / stroke: 96mm x 62.1mm
- Power: Claimed: 63.5 hp (47.4 kW) @ 9,400 rpm (MX/EDX)
- Torque: Claimed: 53.6 N⋅m (39.5 lbf⋅ft) @ 7,400 rpm (MX/EDX)
- Transmission: Multi-plate Clutch wet , chain drive, 5 speed (MX); 6 speed (EDX/EDS)
- Frame type: Aluminum
- Suspension: Showa Front: 310 mm (12 in); Rear: 301 mm (11.9 in)
- Wheelbase: 58.8 in (1,490 mm)
- Weight: Claimed (MX): 231 lb (105 kg) (dry)
- Related: Ducati DesertX

The Ducati Desmo450 is a range of off-road motorcycles by the Italian manufacturer Ducati. The Desmo450 MX was introduced to the off-road racing world in 2024 and features the desmodromic valve system. It was developed with the assistance of Tony Cairoli and Alessandro Lupino with the intent of competing in the world of Motocross. The fuel injected, liquid cooled, four-stroke engine benefits from Ducati's years of experience with high performance motorcycles.

The Desmo450 MX claims 63.5 horsepower at 9400 rpm and 39.5 ft-lbs of torque at 7500. The engine revs to 11,900 rpm, unusual for a 450, due to the advantage given by the Desmo valve system. Desmodromic valves are closed with a separate, dedicated cam lobe and lifter instead of the conventional valve springs. Additionally the inlet valves are titanium and the stainless steel exhaust valves have hallow shafts filled with sodium to handle the heat of the exhaust. Special radiators are employed to control engine temperature.

The second release in the Desmo450 line came in the form of the cross-country racing Desmo450 EDX. Announced in 2025 as a 2026 model, it has slightly softer suspension, a 2.25 gallon fuel tank, an 18" rear wheel, skid plate, kickstand, and hand guards all adding about 5 lbs to the weight of the MX bike.

The third release in the Desmo450 line came in the form of the 2027 dual-sport Desmo450 EDS. It is a homologated street legal version of the EDX model. The engine has been reworked to meet standards by reducing compression, a revised crankshaft and flywheel, and a smaller 42mm throttle body with a performance reduction to 42 hp at 6750 rpm and 33 ft-lbs torque at 5750 rpm as a result. A performance kit is available with the result of gaining 12 hp and losing the street legal certification. It comes standard with a 2.2 gal. fuel tank, handguards, bash plate, DOT approved tires and LED lighting. With all the street legal additions it weighs in at 264 lbs.
