= Bimota DB1 =

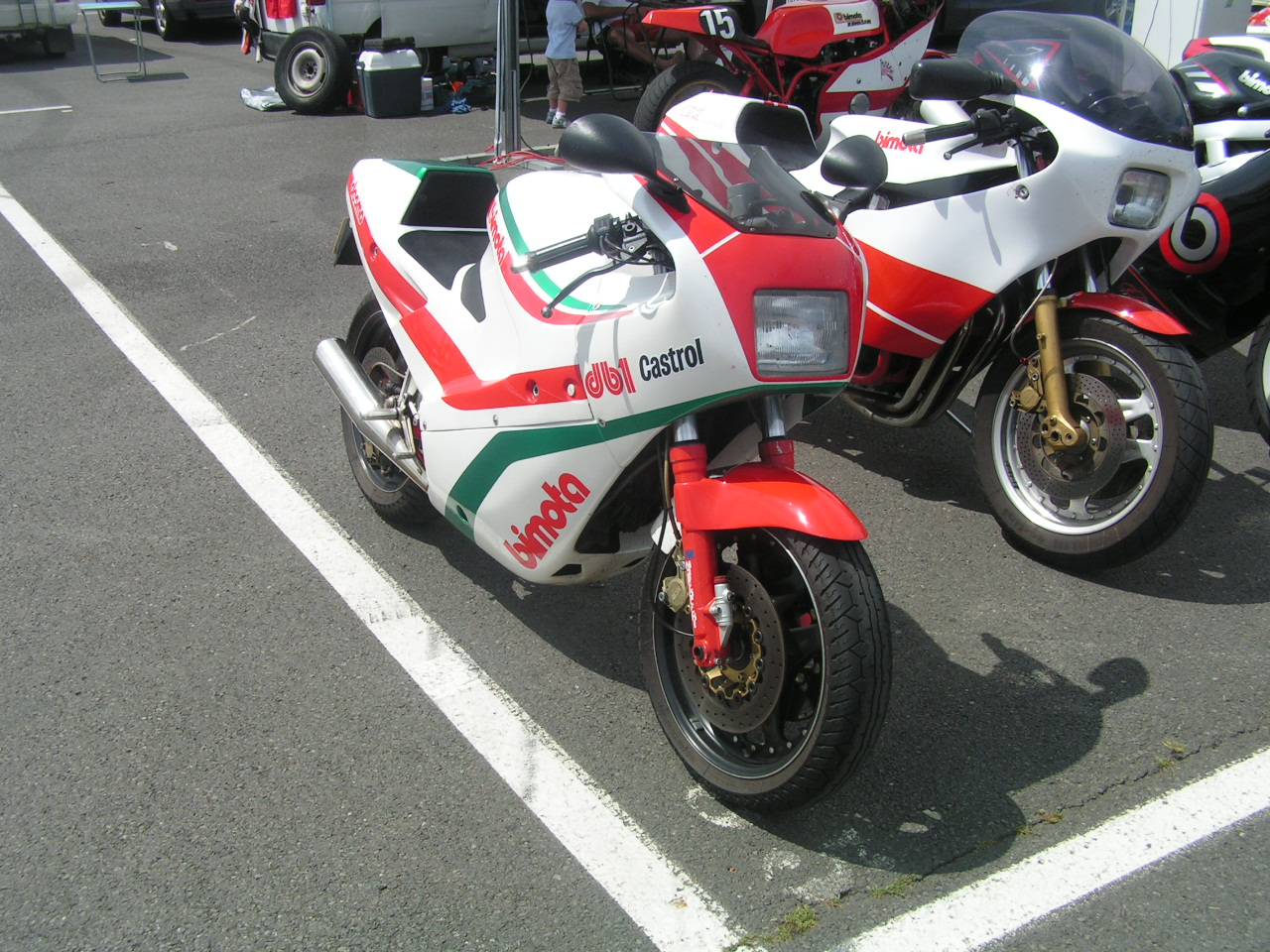
- Manufacturer: Bimota
- Production: 1985 - 1990, 688 produced
- Predecessor: Cagiva/Ducati 650 cc, Prototype
- Successor: DB2
- Class: Sport/Race
- Engine: 750 cc Ducati 90° V-twin
- Power: DB1J 400 cc: 42 hp, DB1: 62 hp, DB1S: 72 hp, DB1SR: 82 hp, DB1R: 92 hp
- Transmission: 5-Speed Manual
- Frame type: Chrome-Molybdenum Steel
- Suspension: Marzocchi M1R Forks, Marzocchi Rear Shock
- Brakes: Brembo, Goldline, Full Floating Cast Iron Front Rotors
- Tires: Pirelli 16" 130/60 in FRONT and 160/60 in REAR
- Rake, trail: 25° (DB1R 29°), 105 mm
- Wheelbase: 54.5"
- Weight: 355 lb. (DB1R 295 lb.) (dry)

The Bimota DB1 was a motorcycle manufactured by Bimota between 1985 and 1990 in Rimini, Italy. Originally commissioned by Cagiva, the DB1 was designed by Bimota's Technical Director, and ex-Ducati engineer, Dr. Federico Martini, and it saved Bimota from almost certain bankruptcy. DB1 stands for Ducati Bimota One, i.e. the first Bimota powered by a Ducati engine compared to, say, the SB3 - Suzuki, Bimota, third design.

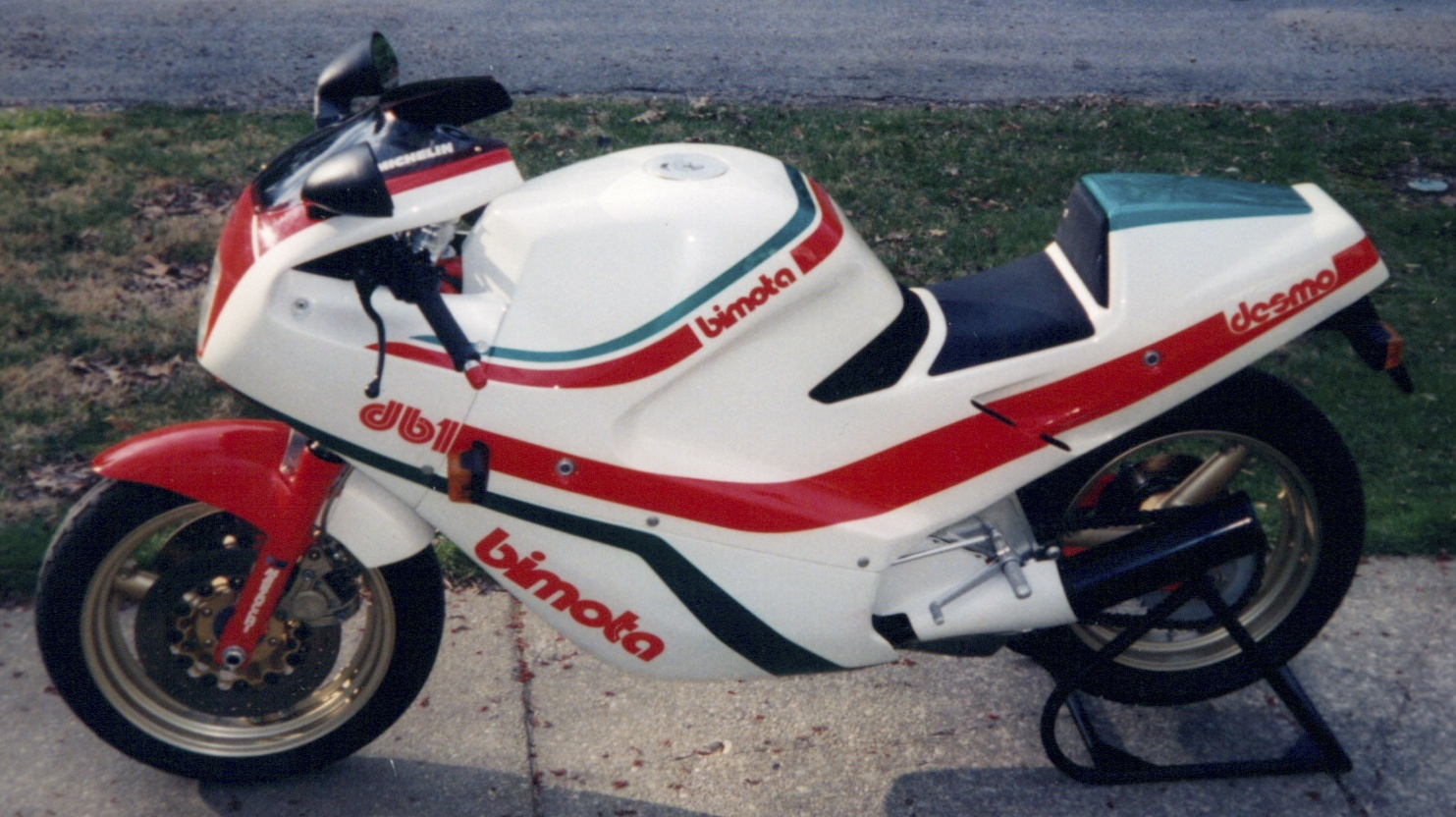
Bimota DB1

== Features ==
Being the first all-Italian Bimota it came with a 750 cc Ducati 90° V-twin engine with Desmodromic valve-train in different levels of tune and styling. The frame is made of Chrome-Molybdenum steel tubing and uses a Triangulated Upper Space Frame or "Birdcage" design. The engine is a stressed member and the swingarm pivots in engine's crankcase. The DB1s triple-trees, clip-ons, rear-sets and several other bits are made of lightweight, hot stamped and billet Avional 14 aluminum. The Cagiva/Bimota/Ducati/DB1 prototype morphed into the Ducati Paso ironically designed by Bimota co-founder Massimo Tamburini. While the DB1's small size made it light weight, it resulted in difficult ergonomics for taller riders. Also, the large single-piece tank/seat bodywork was difficult to remove without a helper.

== Models ==
=== DB1 ===
Several DB1 models were produced. The standard DB1 has 36 mm carburetors, a restrictive airbox and a quiet 2-into-2 exhaust. It was made between 1985 and 1986 and while not powerful it is extremely refined.

=== DB1J ===
A 400 cc version of the DB1, for the Japanese market, was produced between 1986 and 1987.

=== DB1S ===
The DB1S is a slightly higher performance version of the 750 cc DB1 with 40 mm carburetors and freer 2-into-2 exhaust and was made between 1986 and 1987. Both the DB1 and the DB1S needed to be re-jetted upon delivery to run properly and make proper horsepower for the design.

=== DB1SR ===
The DB1SR is an even higher performance version with 4-piston front calipers, 41 mm carburetors, freer 2-into-1 exhaust and more radical cam shafts and was made between 1987 and 1989. Confusingly, most DB1SRs are labeled "DB1RS" on the fairing and some are styled differently with a rear red number plates and correctly labeled "DB1SR". The DB1SR can be compared to Ducati's Laguna Seca/Montjuich/Santa Monica models, upgraded 750 F1s.

The DB1SR was successfully raced in Italy by Tiziano Bombardi, winning the 1987 Italian Sport Production Twins Championship, finishing on top of the podium in 8 of the 9 races, with one second-place finish.

=== DB1SR Serie Finale ===
The DB1SR Serie Finale is similar in performance and style to the DB1SR yet with a green stripe and a silver plaque on the right side of the swingarm. These bikes were assembled in 1990 using the last 7 DB1 frames at the request of the Bimota Club USA President, Sam Bernstein, upon visiting the Bimota Factory. Three went to the US, at least one went to Japan, at least one went to France.

=== DB1R ===
The DB1R is a Factory Corsa (race), or Works, bike made between 1985 and 1986. These bikes have many enhancements including several parts made of magnesium, different triple-trees (29° vs. 25°, identical trail at 105 mm), high-performance engine internals, higher rear-sets, 42 mm carburetors, open 2-into-1 exhaust and no lights with the oil cooler in the nose of the fairing. DB1R frames don't have the three fuel cell mounts, the two steering stop mounts or the keyed steering lock (like the DB1/DB1S/DB1SR/DB1SR Serie Finale strada (street) frames). The aluminum fuel cell is made into the bodywork and can be identified by the upper vent hose.

== Production ==
The DB1 production was as follows:

Type	Quantity	Notes
Ducati/Cagiva Prototype 650cc	1	
DB1 750 cc	400	5 kits, 307 went to Japan, 12 went to US
DB1J 400 cc	53	53 went to Japan
DB1S	63	
DB1SR Prototype	1	
DB1SR	153	
DB1SR Serie Finale	7	Last 7 frames, assembled in 1990, 3 went to US
DB1R	10	details below
Total	688	

=== Individual examples ===
List of Bimota DB1Rs:

1. 1985, #00001, the first DB1 was a DB1R prototype, unique aluminum rear subframe and right-side shift, raced by Davide Tardozzi.
2. 1986, #00200, engine DM650L-612148, a "Corsa" per Bimota factory paperwork, bike was imported into Florida, USA alongside bike #00201 in February 1986. Raced by Malcolme Tunstall, FL, at Daytona in 1986 & 1987, won the 1987 US Formula 2 Expert Championship, to MS then sold, sold again in 2022.
3. 1986, #00201, engine DM650L-612149, a "Corsa" per Bimota factory paperwork, bike was imported into Florida, USA alongside bike #00200 in February 1986. Raced by Davide Tardozzi at Daytona in March 1986. Raced by AMA racer James Lombardo, PA, from 1986 to 1990. #00201 was thought to be destroyed in a crash/fire on the banking of Rockingham Speedway in North Carolina in 1990. Parts that survived the crash (except for the damaged frame that was later repaired/repainted) and new parts were assembled/restored using NOS Strada frame #00700 with new factory bodywork sourced at the time of the crash and the original factory-built race engine restored by Fast by Ferracci, now in the Bimota Spirit Museum in North Carolina. The original frame (#00201) was stored at Cycle Specialties in Athens, GA for many years until PB, GA, sold it to GR, NY, at Barber Motorsports Park, AL, in October 2011. Then sold to AC, CA, in October 2012 and built into a street bike, using engine RAA5008020, completed in May 2018.
4. 1986, #00202, the first customer DB1R per Federico Martini, prepared by Ian Gowanloch, Pete Smith and Arthur Davis, NCR engine size increased to 940cc and 980cc, GPM close-ratio transmission, raced by Chris Oldfield in Australia and at Daytona in the Battle of the Twins race in 1987 & 1988, still in Australia.
5. 1985, #00203 (suspect as #00203 is registered as a street DB1), engine DM650L-612149 (suspect as this engine originally came in #00201, per Bimota factory paperwork and is currently in frame #00700), raced in 1985 Bol d'Or in France by Davide Tardozzi, Massimo Matteoni & Rossi, raced in 1985 & 1986 TT F1 World Championship by Davide Tardozzi, raced in 1986 & 1987 AMA ProTwins Championship by Alan Cathcart, now in Italy.
6. 1985, #00204, Bimota Classic Parts, Italy.
7. 1985, #00210, engine DM600L-702640, raced by Dale Quarterley in 1986 winning at Laguna Seca, raced by Johnny Virgadamo, to GR, to BH in Canada.
8. 1985, #00212, engine DM750L7502269 raced by Oscar La Ferla, still in Italy.
9. 1985, #00214, engine DM650L612034, raced by Davide Tardozzi, to Gonzo in Japan, sold.
10. 1985, #00541, unassembled/complete Corsa Kit with NCR racing engine, once part of the Francesco Romanelli Collection, now part of the Musee L'Epopee de la Moto collection, sold.

DB1Rs were also raced by Pirovano, Berti, and Vitali.
