= Tamburini Corse =

Talian-Sammarinese motorcycle manufacturer

- Industry: Motorcycle manufacturing
- Founded: 2009
- Founder: Andrea Tamburini
- Headquarters: Serravalle, San Marino
- Products: Motorcycle
- Website: http://www.tamburinicorse.com

Tamburini Corse is an Italian-Sammarinese motorcycle manufacturer. It was founded in 2009 by Andrea Tamburini, son of Massimo Tamburini, originally producing small metal components.

The T12 Massimo, introduced in 2016, has a unique feature allowing on-the-fly adjustment of lateral frame stiffness, and has a dry weight of 154 kilograms (340 lb).

== Motorcycle designs ==
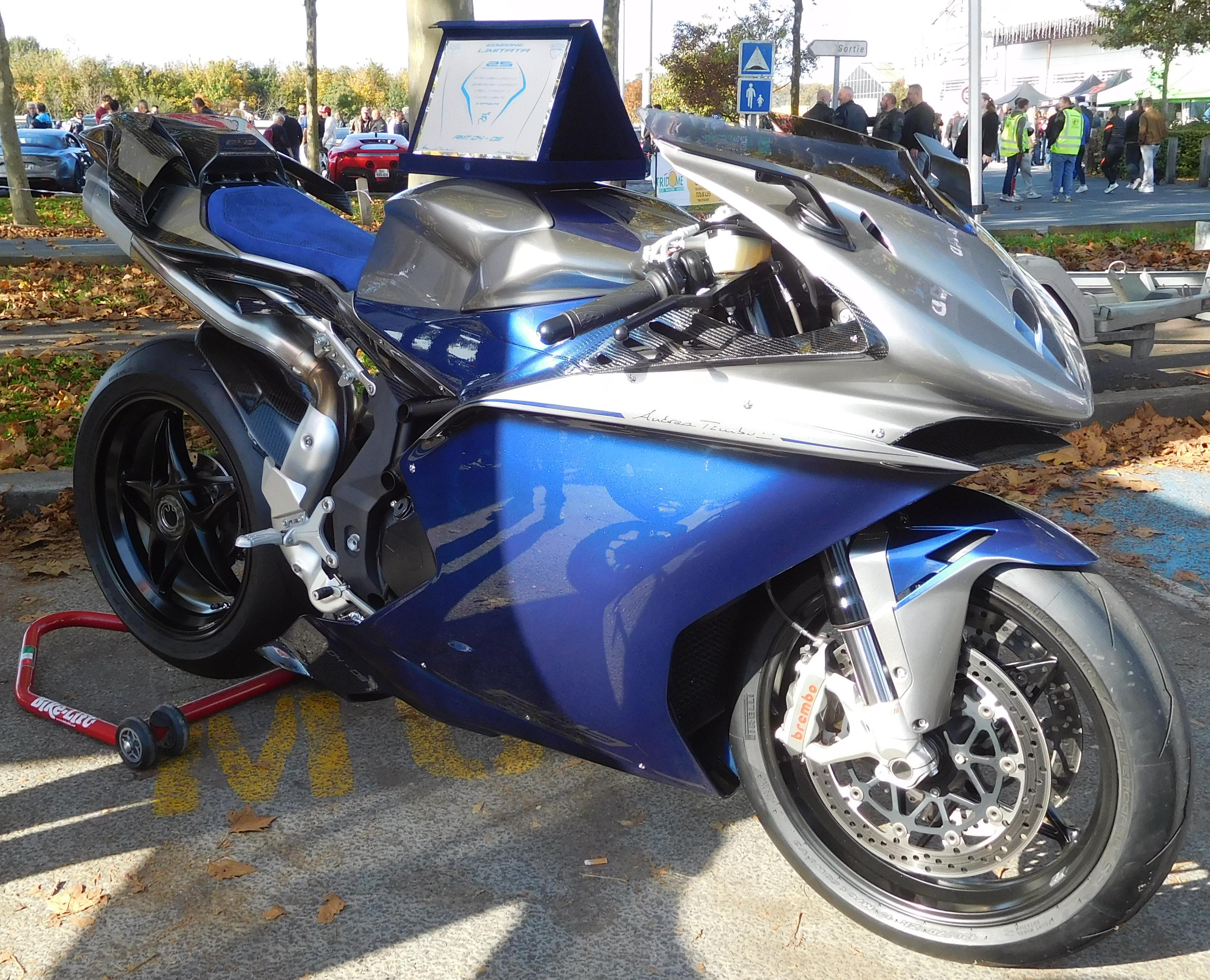
MV Agusta Tamburini Corse F43 Tributo Viper (5 kits produced)

- MV Agusta Brutale Tamburini Corse T1 (99 produced)
- Tamburini Corse T12 Massimo
