= Ducati Paso =

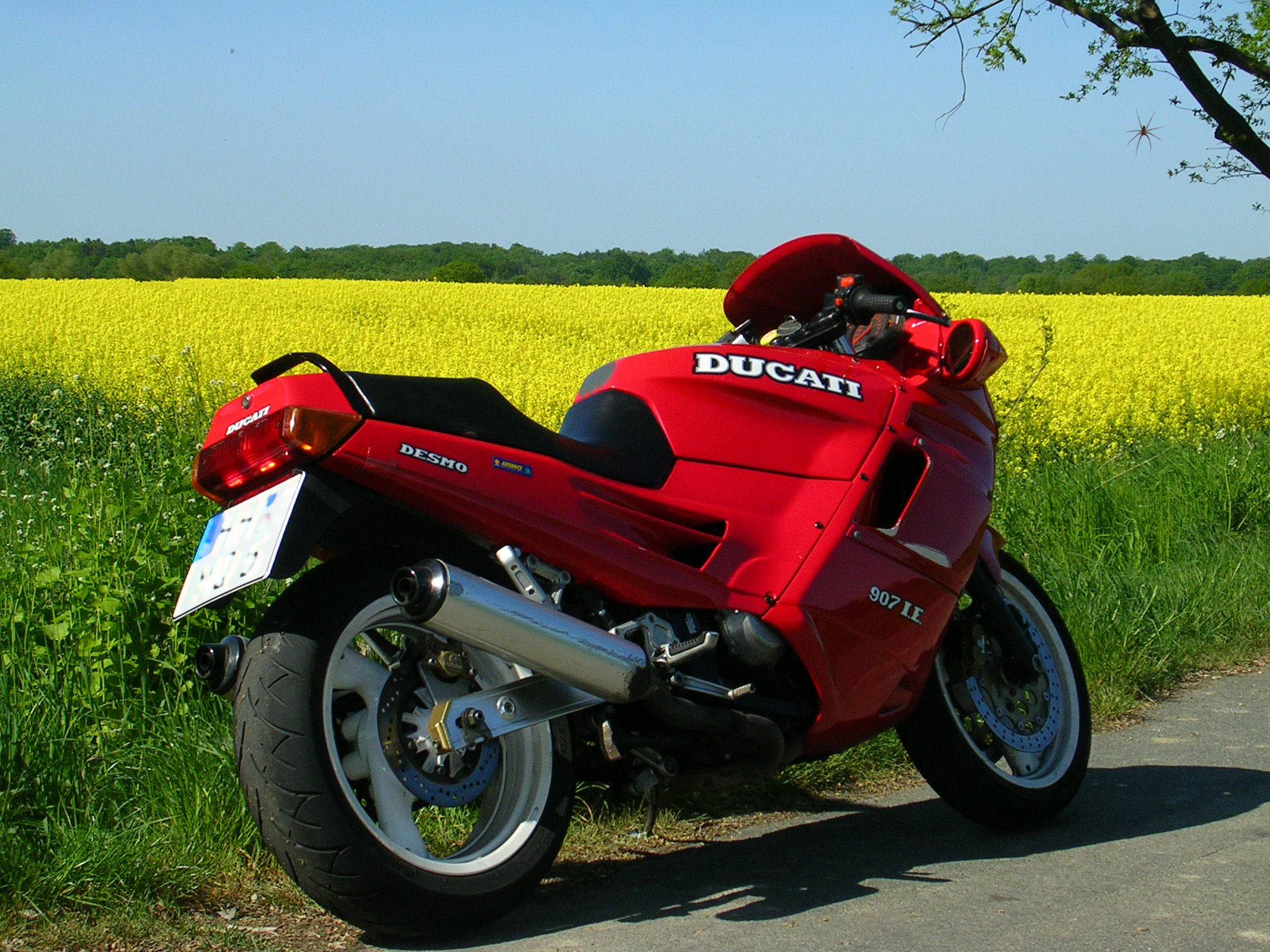
- A Ducati Paso 906
- Manufacturer: Ducati
- Production: 1986–1988; 4,863 sold
- Predecessor: Ducati 750 F1 Sport
- Class: Sport bike
- Engine: 748 cc air-cooled L-twin, single overhead cam desmodromic
- Bore / stroke: 88 x 61.5 mm
- Compression ratio: 10:1
- Top speed: 131 mph
- Power: 72 hp @ 7,900 rpm
- Transmission: 5-speed
- Brakes: dual 11 in discs front, single 10 in disc rear
- Rake, trail: 25 degree rake, 4.1 in trail
- Wheelbase: 57.2 in
- Seat height: 30.6 in
- Weight: 429 lbs (dry); 484 lbs (wet)
- Fuel capacity: 5.8 gal

The Ducati Paso was introduced in 1986 with the slogan "Il nostro passato ha un grande futuro" (Our past has a great future). The name was in honor of racer Renzo Pasolini, nicknamed "Paso," who died on 20 May 1973 in an accident at the Monza racetrack during the Italian motorcycle Grand Prix (Gran Premio motociclistico d'Italia).

== Background ==
The Cagiva (from CAstiglioni GIovanni VArese) company, founded by the Castiglioni brothers, needed an engine – while Ducati, who had just been released from a difficult past of statutory public management (IRI), needed revenue.

Over a series of Italian-style meetings and lunches in 1984, they agreed on a deal for Ducati to supply engines to Cagiva and then go out of the business of producing motorcycles. However, the Castiglioni brothers of Cagiva were eventually offered a deal to buy Ducati, subject to the Ducati name living on as an actual motorcycle product. On the closure of the deal, Ducati engines were instantly installed in a number of Cagiva bikes, which included the Alazzurra and the Elefant enduro bike.

At the time of the takeover, due to its financial difficulties, Ducati was in a state of suspended animation with regard to engineering development. By that time, the classic bevel-drive V-twin, which was old and expensive to produce, had been replaced by the belt-drive Pantah, designed by Fabio Taglioni. The Pantah was already known to be a strong and capable engine, and known to deliver in the Ducati 750 F1.

The Pantah engine is equipped with desmodromic valves and has been many times. Cagiva used this engine to create a new type of Ducati motorcycle. Their goal was to design a bike that looked different from the previous models and created a new direction for the brand's engineering and style

== The design challenge ==
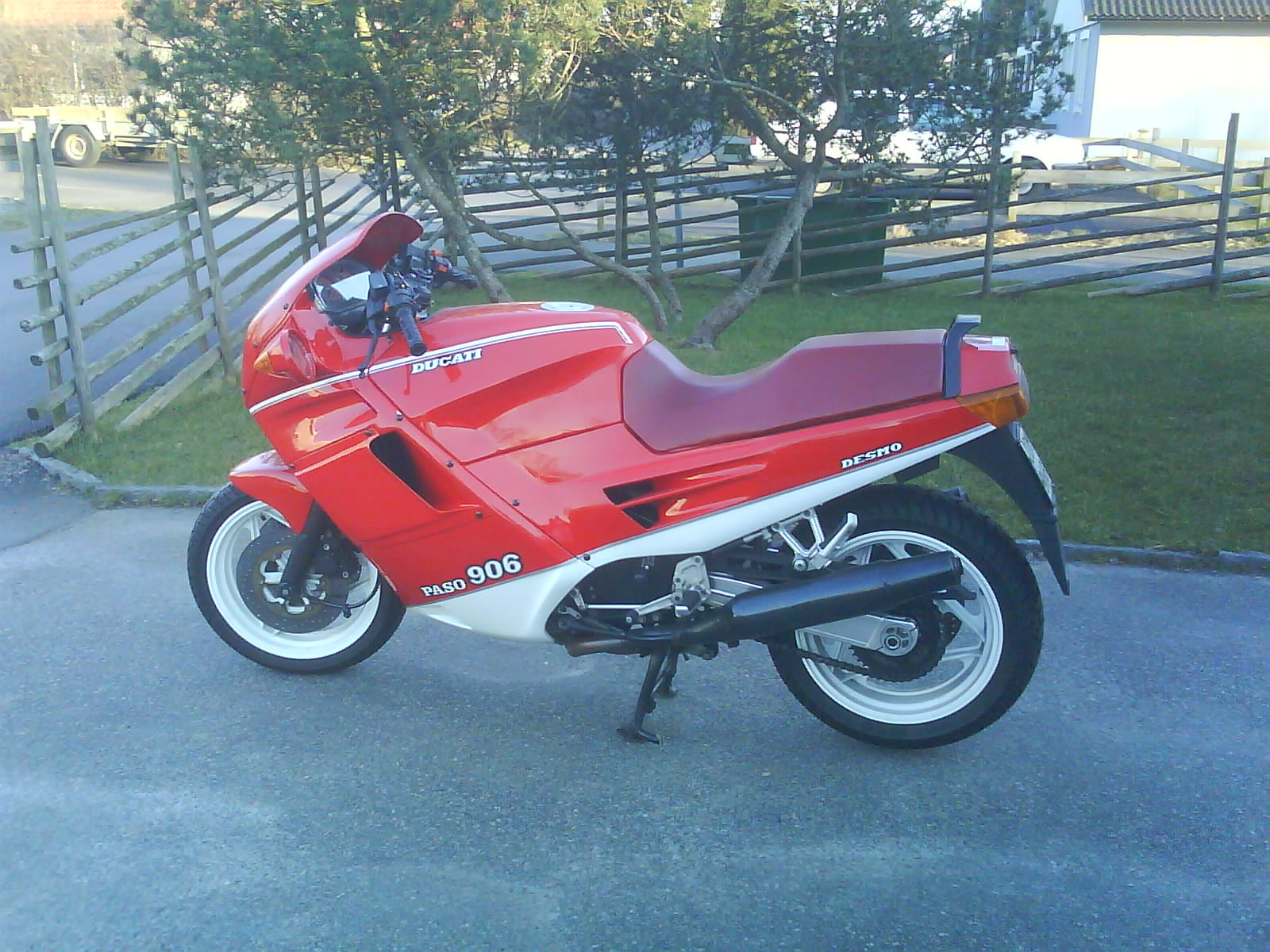
A 1989 Ducati 906 Paso

The challenge consisted of constructing a bike with innovative technical characteristics and image to fight the intense Japanese competition. To undertake the ambitious objective, Ducati hired Massimo Tamburini, co-founder of Bimota. Tamburini would go on to design the Ducati 916 and MV Agusta F4 series, included in the Guggenheim Museum's The Art of the Motorcycle exhibition of 1988–1999, and the MV Agusta Brutale series.

Tamburini decided to streamline the bike and its 750cc motor in a close-fitting integral fairing that hid all mechanical parts—one of the first motorcycles to do this, along with the Honda CBR Hurricane series, introduced the same year. He also reversed the rear cylinder head in order to meet emissions and noise restrictions abroad. The Paso 750 was equipped with the latest-generation technical features: square frame tubes made of chromoly steel, a rear aluminium swingarm with progressive suspension, 16-inch wheels with radial tires, air-and-oil cooled engine, ⁣ electronic ignition and a comprehensive dashboard.

The finished design was christened the Paso 750 and debuted at the 1985 Milan Motorcycle Show, along with a 350-cc version that was never produced. Although initially offered only in red, by 1988 it was offered in red, blue and pearl white. Ducati and Cagiva had hopes that the new machine would redefine sports touring motorcycling and complement their sports bike line, especially in the American market.

== Sales and development ==
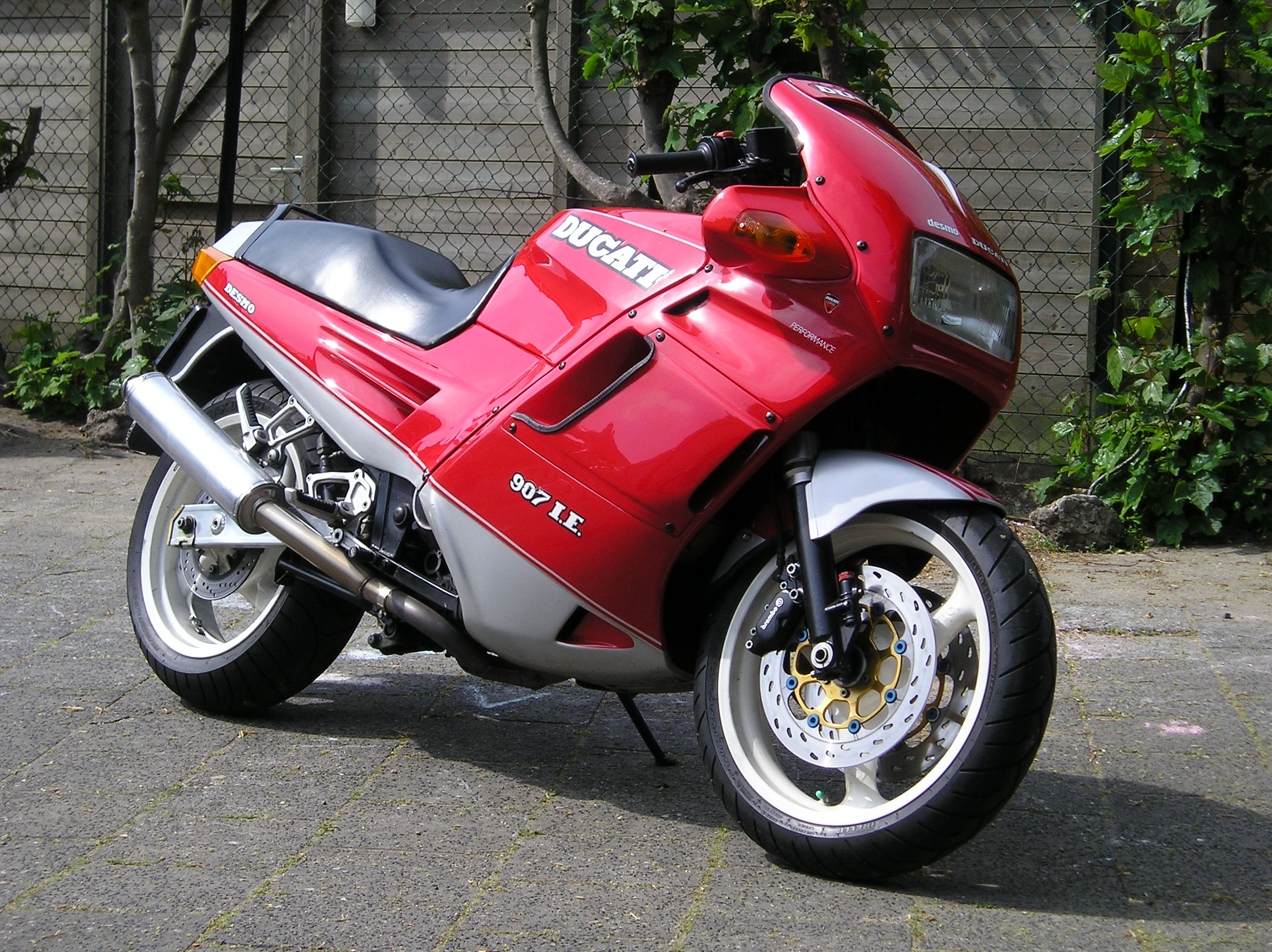
A 1993 Ducati 907 i.e.

The commercial success didn't come, however, and worldwide, the Paso 750 only sold 4,863 units between its introduction in 1986 and 1988. Only 700 were imported into the United States in 1987. The Paso was more expensive, had lower performance (72.5 hp and 210 km/h top speed) than its competitors, and had some reliability and ride-ability problems with the electrical and fuel systems, due to the use of an automotive Weber carburetor, which was ill-suited to a small-capacity motorcycle engine.

In 1989, the Paso 906 was introduced to replace the 750, with a six-speed gearbox, a 904cc engine which provided 88 hp and a 220 km/h top speed. The bike still had the same automotive carburettor and unreliable electrical system, but its greatest development was the incorporation of liquid cooling. 1,802 Paso 906's were built between 1988 and 1989.

After further development, the final version of the design came in 1991 with the 907 i.e. (iniezione elettronica, now without the name "Paso". The engine remained liquid-cooled, and the carburettor was replaced by the most modern Weber-Marelli IAW 043 system that integrated ignition and electronic fuel injection, which transformed the ride-ability of the bike. Power increased to 90 hp and top speed to 230 km/h. The wheels were changed to 17 inches, giving the bike more stability.

Despite these advances, sales of this model remained sluggish, and when production ceased in 1992 only 2,303 907IEs had been built.
