= Ducati Supermono =

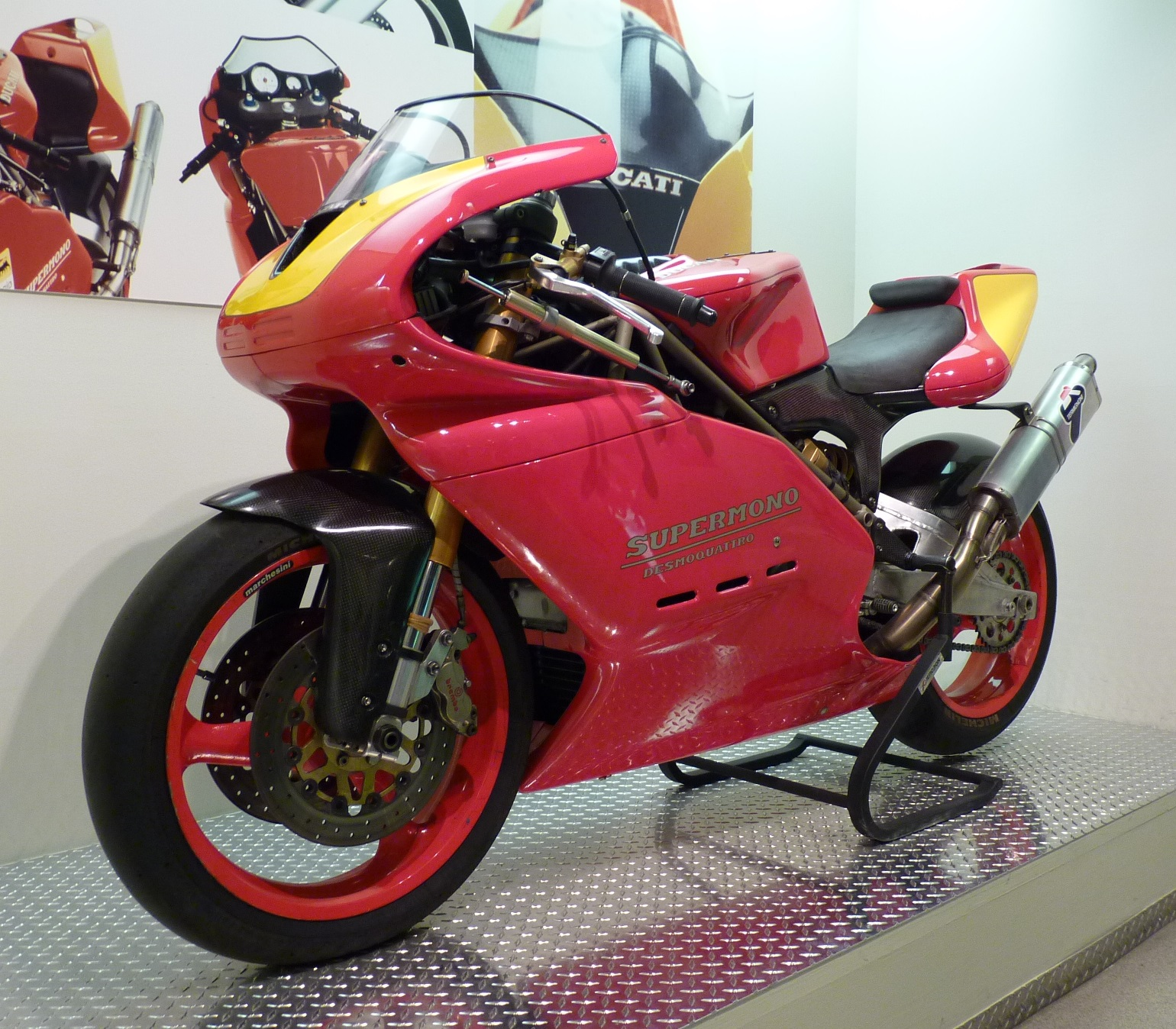
- Manufacturer: Ducati
- Production: 1993-1997, 67 units total
- Class: Racing
- Engine: 549 / 572 cc (33.5 / 34.9 cu in) four stroke desmodromic 4-valve single, liquid cooled, Weber fuel injection
- Bore / stroke: 100 mm / 102 mm × 70 mm (3.9 in / 4.0 in × 2.8 in)
- Compression ratio: 12:1
- Power: 75 hp (56 kW) at 10,000 rpm
- Torque: 50.8 N⋅m (37.5 lbf⋅ft) at 8,000 rpm
- Transmission: Multiplate dry clutch, 6-speed, chain
- Frame type: Tubular steel trestle
- Suspension: Öhlins. Front: telescoping upside-down fork Rear: swingarm
- Brakes: Brembo discs. Front: dual 280 mm (11 in), 4-piston calipers Rear: single 220 mm (8.7 in)
- Tires: Front: 120/60 VR17"; Rear: 155/60 VR17"; Cast magnesium wheels
- Wheelbase: 1,360 mm (54 in)
- Dimensions: L: 1,960 mm (77 in); W: 670 mm (26 in); H: 1,060 mm (42 in)
- Weight: 125.6 kg (277 lb) (dry)
- Fuel capacity: 15.1 L (3.3 imp gal; 4.0 US gal)

The Ducati Supermono is a lightweight, single-cylinder racing motorcycle made by Ducati and named after the Supermono racing class. 65 Supermonos were built by Ducati between 1993 and 1995.

== Technology ==
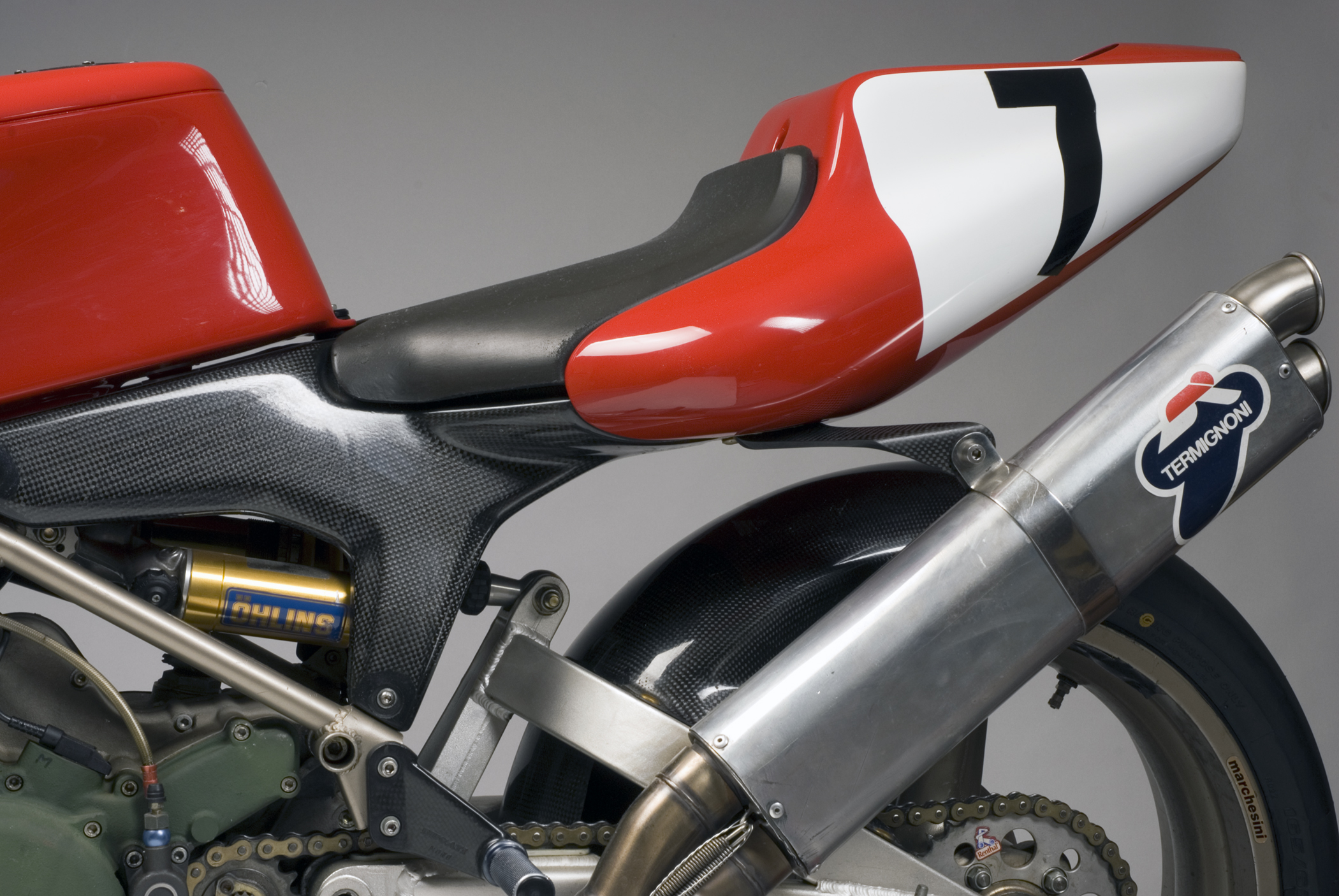
Supermono tail section

This lightweight, compact racer incorporated numerous technical innovations that had a significant influence on the design of the Ducati 916.

The single cylinder Ducati racer was built with power to weight in mind. Carbon fiber pieces included bodywork, sub frame, fuel tank, rear sets, airbox and instrument housing. Magnesium was used for case covers, chain adjustment covers and triple clamps.

The front suspension used an Öhlins 42 mm (1.7 in) inverted telescopic forks, similar to those used on the Ducati 888 Corsa, and the rear used a cantilevered Ohlins DU2041 shock. It had a Termignoni exhaust and 3 spoke Marchesini magnesium alloy wheels. The front brakes were Brembo 280 mm (11 in) fully floating iron front discs and Brembo P4 30-34 racing calipers.

The Supermono inherited many of its features from 888 Racing. Liquid cooled double overhead cam shaft with four valve desmodromic cylinder head. A horizontally placed 550 cc (34 cu in) cylinder used a dummy connecting rod that acted like a second piston in terms of making the dynamic balance equivalent to a ninety degree Vee twin. This engineering was the key to overcoming vibration problems typically handled with either balance shafts or the incomplete solution of a crank counterweight.

== Design ==
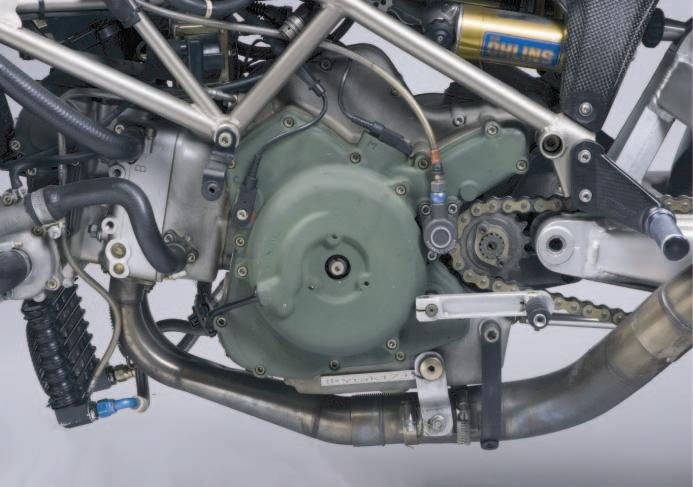
Supermono motor

Pierre Terblanche designed the look of the Supermono and Claudio Domenicali and Massimo Bordi designed the frame, power plant and other unique parts of the motorcycle.

=== Fuel and spark plugs ===
In the mid-1990s, 100 octane aviation gas was the fuel of choice for many Supermono race teams. Spark plugs with a 54 to 55 heat index were required. Several teams used Champion spark plug QA55V.

== Racing ==
New Zealander Robert Holden placed second in the 1994 Isle of Man TT, winning the 1995 singles title. Holden won Ireland's NW 200 Supermono class in 1995.

The Supermono was a "test bed" for the World Superbike racers, who would go on to race at the World Superbike Championship.
