= Ducati =

Italian motorcycle manufacturer

Coordinates: 44°31′03″N 11°16′03″E

Ducati Motor Holding S.p.A

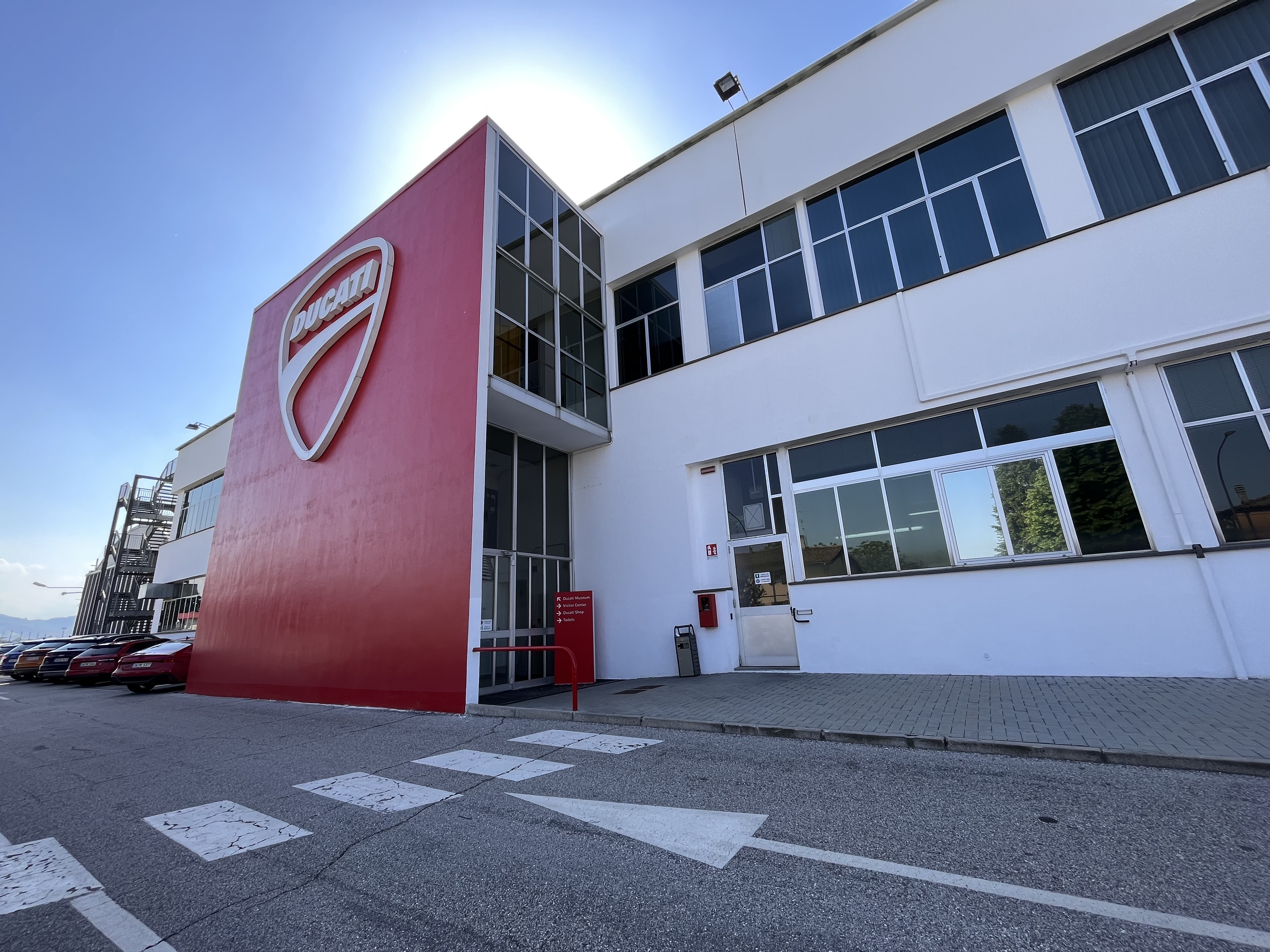
- Type: Subsidiary
- Industry: Motorcycle manufacturing
- Founded: 4 July 1926; 100 years ago
- Founders: Antonio Cavalieri Ducati; Adriano Cavalieri Ducati; Bruno Cavalieri Ducati
- Headquarters: Bologna, Italy
- Area served: Worldwide
- Key people: Claudio Domenicali, CEO
- Products: Motorcycles
- Production output: 50,895 units (2025)
- Revenue: ▼€925 million (2025)
- Net income: ▼€52 million (2025)
- Parent: Automobili Lamborghini S.p.A.
- Divisions: Ducati Corse
- Website: ducati.com

Ducati Motor Holding S.p.A (Italian pronunciation: [duˈkaːti]) is an Italian motorcycle manufacturing company headquartered in Bologna, Italy.

== History ==
A month after the official liberation of Italy in 1944, SIATA announced its intention to sell this engine, called the "Cucciolo" (Italian for "puppy," in reference to the distinctive exhaust sound) to the public.

The first Cucciolos were initially sold as standalone engines for buyers to mount onto standard bicycles. However, entrepreneurs soon began purchasing the engines in quantity and offering complete motorized bicycles for sale.

In 1950, after more than 200,000 Cucciolos had been sold, in collaboration with SIATA, the Ducati firm offered its own Cucciolo-based motorcycle.

This first Ducati motorcycle was a 48 cc bike weighing 98 lb (44 kg), with a top speed of 40 mph (64 km/h), and had a 15 mm carburetor (0.59 in) giving just under 200 mpg_{‑US} (1.2 L/100 km; 240 mpg_{‑imp}).

Ducati soon dropped the Cucciolo name in favor of "55M" and "65TL".

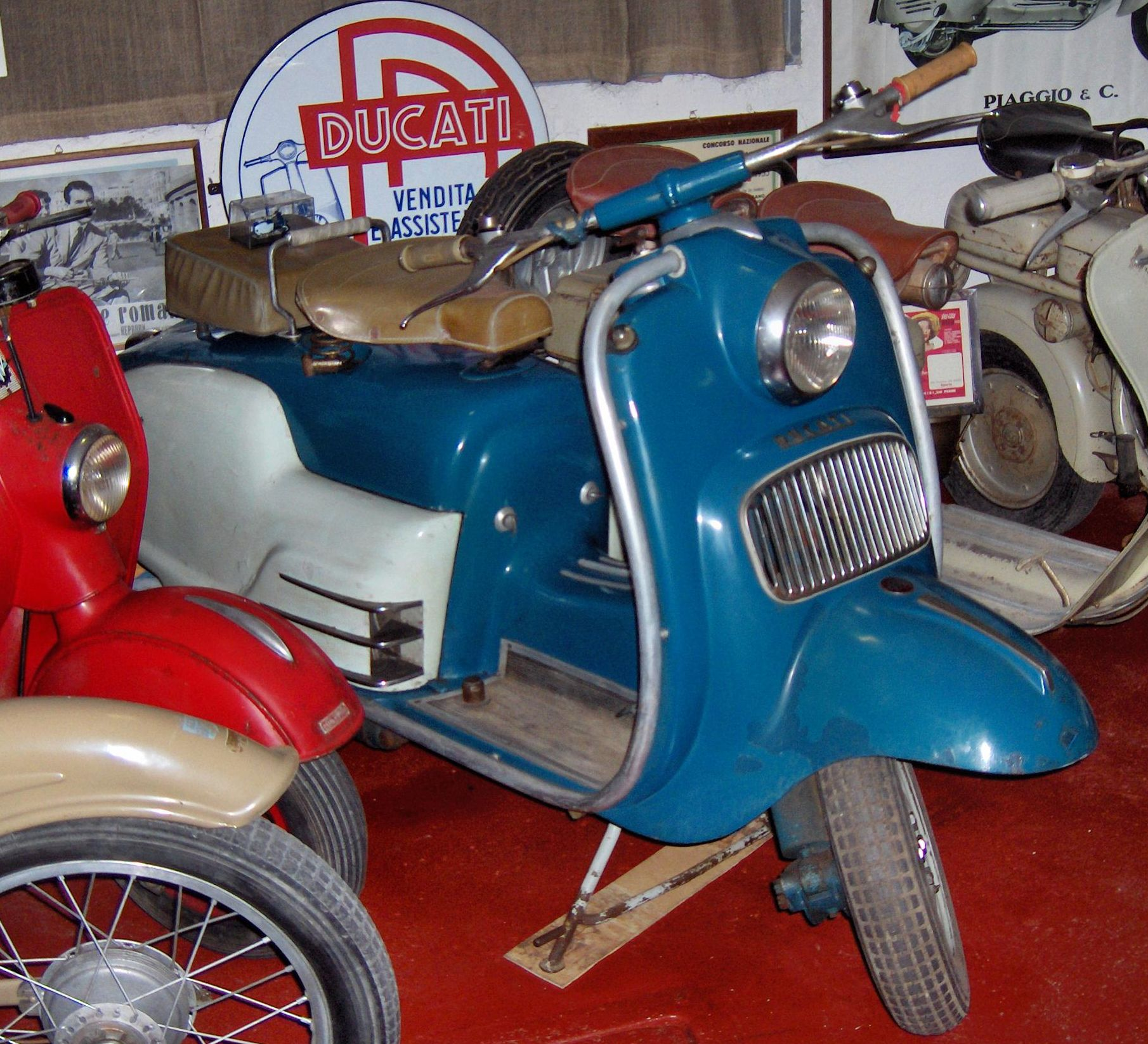
Ducati 175 Cruiser, 1952

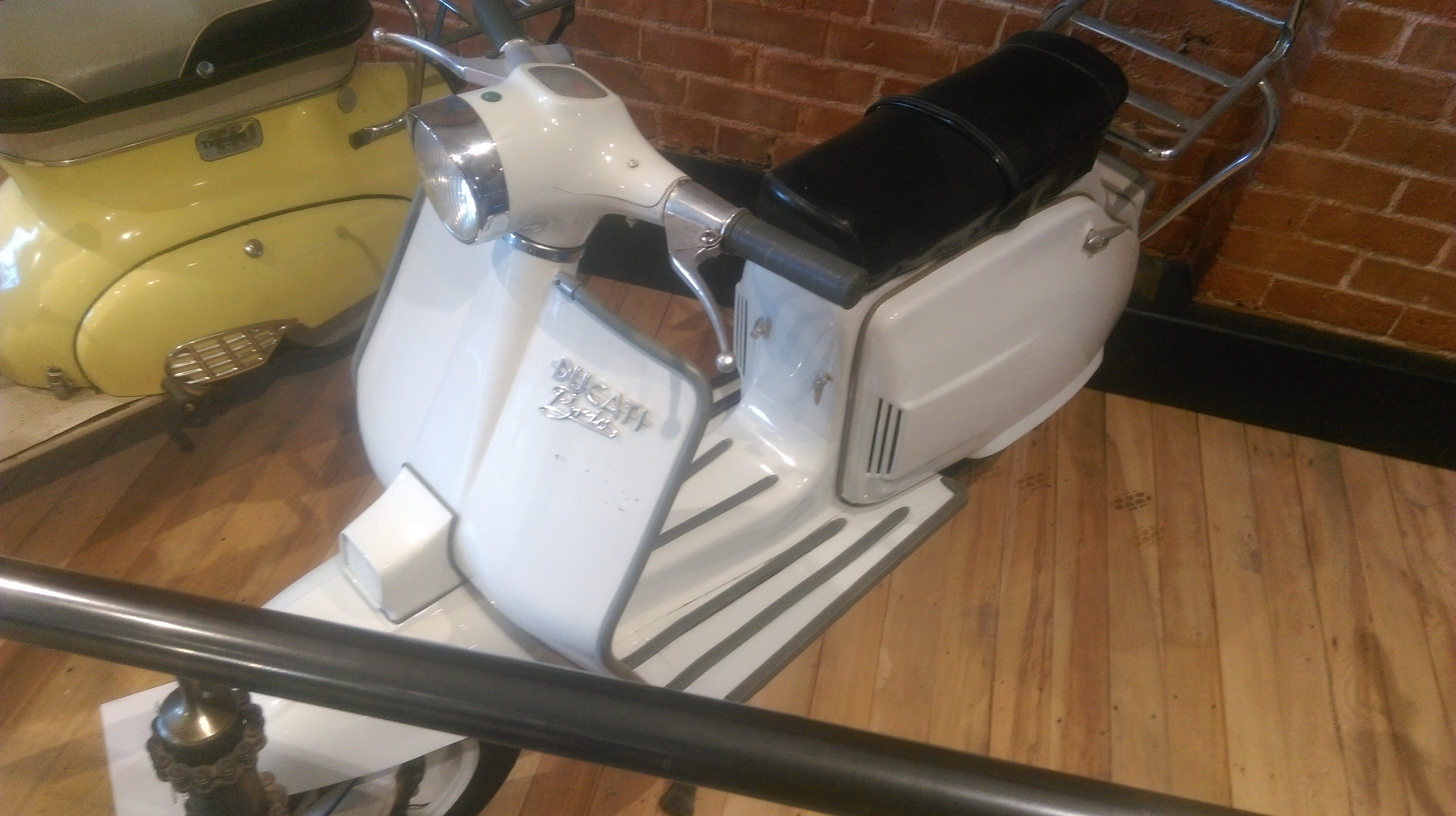
Ducati Brio 100, 1968

Ducati Mach 1

When the market moved toward larger motorcycles, Ducati management decided to respond, making an impression at an early-1952 Milan show, introducing their 65TS cycle and Cruiser (a four-stroke motor scooter).

Despite being described as the most interesting new machine at the 1952 show, the Cruiser was not a great success, and only a few thousand were made over a two-year period before the model ceased production.

In the 1960s, Ducati earned its place in motorcycling history by producing the fastest 250 cc road bike then available, the Mach 1.

In the 1960s and 1970s, Ducati produced a wide range of small two-stroke bikes, mainly sub-100 cc capacities.

Ducati's old logo used from 1997 to 2008

== Leadership ==
- Antonio, Adriano, Marcello, and Bruno Cavalieri Ducati (1926–1953)
- Giuseppe Montano (1953–1973)
- Cristiano de Eccher (1973–1978)
- Claudio and Gianfranco Castiglioni (1985–1996)
- Federico Minoli (1997–2000 and 2003–2007)
- Carlo Di Biagio (2000–2003)
- Gabriele Del Torchio (2007–2013)
- Claudio Domenicali (2013–present)

== Product history ==
=== 1950s ===
The first 4 stroke Single was the Ducati 60.

=== 1960s ===
In addition to manufacturing two-wheelers, Ducati also assembled Triumph Heralds for sale in the Italian market in their Borgo Panigale plant beginning in early 1963.

During the same decade, Ducati produced the Mach 1, the fastest 250 cc road bike available then, earning it a major spot in motorcycling history. The company introduced the high-capacity, V4-powered Ducati Apollo prototype, laying groundwork for many future multi-cylinder designs.

=== 1970s ===
In 1973, Ducati commemorated its 1972 win at the Imola 200 with the production model green frame Ducati 750 SuperSport.

Ducati also targeted the offroad market with the two-stroke Regolarità 125, building 3,486 models from 1975 to 1979, but the bike was not successful.

In 1975, the company introduced the 860 GT, designed by noted car stylist Giorgetto Giugiaro. Its angular lines were unique, but raised handlebars made for an uncomfortable seating position at high speeds and also caused steering issues. The 860GT's angular styling was a sales disaster, and it was hurriedly re-designed for the 1976 season with a more rounded fuel tank.

In 1975, Ducati offered hand-built production racers, the 'square case' 750SS and later 900SS models, built in limited numbers. Sales of the 900SS proved so strong, and sales of the 860GT/GTE/GTS so weak, that production of the 900SS was ramped up, and it became Ducati's #1 selling model.

=== 1980s ===
Ducati's liquid-cooled, multi-valve 90° V-twins, made from 1985 on, are known as Desmoquattro ("desmodromic valve four"). These include the 851, 916, 996, 999, and a few predecessors and derivatives.

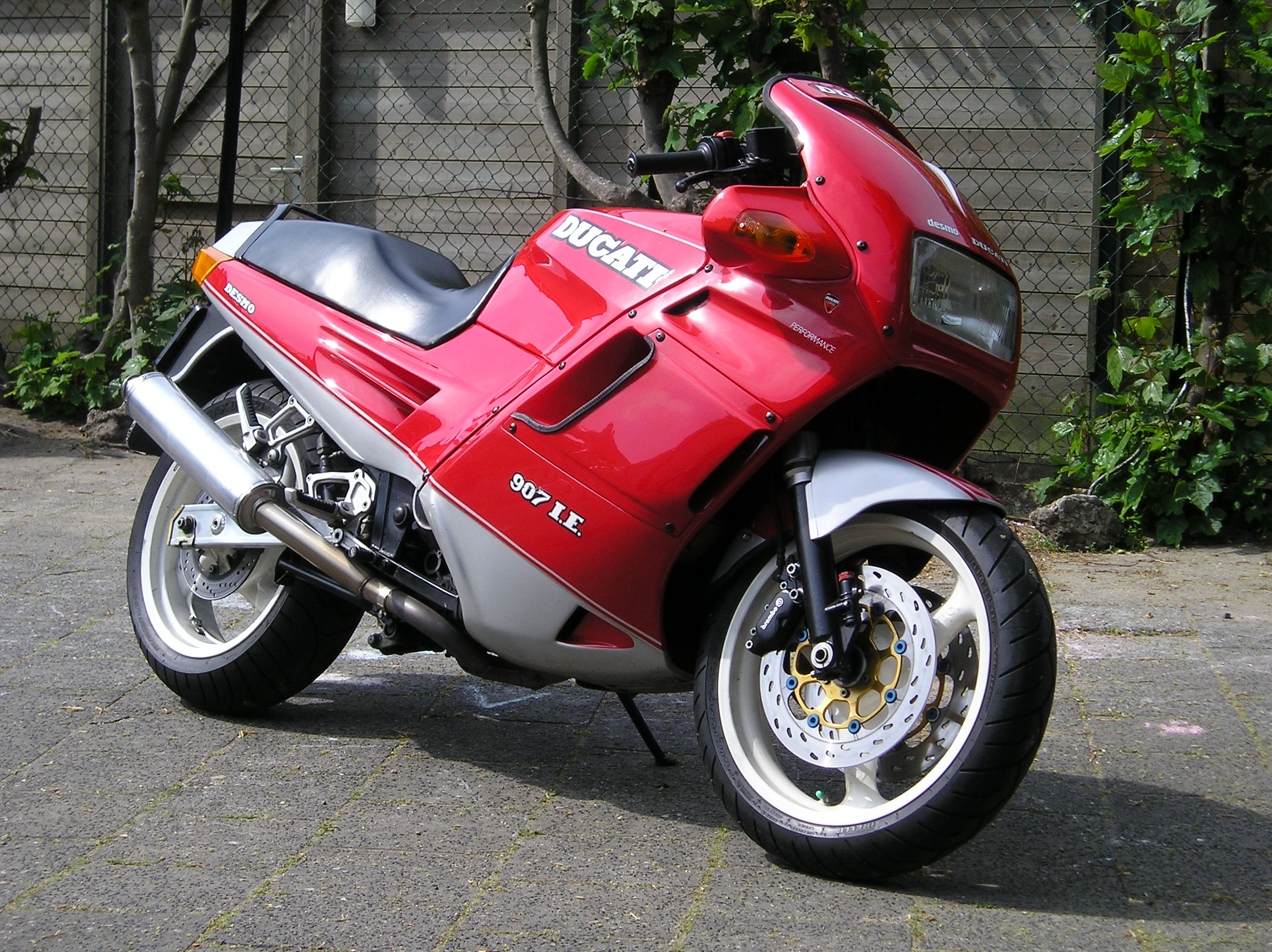
1993 Ducati 907 i.e.

The Ducati Paso was introduced in 1986 with the Paso 750, followed in 1989 with the Paso 906. The final version came in 1991 with the 907IE (Iniezione Elettronica), now without the name "Paso". The design was from the hand of Massimo Tamburini, who also designed the Ducati 916 and MV Agusta F4. The Paso was a typical "you love it, you hate it" bike. However, at that time it looked like that all-enclosed bodywork would be the future for all motorcycles. The Paso design was copied for the Moto Morini Dart 400 and Cagiva Freccia 125. Together with Tamburini's Bimota DB1, they were enormously influential in terms of styling.

=== 1990s ===
In 1993, Miguel Angel Galluzzi introduced the Ducati Monster, a naked bike with exposed trellis and engine. Today the Monster accounts for almost half of the company's worldwide sales. The Monster has undergone the most changes of any motorcycle that Ducati has ever produced.

In 1993, Pierre Terblanche, Massimo Bordi, and Claudio Domenicali designed the Ducati Supermono. A 550 cc single-cylinder lightweight "Catalog Racer". Only 67 were built between 1993 and 1997.

In 1994, the company introduced the Ducati 916 model designed by Massimo Tamburini, a water-cooled version that allowed for higher output levels and a striking new bodywork that had aggressive lines, an underseat exhaust, and a single-sided swingarm. Ducati has since ceased production of the 916, supplanting it (and its progeny, the 748, 996, and 998) with the 749 and 999.

=== 2000s ===
In 2006, the retro-styled Ducati PaulSmart 1000 LE was released, which shared styling cues with the 1973 750 SuperSport (itself a production replica of Paul Smart's 1972 race winning 750 Imola Desmo), as one of a SportClassic series representing the 750 GT, 750 Sport, and 750 SuperSport Ducati motorcycles.

- Monster: 620, 695, 696, 750, 796, 900, S2R, S4R
- Streetfighter S
- ST2, ST3, ST4
- Paul Smart 1000LE and SportClassic variants
- SuperSport 750, 900, 1000
- 748, 749, 848
- 996, 998, 999, 1098, 1098S, 1098R, 1198
- Desmosedici RR

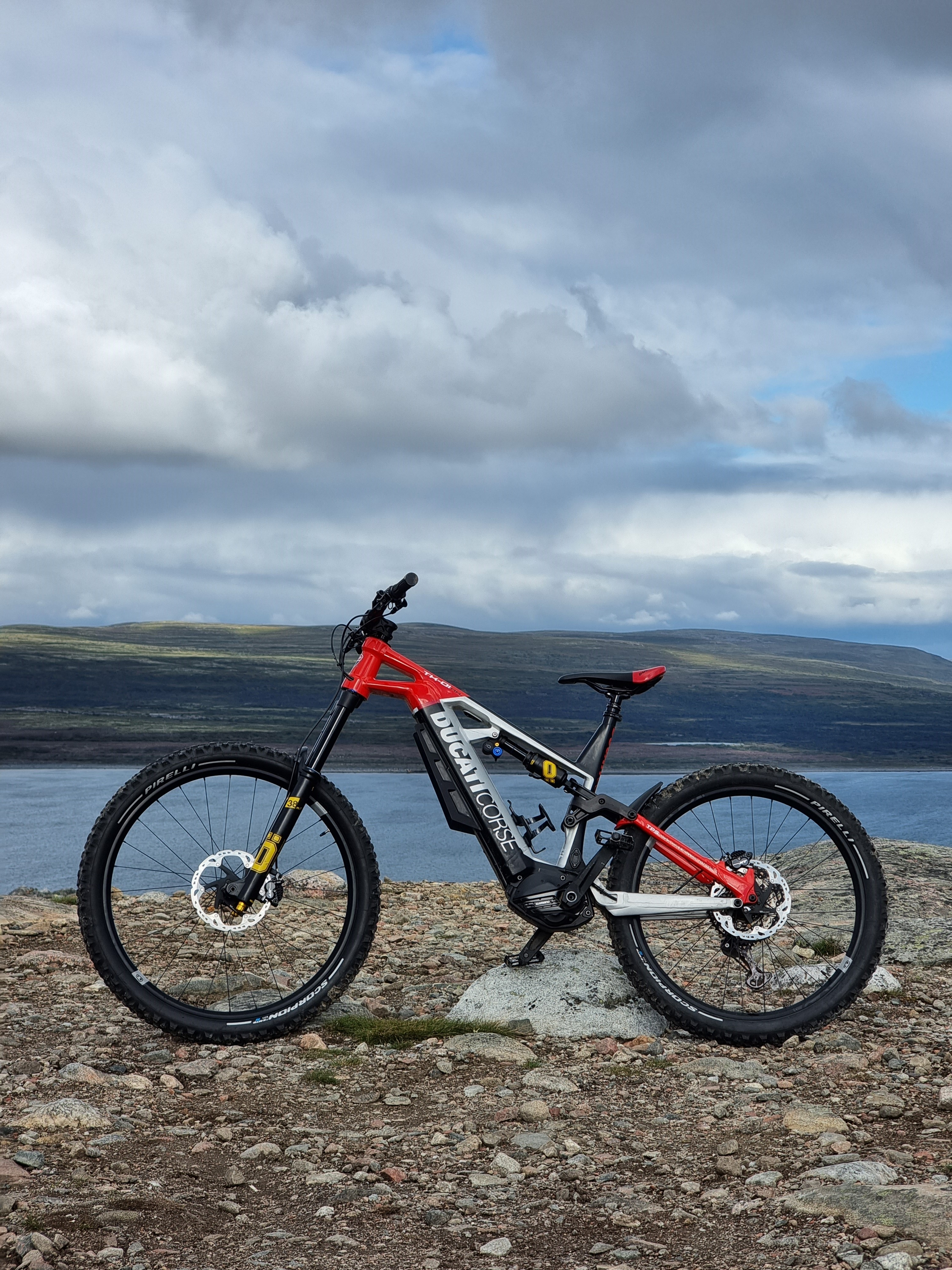
Ducati TK01RR 2021 at Sredniy Peninsula (Russia)

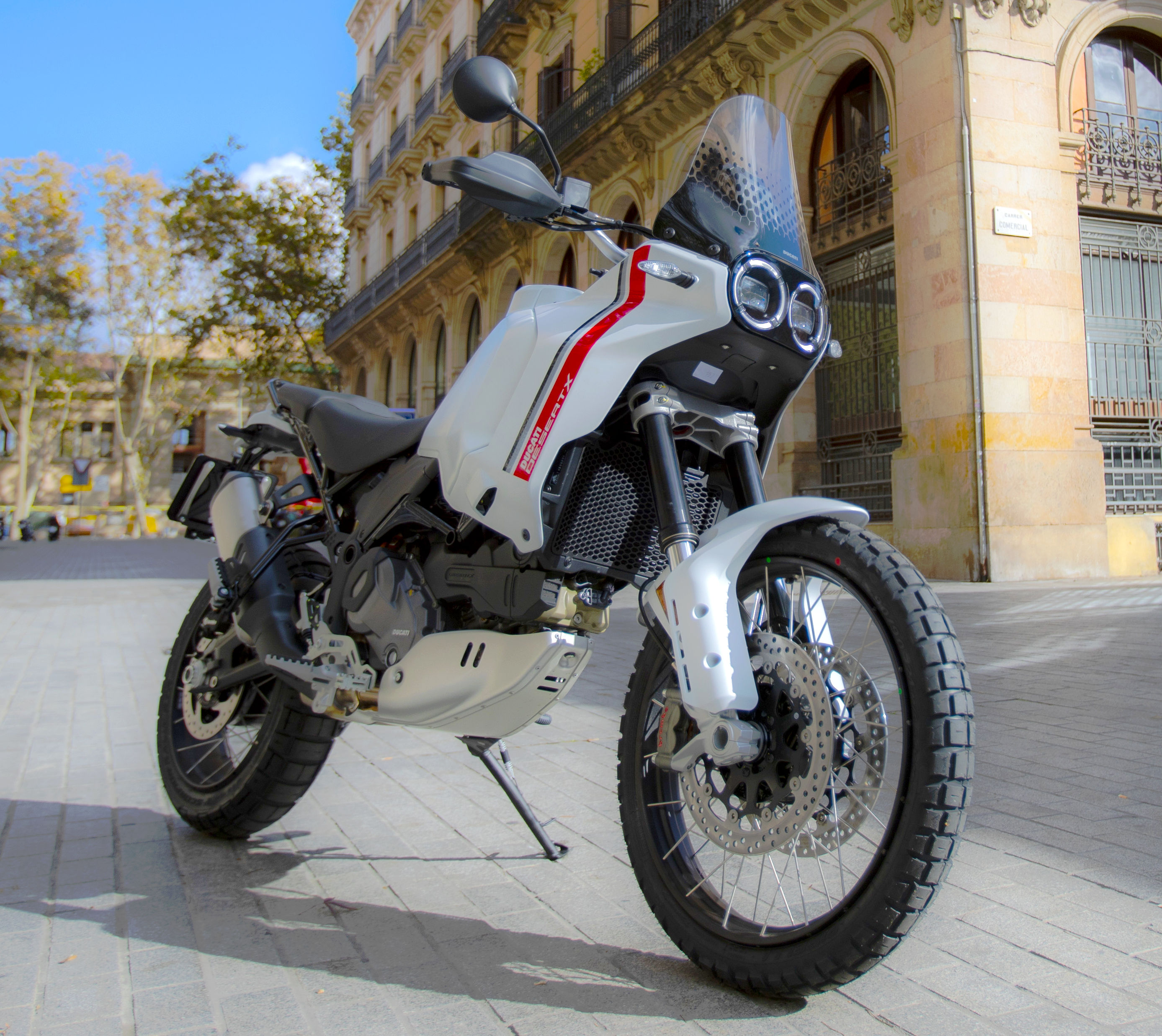
Test ride of Ducati DesertX in Barcelona

== Current lineup ==
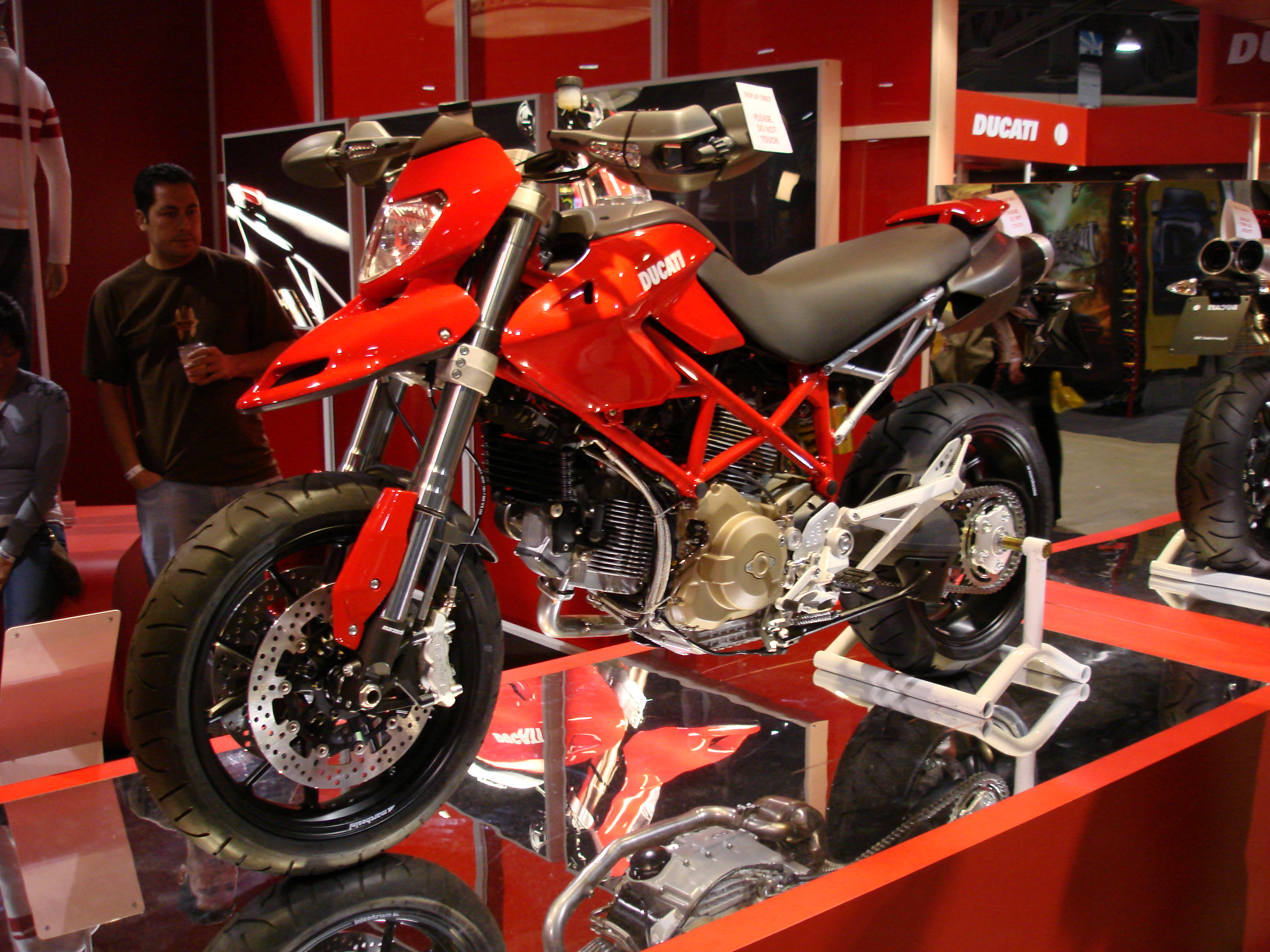
Ducati Hypermotard

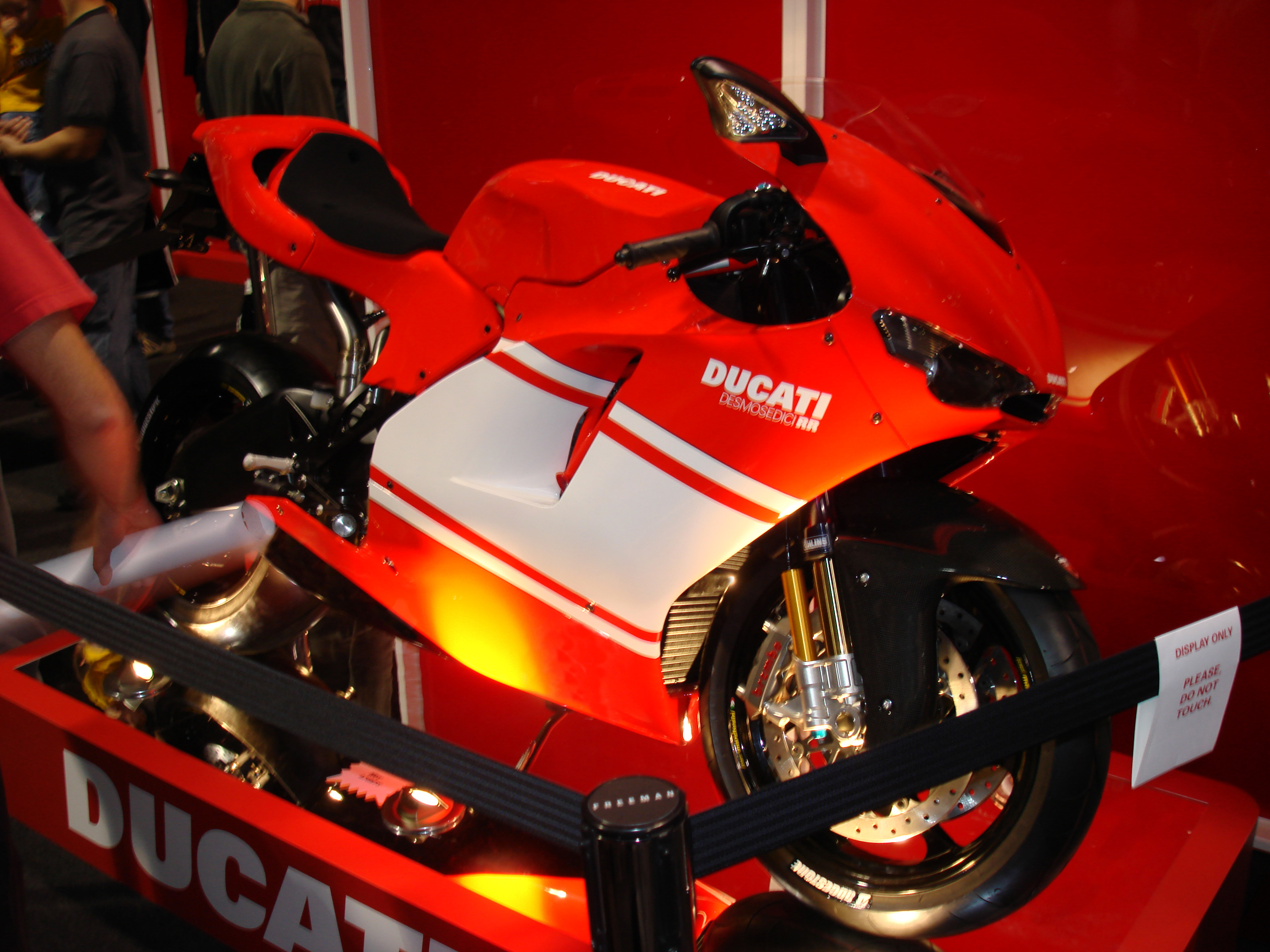
Ducati Desmosedici RR

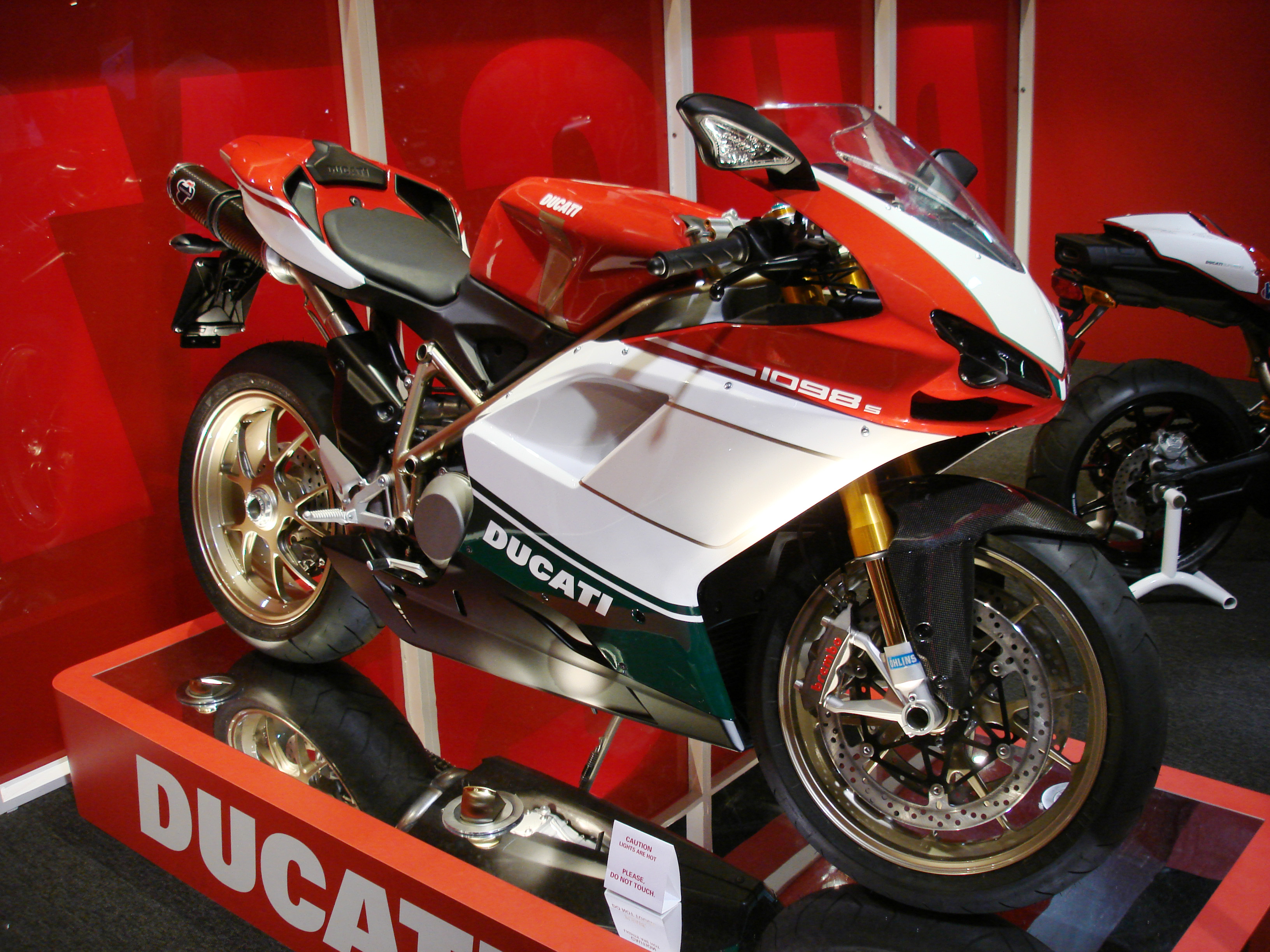
Ducati 1098 S Tricolore

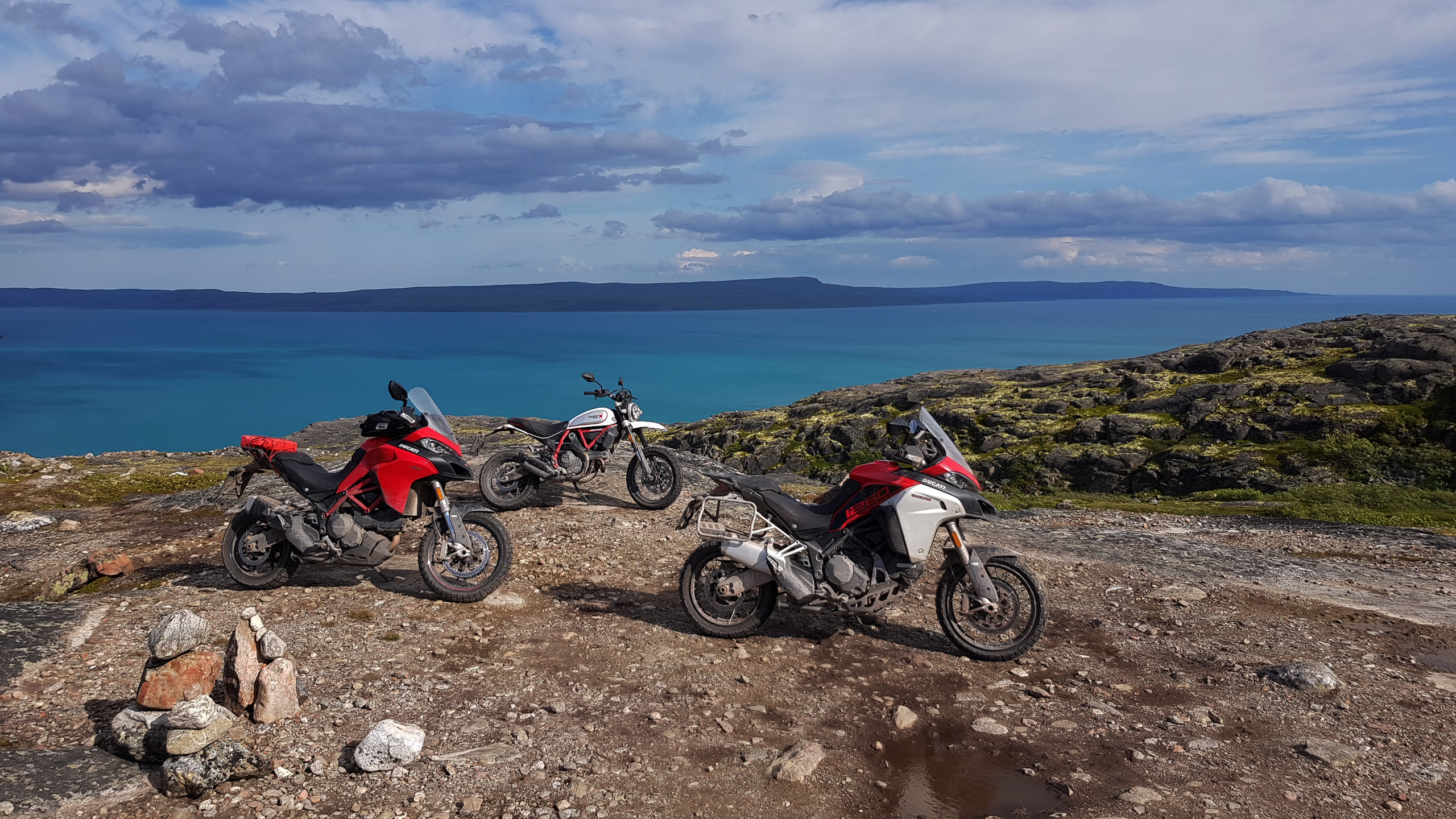
Ducati Multistrada 950 S, Scrambler Desert Sled, Multistrada 1260 Enduro have conquered Kola, Rybachiy & Sredniy peninsulas, Russia

Monster

- Monster
- Monster+
- Monster 821
- Monster 821 Stealth
- Monster 1200
- Monster 1200 S

Multistrada

- Multistrada 950
- Multistrada 950S
- Multistrada V4
- Multistrada V4 S
- Multistrada V4 S Sport
- Multistrada 1260 Enduro

Diavel

- Diavel 1260
- Diavel 1260 S
- Diavel 1260 Lamborghini
- XDiavel
- XDiavel S
- XDiavel Black Star

Panigale

- Panigale 899
- Panigale 959
- Panigale 1199
- Panigale 1299
- Panigale V2
- Panigale V4
- Panigale V4 S
- Panigale V4 SP
- Panigale V4 R
- Superleggera V4

Streetfighter

- Streetfighter V4
- Streetfighter V4 S
- Streetfighter V2

SuperSport

- SuperSport
- SuperSport S

Hypermotard

- Hypermotard 950
- Hypermotard 950 SP
- Hypermotard 950 RVE

Scrambler

- Scrambler 1100 Pro
- Scrambler 1100 Sport Pro
- Scrambler 1100 Dark Pro
- Scrambler Nightshift
- Scrambler Full Throttle
- Scrambler Café Racer
- Scrambler Desert Sled
- Scrambler Icon
- Scrambler Icon Dark
- Scrambler Sixty2

Ducati DesertX

- DesertX

Ducati Desmo450

- Desmo450 MX
- Desmo450 EDX
- Desmo450 EDS

== Product design ==
Ducati is best known for high-performance motorcycles characterized by large-capacity four-stroke, 90° V-twin engines, with a desmodromic valve design.

=== Designer ===
The chief designer of most Ducati motorcycles in the 1950s was Fabio Taglioni (1920–2001).

His designs ranged from the small single-cylinder machines that were successful in the Italian 'street races' to the large-capacity twins of the 1980s.

Taglioni used the Cavallino Rampante (identified with the Ferrari brand) on his Ducati motorbikes. He chose this emblem of courage and daring as a sign of respect and admiration for Francesco Baracca, a World War I fighter pilot who died during an air raid in 1918.

=== Engine ===
Ducati has produced several styles of motorcycle engines, including varying the number of cylinders, type of valve actuation, and fuel delivery.

Ducati introduced the Pantah in 1979; its engine was updated in the 1990s in the Ducati Supersport (SS) series. All modern Ducati engines are derivatives of the Pantah, which uses a toothed belt to actuate the engine's valves.

Ducati is best known for its 90° V-twin engine, used on nearly all Ducatis since the 1970s. Ducati brands its engine as "L-twin", emphasizing the 90° V angle, to create product differentiation from competing V-twin motorcycles. As one cylinder is vertical while the other is horizontal, it looks like the letter "L".

==== Past variations ====
Ducati has also made other engine types, mostly before the 1970s.

Those engines had one, two, three, or four cylinders; operated by pull rod valves and push rod valves; single, double, and triple overhead camshafts; two-stroke and even at one stage manufactured small diesel engines, many were used to power boats, generators, garden machinery and emergency pumps (for example, for fire fighting).

The engines were the IS series from 7 to 22 hp (5.2 to 16.4 kW) air-cooled and the larger twin DM series water- and air-cooled. The engines have been found in all parts of the globe. Wisconsin Diesel even assembled and "badge engineered" the engines in the USA. They have also produced outboard motors for marine use.

From the 1960s to the 1990s, the Spanish company MotoTrans licensed Ducati engines and produced motorcycles that, although they incorporated subtle differences, were clearly Ducati-derived. MotoTrans's most notable machine was the 250 cc 24 Horas (Spanish for "24 hours").

Currently, Ducati makes no other engines except for its motorcycles.

=== Desmodromic valve ===
Ducati is also famous for using the desmodromic valve system championed by engineer and designer Fabio Taglioni, though the firm has also used engines that use valve springs to close their valves.

Desmodromic valves are closed with a separate, dedicated cam lobe and lifter instead of the conventional valve springs used in most internal combustion engines in consumer vehicles.

This allows the cams to have a more radical profile, thus opening and closing the valves more quickly without the risk of valve-float, which causes a loss of power that is likely when using a "passive" closing mechanism under the same conditions.

On current Ducati motors, except for the Desmosedici and 1199 Panigale, the valves are actuated by a standard valve cam shaft which is rotated by a timing belt driven by the motor directly. The teeth on the belt keep the camshaft drive pulleys indexed.

==== Past variants ====
On older Ducati motors, prior to 1986, drive was by solid shaft that transferred to the camshaft through bevel-cut gears. This method of valve actuation was used on many of Ducati's older single-cylinder motorcycles — the shaft tube is visible on the outside of the cylinder.

In the early days, Ducati reserved the desmodromic valve heads for its higher performance bikes and its race bikes. These valves do not suffer from valve float at high engine speeds, thus a desmodromic engine is capable of far higher revolutions than a similarly configured engine with traditional spring-valve heads.

=== Dry clutches ===
While most other manufacturers use wet clutches (with the spinning parts bathed in oil) Ducati previously used multiplate dry clutches in many of their motorcycles.

The dry clutch eliminates the power loss from oil viscosity drag on the engine, even though the engagement may not be as smooth as the oil-bath versions, but the clutch plates can wear more rapidly. Additionally, draining engine oil isn't required to gain access to and disassemble the clutch as it is with wet clutches.

Ducati has converted to wet clutches across their current product lines.

=== Others ===
Ducati also extensively uses a trellis frame, although Ducati's MotoGP project broke with this tradition by introducing a revolutionary carbon fibre frame for the Ducati Desmosedici GP9.

== Marketing ==
As of 2009, Ducati was still pursuing the "win on Sunday, sell on Monday" business model and spending 10% of company revenues, 40 million, on its racing business.

=== Enthusiasts groups ===
A key part of Ducati's marketing strategy since the 1990s has been fostering a distinct community identity in connection with branding efforts including online communities and local, regional, and national Ducati enthusiast clubs.

==== In the USA ====
There are more than 400 Ducati clubs worldwide and 20,000 registered users of the Ducati Owners Club web site and 17,000 subscribers to the racing web site. Enthusiasts and riders are informally referred to in the motorcycling community as Ducatista (singular) or Ducatisti (plural).

In North America, there are several Ducati enthusiasts organizations with varying degrees of factory sponsorship, such as the Bay Area Desmo Owners Club (BADOC) located in and around the city of San Francisco, CA. Ducati Riders of Illinois (DRILL) located in Chicago, IL. DESMO, the Ducati Enthusiast Sport Motorcycle Organization, is a North American group affiliated with the factory Desmo Owners Club.

Some groups are focused on vintage Ducatis while several are based primarily or entirely on email discussion lists or web forums.

=== Merchandising ===
Ducati has a wide range of accessories, lifestyle products and co-branded merchandise bearing their logos and designs.

The company has a licensing agreement with Tumi Inc., launching a collection of eight co-branded luggage pieces in 2006, sold through both of the brands' retail outlets.

== Racing ==
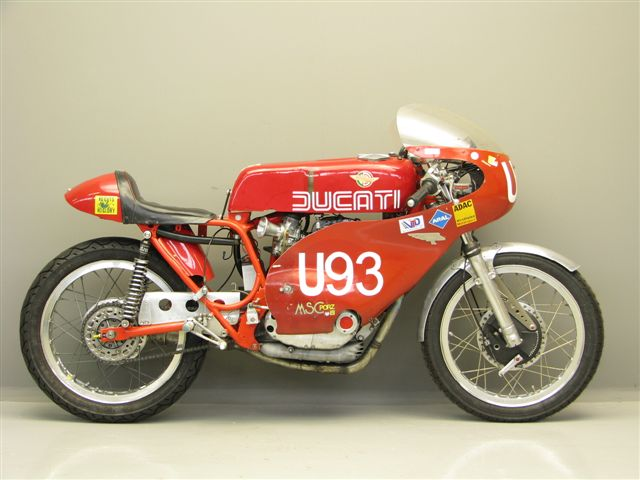
A Ducati racing motorcycle from 1968

Ducati rejoined Grand Prix motorcycle racing in 2003, after a 30-year absence.

On 23 September 2007, Casey Stoner clinched his and Ducati's first Grand Prix World Championship. And 15 years later, Francesco Bagnaia became the Italian manufacturer's second-ever MotoGP champion.

Nine-time world champion Valentino Rossi rode for Ducati Corse for 2011 and 2012.

| Year | Champion | Motorcycle |
|---|---|---|
| 2007 | (Australia) Casey Stoner | Ducati Desmosedici GP7 |
| 2022 | (Italy) Francesco Bagnaia | Ducati Desmosedici GP22 |
| 2023 | (Italy) Francesco Bagnaia | Ducati Desmosedici GP23 |
| 2024 | (Spain) Jorge Martín* | Ducati Desmosedici GP24 |
| 2025 | (Spain) Marc Márquez | Ducati Desmosedici GP25 |

Aside from MotoGP, Ducati has also deployed teams in various motorcycle racing competitions.

* Jorge Martín raced in the Ducati satellite team Prima Pramac Racing.

== See also ==
- List of companies of Italy
- List of motorcycle manufacturers
