= Ducati DesertX =

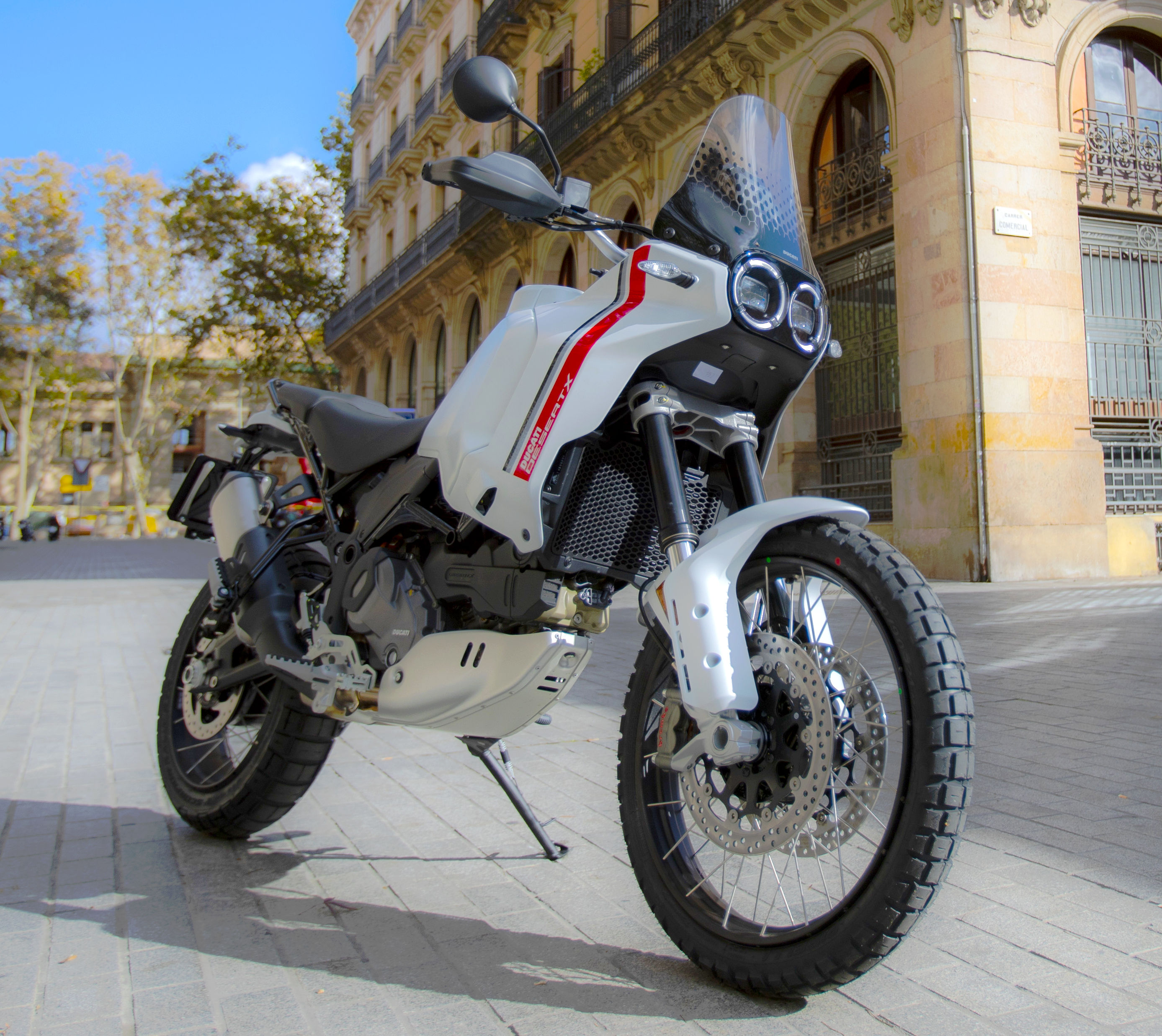
- Manufacturer: Ducati
- Production: 2022
- Class: dual-purpose
- Engine: Liquid cooled 90° 937 cc (57.2 cu in) V-twin, 4-valve/cyl desmodromic
- Bore / stroke: 94 mm × 67.5 mm (3.70 in × 2.66 in)
- Compression ratio: 13.3:1
- Power: Claimed: 110 hp (82 kW) @ 10,750 rpm
- Torque: Claimed: 92 N⋅m (68 lbf⋅ft) @ 9,000 rpm
- Transmission: 6 speed, wet multi-plate, chain drive, manual
- Frame type: Tubular steel trellis
- Suspension: Front: Fully adjustable 46mm Kayaba forks, 9.1 in (230 mm) travel Rear: Fully adjustable Kayaba monoshock 8.7 in (220 mm) travel
- Brakes: Front: Brembo radial monobloc calipers, 2×330 mm (13 in) discs Rear: 265 mm (10.4 in) disc, ABS
- Rake, trail: 27.6°/4.8 in.
- Wheelbase: 63.3 in (1,610 mm)
- Seat height: 34.4 in (870 mm)
- Weight: Claimed: 211 kg (465 lb) (dry)
- Fuel capacity: 5.5 gal.
- Related: Cagiva Elefant 900ie

The Ducati DesertX is a 937 cc (57.2 cu in) dual-sport from Ducati, released in 2022. It has a 110-horsepower (82 kW) Testastretta V2 engine. Claimed dry weight is 211 kilograms (465 lb).

== Description ==
Initially presented in prototype form, built on the basis of the contemporary Scrambler at EICMA in 2019, after two years of development it made its definitive debut in December 2021, and was then introduced on the market in May 2022. The DesertX explicitly recalls the stylistic features of the Cagiva Elefant of the 80s and 90s, twice winner of the Paris-Dakar and which, although marketed under the Cagiva brand, was powered by a Ducati twin-cylinder; this because at the time the Borgo Panigale house was owned by the Varese group of the Castiglioni brothers. The same is also evident in the aesthetics of the DesertX, which refers to the Lucky Explorer livery of the Elefant. The bike was designed by Jérémy Faraud.

It is equipped with the 11° liquid-cooled L-twin Testastretta engine with desmodromic distribution with 8 valves (4 for each cylinder) powered by an indirect electronic injection system, placed in a transverse position with a displacement of 937 cm^{3}, which in this version it has liquid-cooled and with desmodromic distribution, which delivers 110 HP at 9,250 rpm and 92 Nm of torque at 6,500 rpm. The weight stands at 211 kg. The transmission is entrusted to a six-speed gearbox with a chain.

The frame is a classic trellis in perimeter steel tubes, a front trellis to support the head and a reinforcing handkerchief where the swingarm is anchored, equipped with a front suspension with 46 mm upside-down forks with 230 mm of wheel travel. Kayaba, while at the rear there is a classic aluminum swingarm anchored to a central shock absorber. The Brembo braking system consists of a double semi-floating disc with a diameter of 320 mm with four-piston calipers at the front and a single 265 mm double-piston disc equipped with ABS at the rear. Tubeless tires measuring 90/90-21 in front and 150/70 R18 in the rear are shod on spoked rims.
