= Kevin Ash =

British motorcycle journalist and author (1959–2013)

- Born: Kevin Charles Ash; 10 December 1959; Ilford, United Kingdom
- Died: 22 January 2013 (aged 53); George, Western Cape, South Africa
- Cause of death: Motorcycle accident
- Occupations: Journalist, writer
- Spouse: Caroline Quanjer (m. 1990)
- Website: ashonbikes.com

Kevin Ash (10 December 1959 – 22 January 2013) was a British motorcycle journalist and author, who contributed to The Daily Telegraph and to Motor Cycle News.

Covering technical as well as topical issues, Ash was described as "one of the key figures of the British motorcycle scene", "one of the world's leading motorcycle journalists", and "the doyen of motorcycle correspondents."

== Personal life ==
Ash was born in Ilford, a town in north-east London, part of Greater London administrative area. He attended Ipswich School, then studied engineering at Imperial College. In 1990, he married Caroline Quanjer, of the Netherlands, with whom he had three daughters: Laurien, Kirsten and Ingrid, who were 20, 18 and 10 at the time of his death.

== Career ==
Before becoming a journalist, Ash was a motorcycle courier. He also participated in sidecar racing. In 1991, he was a founding contributor at the magazine Fast Bikes.

He then joined Motor Cycle News (MCN) as a road tester in 1993, following a road traffic accident involving a car and a BMW K1100RS ridden by (then) MCN road editor Chris Dabbs, who suffered life-changing injuries. Ash progressed to assistant editor until leaving in 1997 to become a freelance writer.

As a freelancer, he contributed to The Daily Telegraph for 15 years as its motorcycling correspondent.

Ash authored several motorcycle-related books, including BMW Motorcycles: The Evolution of Excellence and Ducati People: Looking into the Lives of the Men and Women Behind This Legendary Marque. He also authored a guide, Going Dutch, in the late 1990s on the parallel import of right-hand drive cars to the United Kingdom from other countries in the European Union.

== Death ==
There are moments on bikes when you're concentrating so intently on the moment, the rest of the world, life, worries, memories are all pushed out of your mind as you focus on the now. There's no such thing as perfect happiness, but on two wheels, these can get close.
– Kevin Ash, 2011 Interview, Bike Exif

Ash was involved in a fatal motorcycle crash near George, Western Cape in South Africa, during a press test ride at the launch of the 2013 BMW R1200GS.

Ash crashed his R1200GS motorcycle during one of BMW's six scheduled press launch trips that included a total of 60 to 70 journalists, while passing through Baviaanskloof Mega Reserve on a gravel road between Willowmore and Patensie. UK motorcycle journalist Alun Davies, following directly behind Ash on another motorcycle, either struck or narrowly avoided striking (reports vary) the fallen Ash and his motorcycle, which straddled the route. Davies was treated at a hospital for a dislocated shoulder and other injuries and discharged several days later.

BMW engineers from Germany were brought to South Africa to investigate all the test motorcycles. As of April 2013 investigators have neither announced a connection between a possible problem with the motorcycle and the crash nor released formal details of the accident or investigation.

== Works ==
- Kevin Ash, ed. (1999). Bikes of the Millennium. EMAP Active. ASIN B000S37BOM.
- Ash, Kevin (2000). New Illustrated Encyclopedia of Motorcycles. Greenwich Editions. ISBN 978-0862882730.
- Ash, Kevin (2002). Ducati People: Looking Into the Lives of the Men and Women Behind this Legendary Marque. Haynes. ISBN 978-1859606865.
- Ash, Kevin (2006). BMW Motorcycles: The Evolution of Excellence. Haynes. ISBN 978-1884313578.
- Ash, Kevin (2007). The Illustrated Encyclopedia of Motorcycles. Oceana. ISBN 978-1845733520.
