= Ducati Panigale =

Italian sports motorcycle

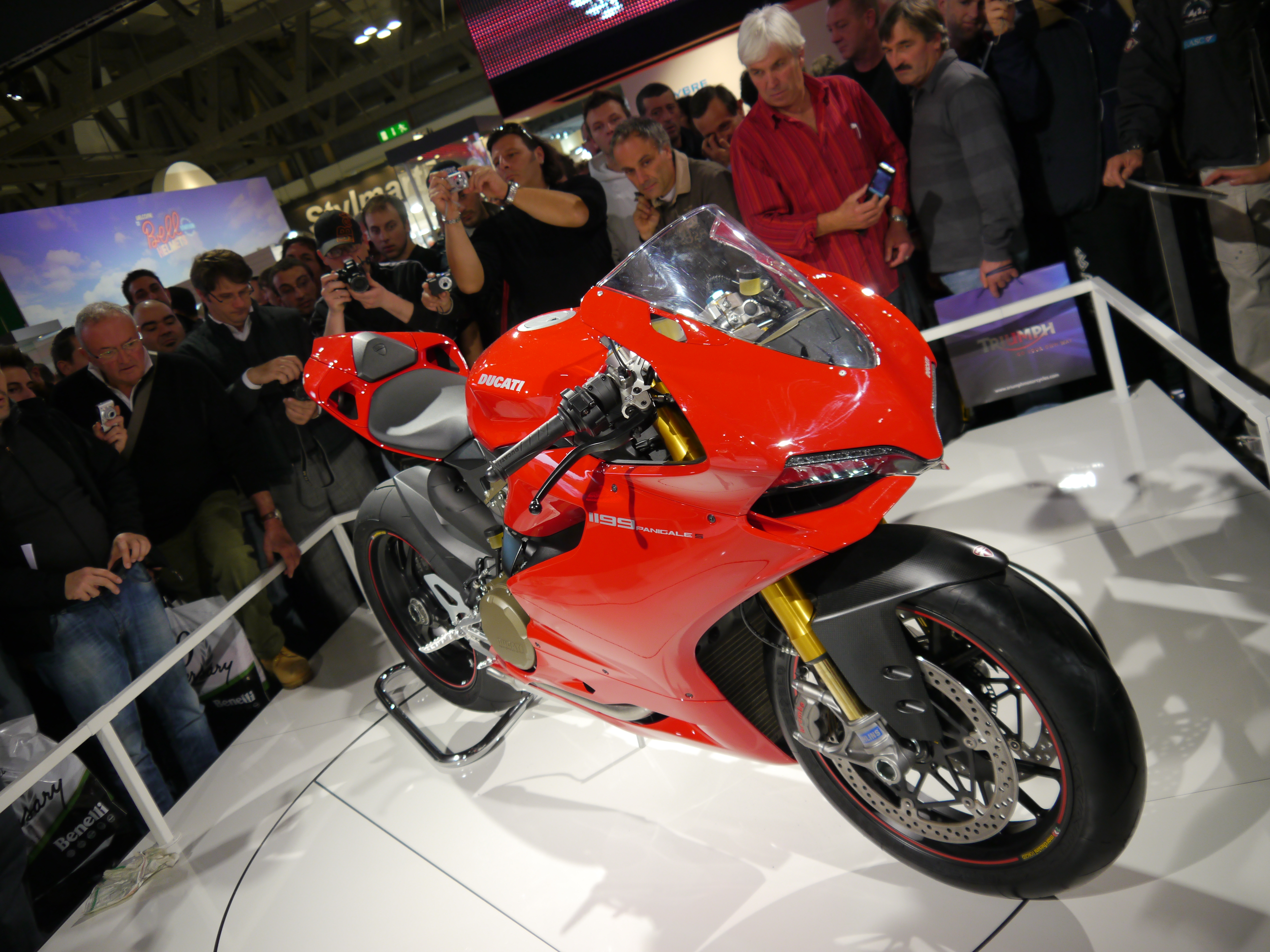
- Ducati 1199 Panigale S
- Manufacturer: Ducati
- Production: 2011–present
- Class: Sport bike

The Ducati Panigale is a family of sport motorcycles manufactured by Ducati since 2011. The Panigale is named after the small manufacturing town of Borgo Panigale. All motorcycles of this series use monocoque frame (the engine is a stressed member, replacing Ducati's conventional trellis frame).

- 899 Panigale, 2013–2015
- 959 Panigale, 2016–2020
- Panigale V2, 2020–present
- 1199 Panigale, 2012–2014
- 1299 Panigale, 2015–2018
- Panigale V4, 2018–present
