= Ducati Streetfighter =

Streetfighter motorcycle

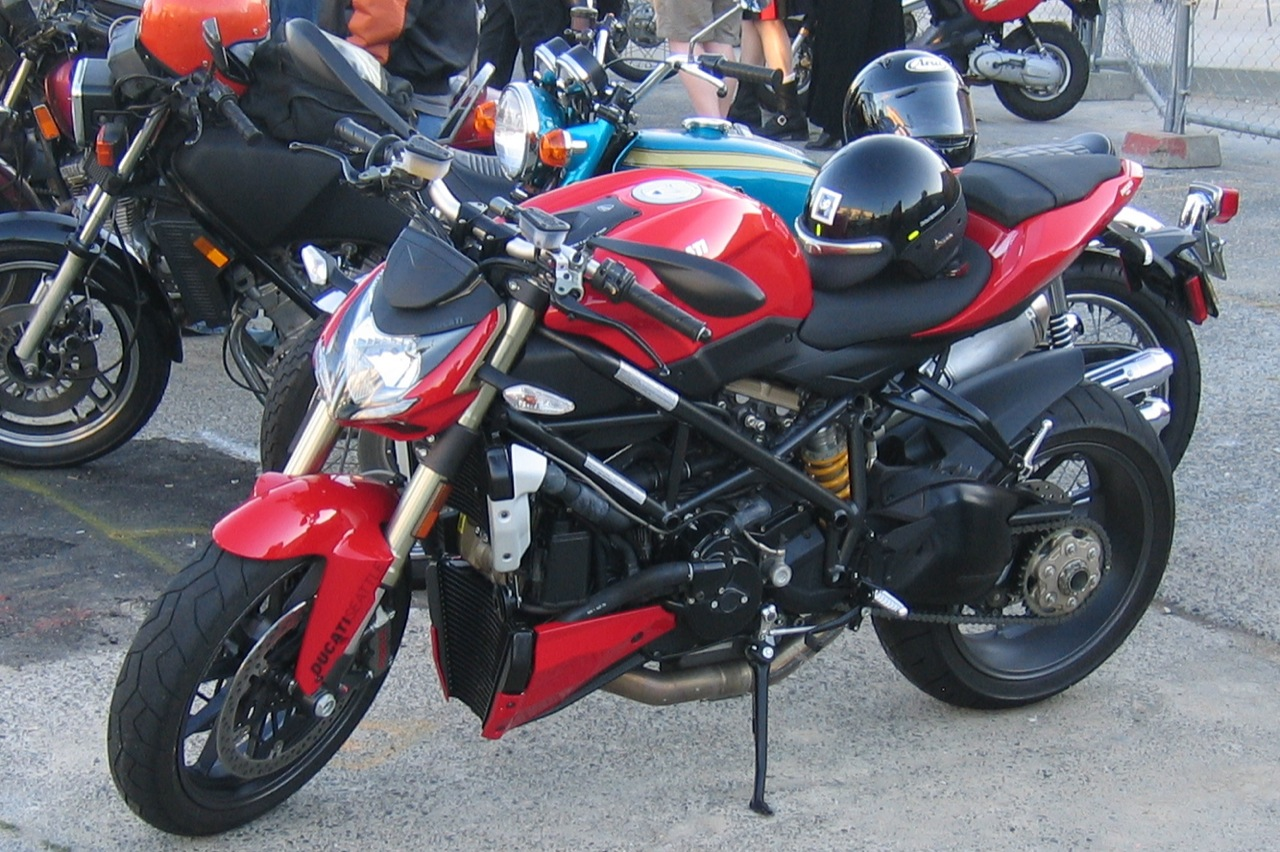
- Manufacturer: Ducati Motor Holding
- Production: 2009-present
- Class: Streetfighter
- Engine: 1,099 cc (67.1 cu in) 90° L-twin, DOHC, 8v desmodromic, Marelli EFI
- Bore / stroke: 104.0 mm × 64.7 mm (4.09 in × 2.55 in)
- Compression ratio: 12.5:1
- Power: 155 bhp (116 kW) @ 9500 rpm (claimed) 1099 cc 132 bhp (98 kW) @ 10000 rpm (claimed) 849 cc
- Torque: 87.5 lb⋅ft (118.6 N⋅m) @ 9500 rpm (claimed) 1099 cc 69 lb⋅ft (94 N⋅m) @ 9500 rpm (claimed) 849 cc
- Transmission: Dry, multi-plate clutch, 6-speed gearbox
- Suspension: Front: 43mm Ohlins inverted fork with adjustable spring preload, compression and rebound damping Rear: Single Ohlins shock with adjustable spring preload, compression and rebound damping
- Brakes: Front: Four-piston Brembo Monobloc radial calipers, 330mm discs Rear: Two-piston Brembo caliper, 245mm disc
- Tires: Front: 120/70ZR-17 Pirelli Diablo Corsa III; Rear: 190/55ZR-17 Pirelli Diablo Corsa III
- Rake, trail: 25.67° 4.5 in.
- Wheelbase: 58.1 in (1,480 mm)
- Seat height: 33 in (840 mm)
- Weight: 368 lb (167 kg) (claimed) (dry)
- Fuel capacity: 4.4 US gal (17 L)

The Ducati Streetfighter is a streetfighter motorcycle produced by Ducati in various iterations since 2009.

== Streetfighter ==
The original Streetfighter model was first unveiled by Ducati at the 2008 EICMA trade show in Milan. The Streetfighter was designed by Damien Basset of the Ducati design team and utilized the 1,099cc liquid-cooled 90° V-twin Testrastretta engine shared with the Ducati 1098 sport bike model. Compared to the 1098, the Streetfighter produced 5 fewer horsepower, due to a different airbox. In addition to the lack of fairing, the Streetfighter differed from the sport bike in that it had a longer swingarm and therefore a longer wheelbase, as well as wider handlebars.

In addition to the standard model, an upgraded Streetfighter S was available, equipped with Öhlins suspension components, Marchesini forged wheels and parts made of carbon fibre-reinforced plastic.

With the launch of the Streetfighter 848, the base model was discontinued after 2011, while the Streetfighter S remained in production until 2013.

== Streetfighter 848 ==
After two years in production, the Streetfighter was supplemented in 2011 by a smaller model, the Streetfighter 848 with the engine from the Ducati 848 sportbike, an 849cc version of the Testastretta engine, whose valve overlap was reduced from 37° to 11° to improve rideability. With higher handlebars, wider footrests and a modified seating position, it was aimed at a clientele preferring a less extreme design than that of the larger Streetfighter.

The Streetfighter 848 was named the "Best Middleweight Streetbike" by Cycle World in 2013. French rider Eric Piscione won the inaugural Motorcycle Middleweight Division race at the 2014 Pikes Peak International Hill Climb with the Streetfighter 848.

After production of the Streetfighter S ended in 2013, the Streetfighter 848 was also discontinued after 2015.

== Streetfighter V4 ==
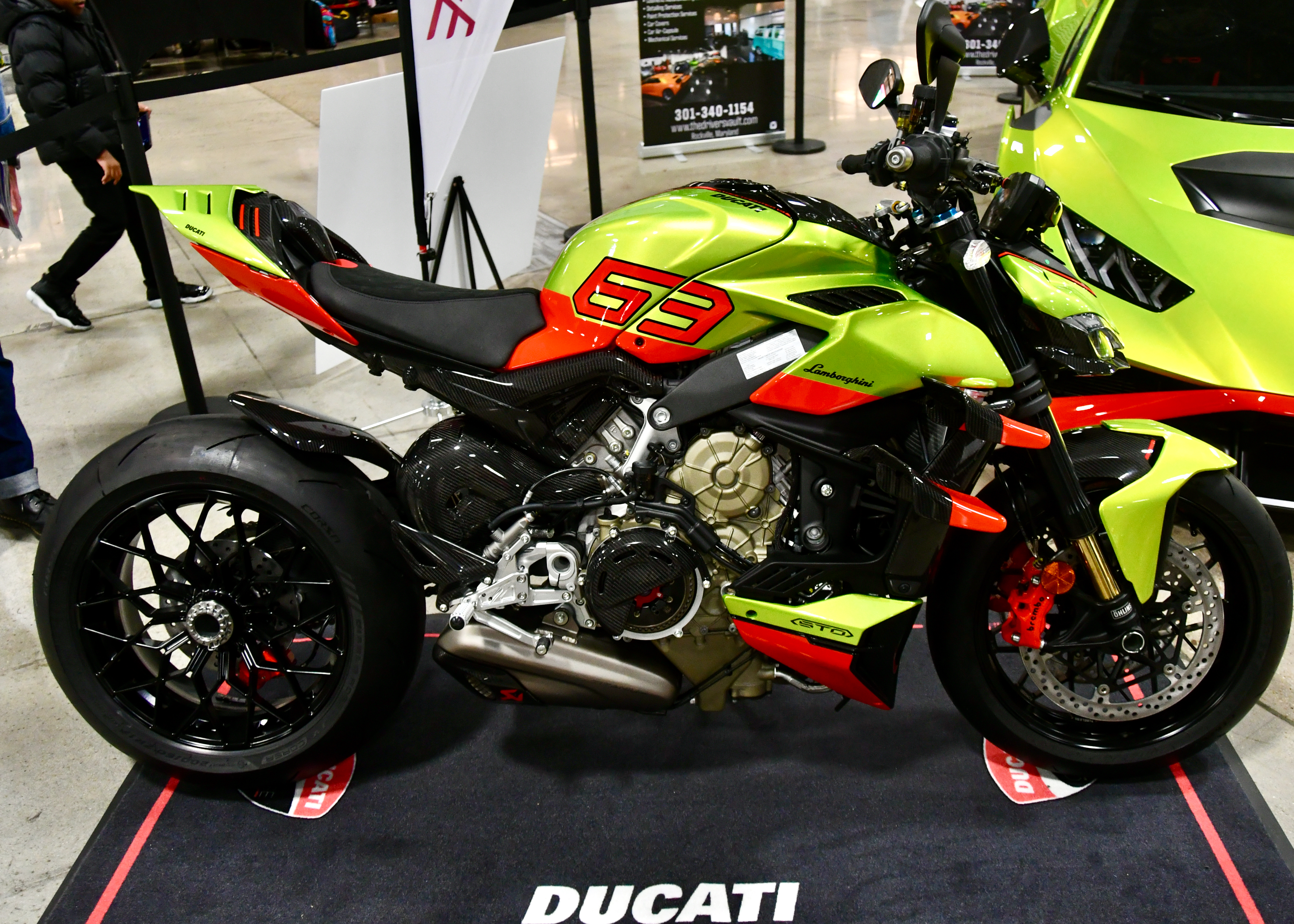
2024 Streetfighter V4

Three weeks before the 2019 EICMA show in Milan, Ducati presented a new Streetfighter V4. As with its technical basis, the Panigale V4 sport bike, it utilizes the Desmosedici Stradale 90° V4 engine with a displacement of 1103 cm^{3}. There is also a quickshift gearshift, eight-stage traction control, various riding modes, wheelie control and a cornering anti-lock braking system. The S version also offers semi-active suspension with Öhlins components. A special feature of the Streetfighter V4 are small additional wings on the side fairings, designed to generate around 150 newtons of downforce at 200 km/h and 280 newtons at 270 km/h.

== Streetfighter V2 ==
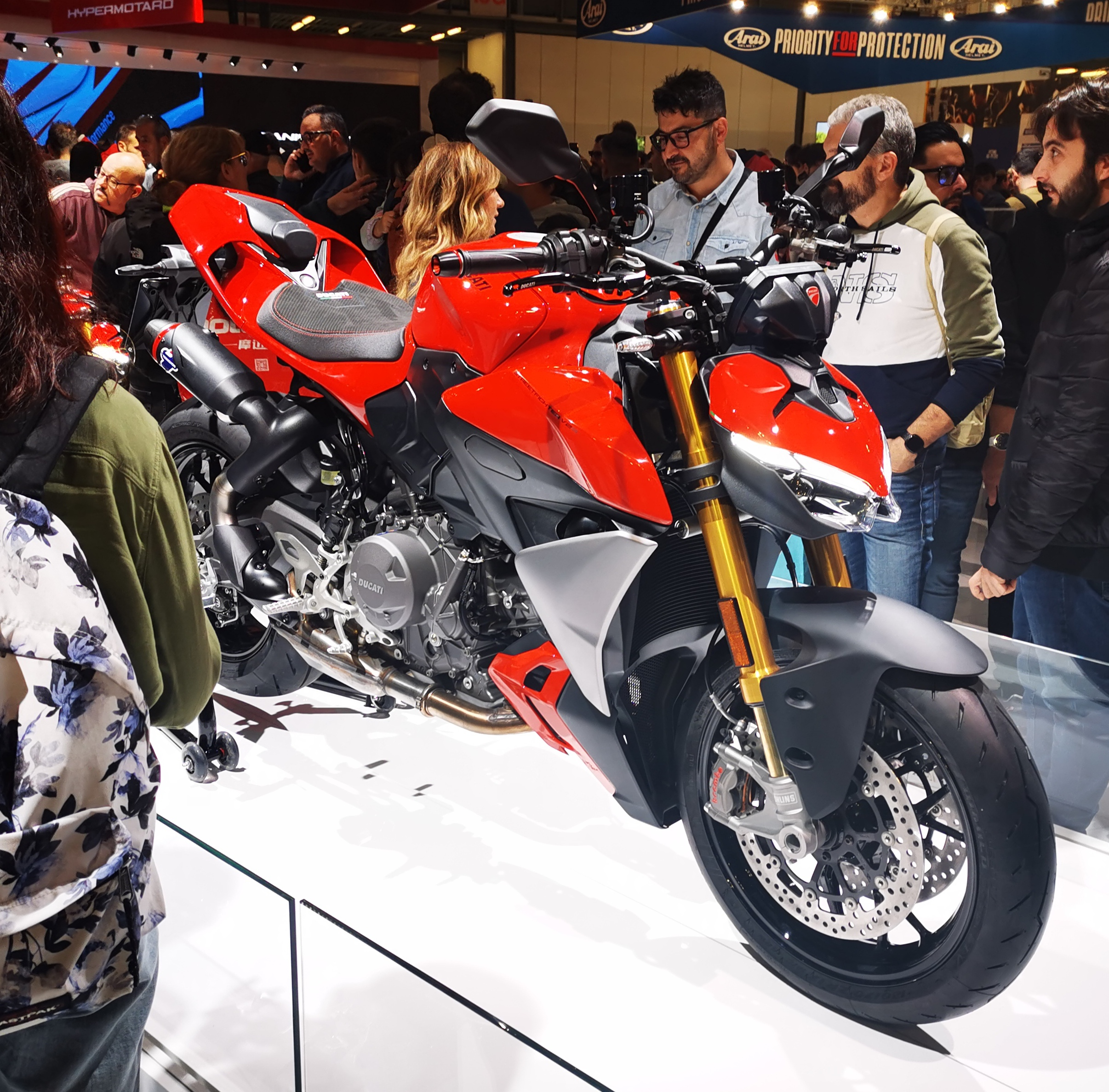
2022 Streetfighter V2

The Streetfighter V2, announced in November 2021 and released for sale in 2022, is modified from the Panigale V2 sport bike. The dry weight of this vehicle is 178 kg and the engine is the 955 cm^{3} Superquadro with 153 hp. The swingarm is 16mm longer than that of its sport bike sister.

== Technical Data ==
Data	Streetfighter	Streetfighter 848	Streetfighter V4	Streetfighter V2	Streetfighter V2
Model years	2009–2013	2011–2015	2020–	2022–2024	2025-
Motor type	Testastretta; liquid-cooled 90° four-stroke V-twin, 4 valves per cylinder, desmodromic valvetrain		Desmosedici Stradale; liquid-cooled 90° four-stroke V4, 4 valves per cylinder, desmodromic valvetrain	Superquadro; liquid-cooled 90° four-stroke V-twin, 4 valves per cylinder, desmodromic valvetrain	Un-named Engine; liquid-cooled 90° four-stroke V-twin, 4 valves per cylinder, Spring Valves
Displacement	1099 cm^{3}	849 cm^{3}	1103 cm^{3}	955 cm^{3}	890 cm^{3}
Bore x stroke	104 mm × 64.7 mm	94 mm × 61.2 mm	81 mm × 53.5 mm	100 mm × 60.8 mm	96 mm x 61.5 mm
Compression ratio	12.5:1	13.2:1	14.0:1	12.5:1	13.1:1
Rated power	114 kW (155 PS) @ 9,500/min	97 kW (132 PS) @ 10,000/min	153 kW (208 PS) @ 12,750/min	112 kW (153 PS) @ 10,750/min	88 kW(120 PS) @ 10,750/min
Max. torque	115 Nm @ 9,500/min	94 Nm @ 9,500/min	123 Nm @ 11,500/min	101 Nm @ 9,000/min	93.3 Nm @ 8250/min
Clutch	hydraulic multi-plate dry clutch	hydraulic multi-plate wet clutch			
Transmission	6 gear transmission				
Wheelbase	1,475 mm		1,488 mm	1,465 mm	1,493 mm
Weight dry / kerb	169 / 199 kg (S: 167 / 197 kg)	169 / 199 kg	180 / 201 kg (S: 178 / 199 kg)	178 / 200 kg	/ 188.5 kg; (S: 185.5 kg)
