= Ducati Superquadro engine =

Ducati Superquadro
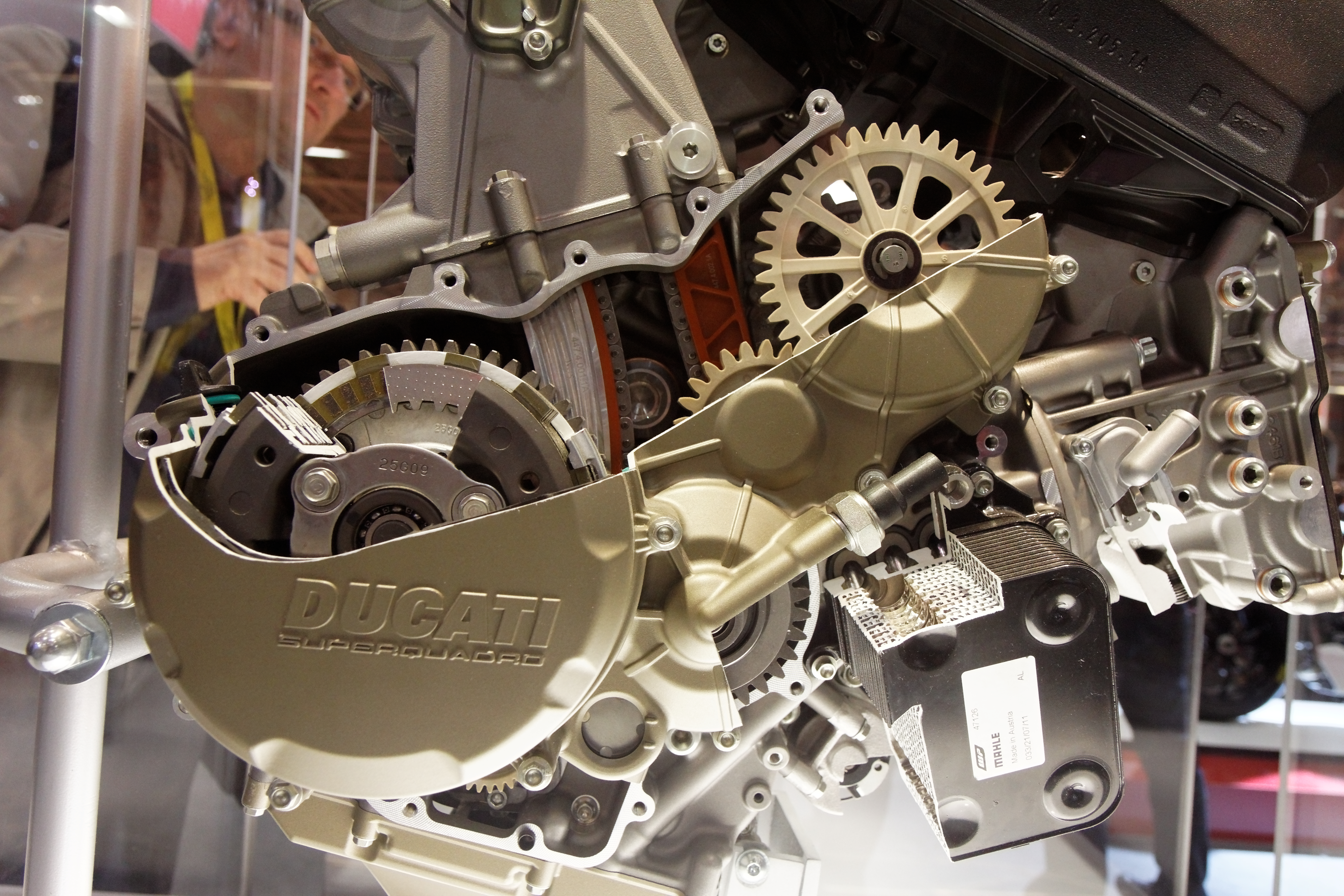

Overview
- Manufacturer: Ducati
- Production: 2011–

Layout
- Configuration: 90° V-twin, four-stroke
- Displacement: 898–1,285 cc (54.8–78.4 cu in)
- Cylinder bore: 100, 112 or 116 mm (3.9, 4.4 or 4.6 in)
- Piston stroke: 57.2 or 60.8 mm (2.25 or 2.39 in)
- Cylinder block material: Aluminium
- Cylinder head material: Aluminium
- Valvetrain: DOHC 4-valve/cyl desmodromic
- Compression ratio: 12.5:1 or 12.6:1

Combustion
- Supercharger: no
- Turbocharger: no
- Fuel system: Fuel injection
- Management: ECU
- Fuel type: Gasoline
- Oil system: Wet sump
- Cooling system: Liquid

Output
- Power output: 1285: 145 kW (194 hp) @ 10,500 rpm
- Specific power: 1285: 112.8 kW/L (2.5 hp/cuin)
- Torque output: 1285: 137 N⋅m (101 lbf⋅ft) @ 9,000 rpm

Emissions
- Emissions target standard: Euro 3, US E2006 Tier 2

The Ducati Superquadro engine is a 90° V-twin four-stroke motorcycle engine made by Ducati since 2011. It has Ducati's signature desmodromic valve system, with four valves per cylinder and gear/chain driven double overhead camshafts. It has been made in four displacements ranging from 898 to 1,285 cc (54.8 to 78.4 cu in), with power as high as 145 kW (194 hp) in the largest version.

The Superquadro engine was first used in the 1,198 cc (73.1 cu in) 1199 Panigale of 2011, with a bore and stroke of 112 mm × 60.8 mm (4.41 in × 2.39 in). This was followed in 2013 by a smaller 898 cc (54.8 cu in), 100 mm × 57.2 mm (3.94 in × 2.25 in) version, used in the 899 Panigale. The successor models, the 1299 Panigale of 2015 and the 959 Panigale of 2016, had the same 60.8 mm (2.39 in) stroke, and bores of either 100 or 116 mm (3.9 or 4.6 in), giving displacements of 1,285 cc (78.4 cu in), and the 955 cc (58.3 cu in).

Unlike the belt-driven overhead cams of earlier Ducati engines the Superquadro's uses gears and a chain. As with most Ducatis, the engine is a stressed member, making the bike smaller and lighter than a conventionally framed motorcycle. The engines are of aluminum with Cermetal bore plating, a hardening process developed by the Italian company Tecnol which is similar to Nikasil. A 1299 version of the engine has been made for the 2017 Ducati 1299 Superleggera model.

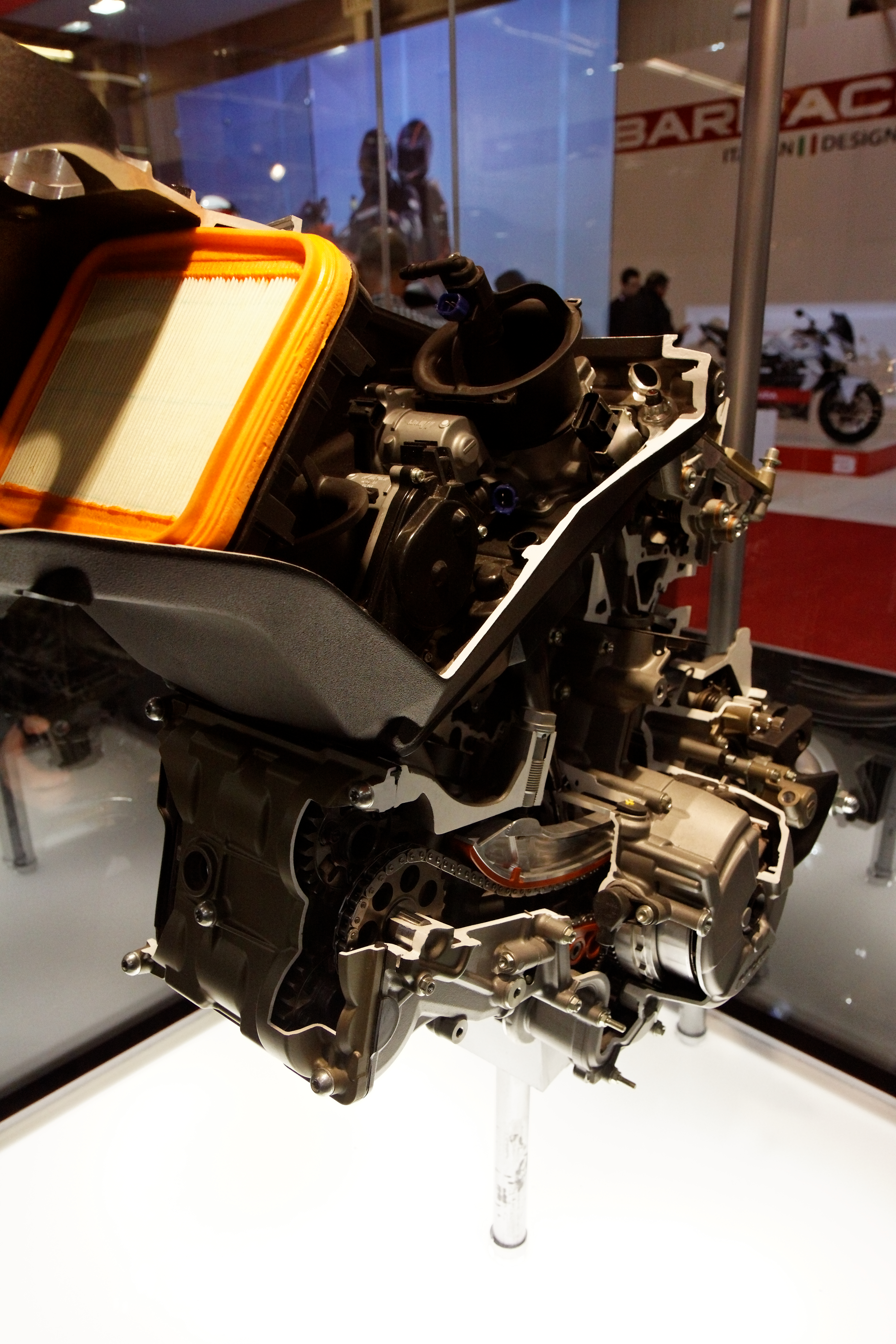

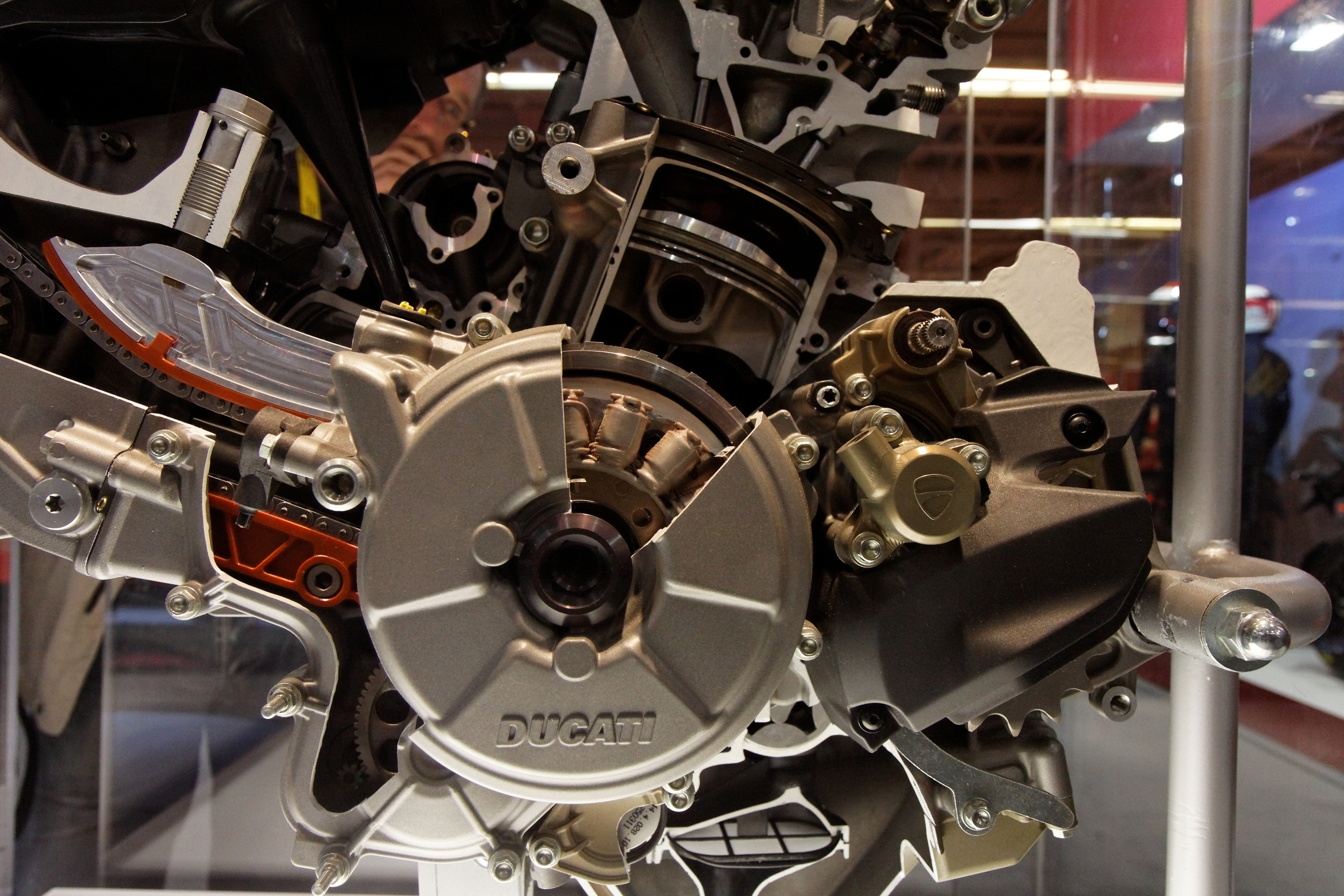

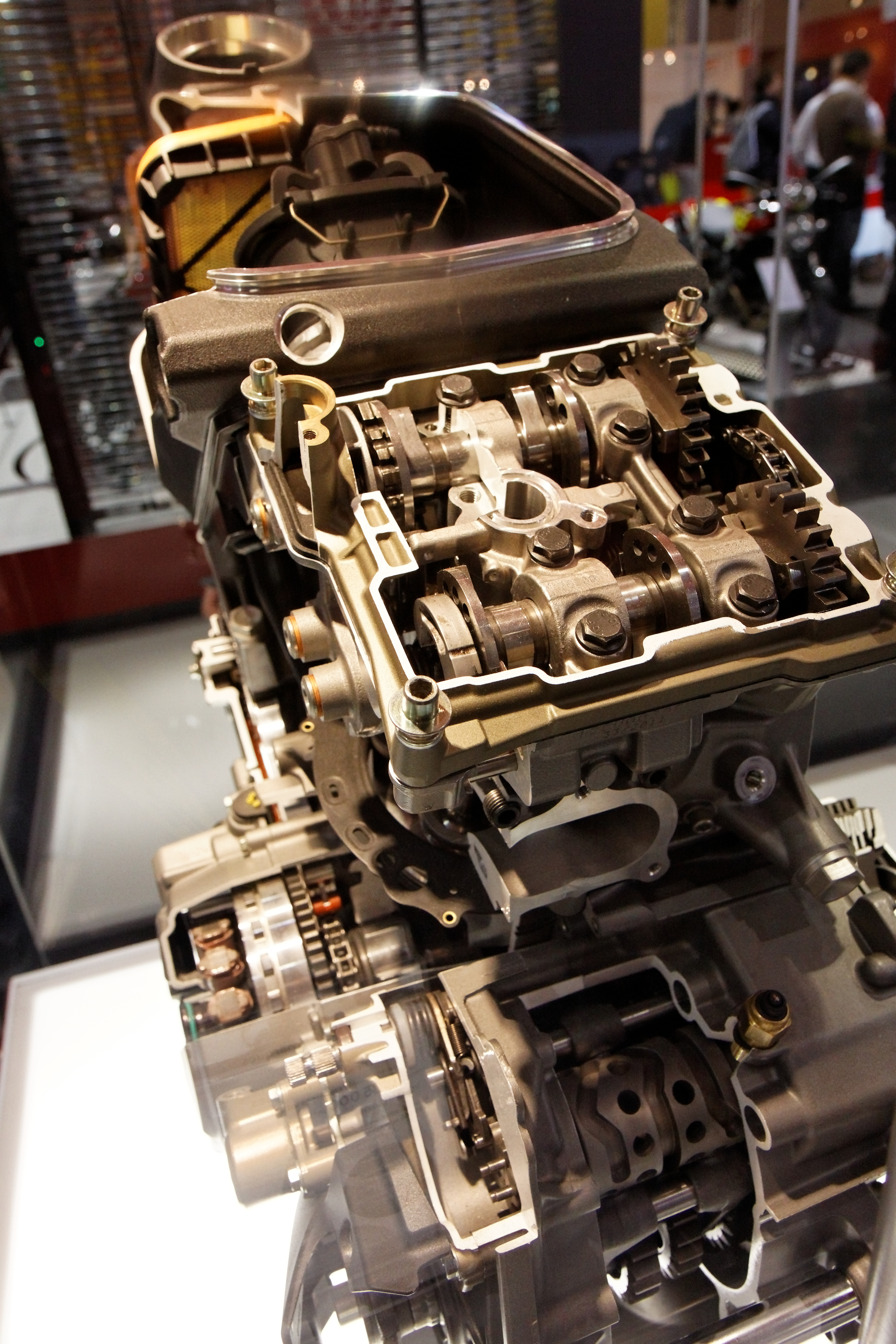

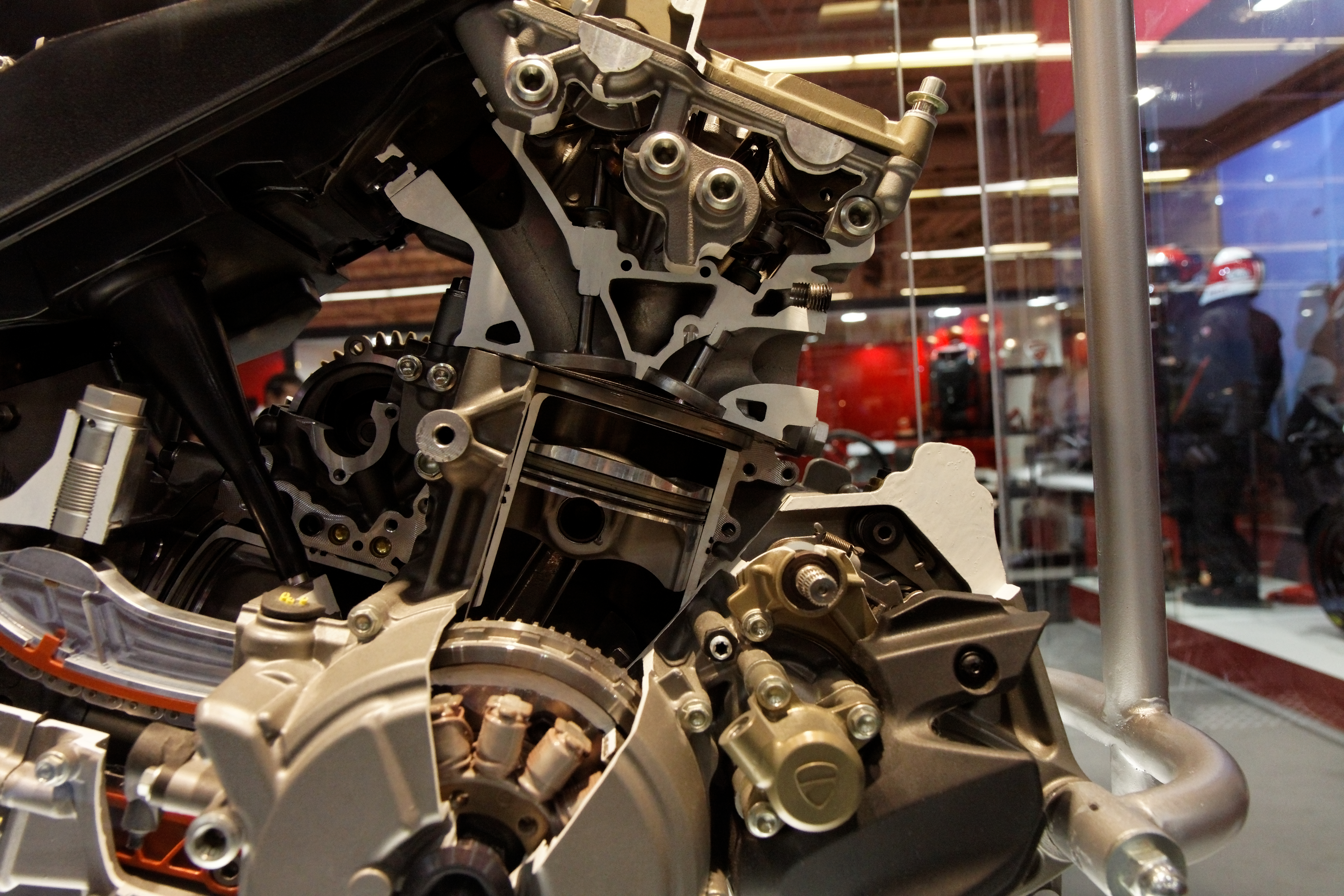
