= Streetfighter (motorcycle) =

Type of sports motorcycle

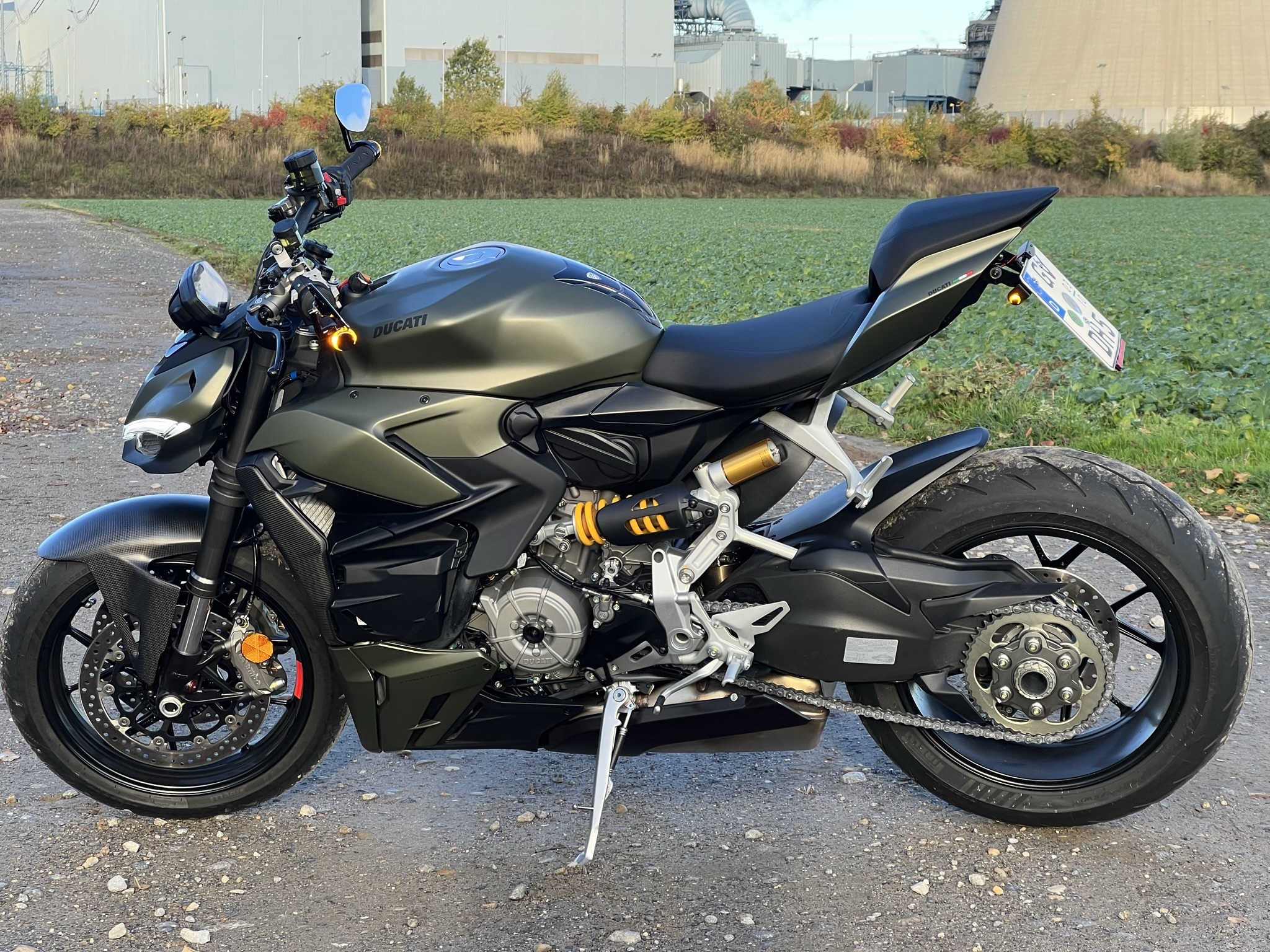
2022 Ducati Streetfighter V2

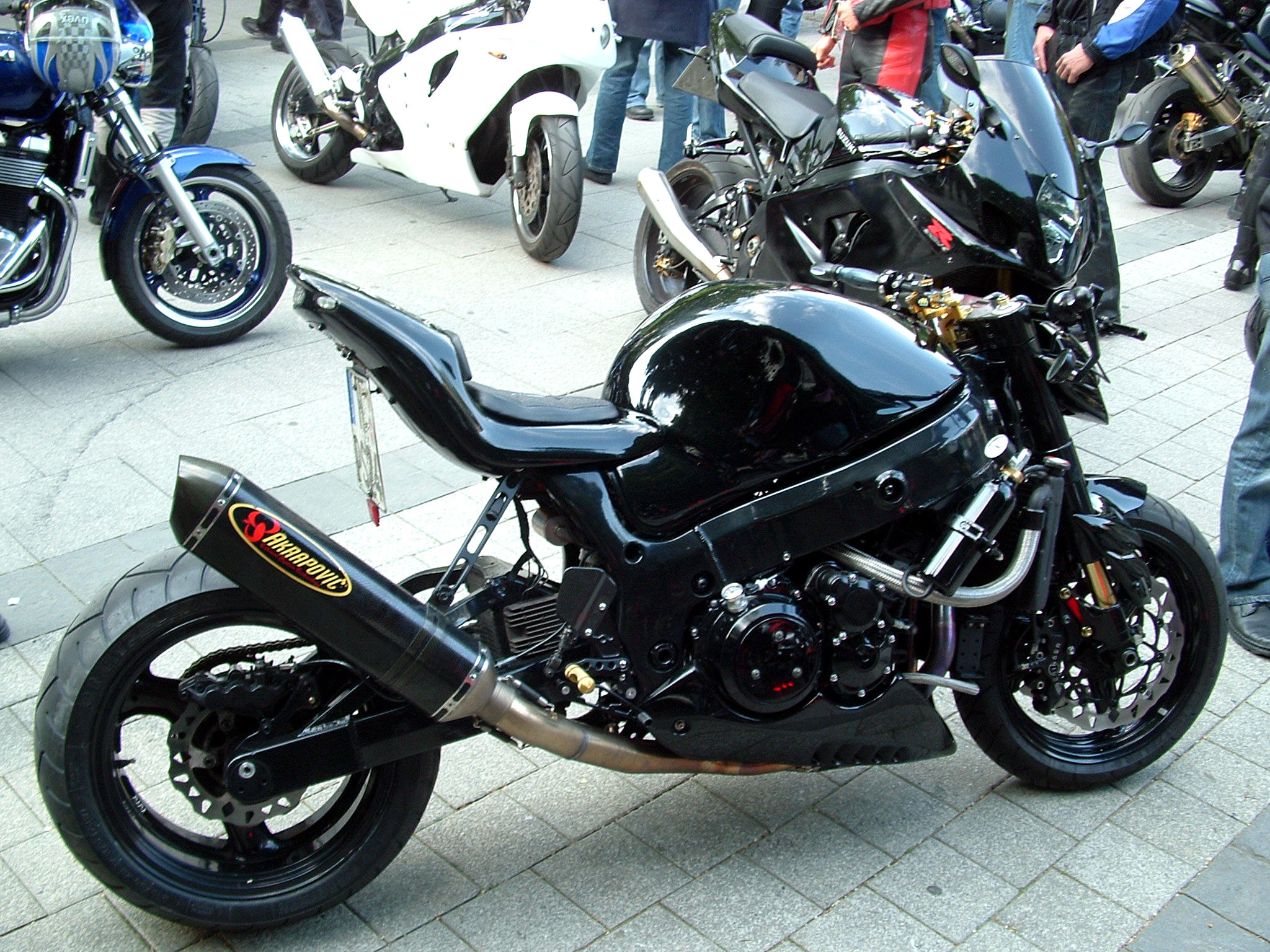
Suzuki Hayabusa with streetfighter modifications

A streetfighter, muscle bike, or super naked bike is a type of high-performance motorcycle. It is typically a large-displacement sport bike with the fairings and windscreen removed. Beyond simply removing fairings, specific changes that exemplify the streetfighter look are a pair of large, round headlights, tall, upright handlebars such as those on a motocross bike, and short, loud, lightweight mufflers, and changes in the sprockets to increase torque and acceleration at lower speeds. Streetfighters is also the name of a UK motorcycle magazine.

Later streetfighters used custom-built frames intended to overcome the weakness of the tubular steel frames of the early 4-cylinder superbikes of the 1970s and 1980s. Many of these frames turned out to be "beautifully crafted pieces of metallurgical art," perhaps only unintentionally. Many were also originally racing machines.

Made popular by European riders, this type of custom motorcycle gained worldwide popularity, and motorcycle manufacturers responded in the late 1990s by adopting the terminology and producing factory-built streetfighters, beginning with the 1994 Triumph Speed Triple and the 1999 Honda X11, up through the 2009 Ducati Streetfighter.

== History ==
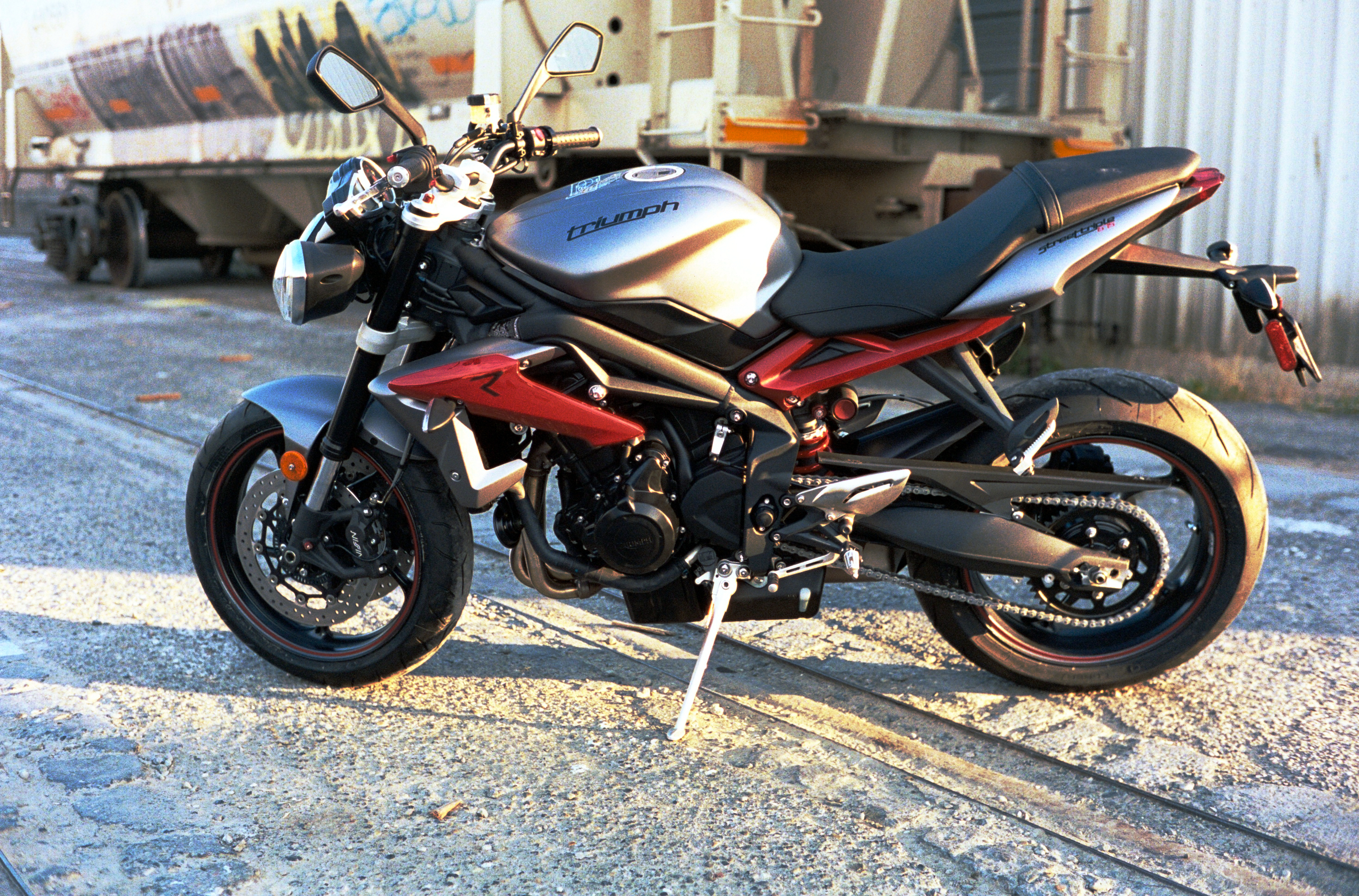
2014 Triumph Street Triple R

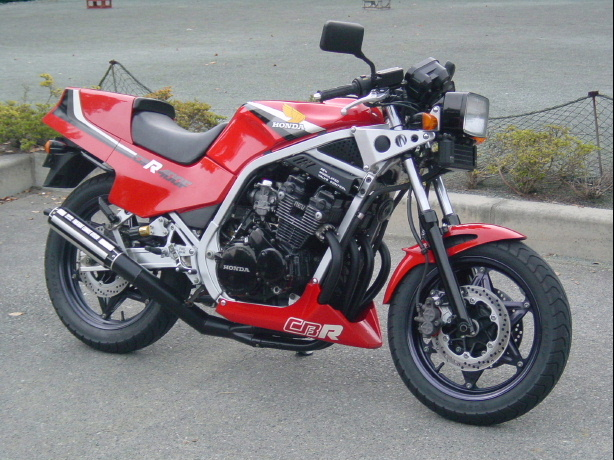
1983 Honda CBR400F

Though it has its styling roots in the café racer culture of the 1950s and 1960s, the streetfighter is very much inspired by the new Japanese bikes of the late 1970s and early 1980s, possibly from young riders who couldn't afford to replace damaged fairings after repeated crashes. Later, more appropriate headlights were added, then high, straight handlebars to aid in wheelies and other stunts.

The first sighting of the streetfighter design template was seen in Bike magazine in 1983 when the editor commissioned Andy Sparrow to draw a comic strip to replace Ogri. It was titled Bloodrunners and featured dispatch riders, delivering blood and live human organs for transplant operations in which bikers rode enormous Japanese inline fours with turbos, with no extraneous parts. Fairings, mirrors, pillion seats & rear footpegs etc. were all binned (removed) in favour of lightness and handling ability. Under-seat exhausts, dual headlights and the widest sport tyres were de-rigueur.

Actor Huggy Leaver is credited with being inspired to build such customized motorcycles in this style and there was a proliferation of 'ratted' streetfighters in London around the late 1980s. The term streetfighter was first applied to a custom street bike by a British photojournalist and bike builder to a Harley-Davidson customized sports-bike, and later extended to the Japanese four-cylinder customs being created at the time.

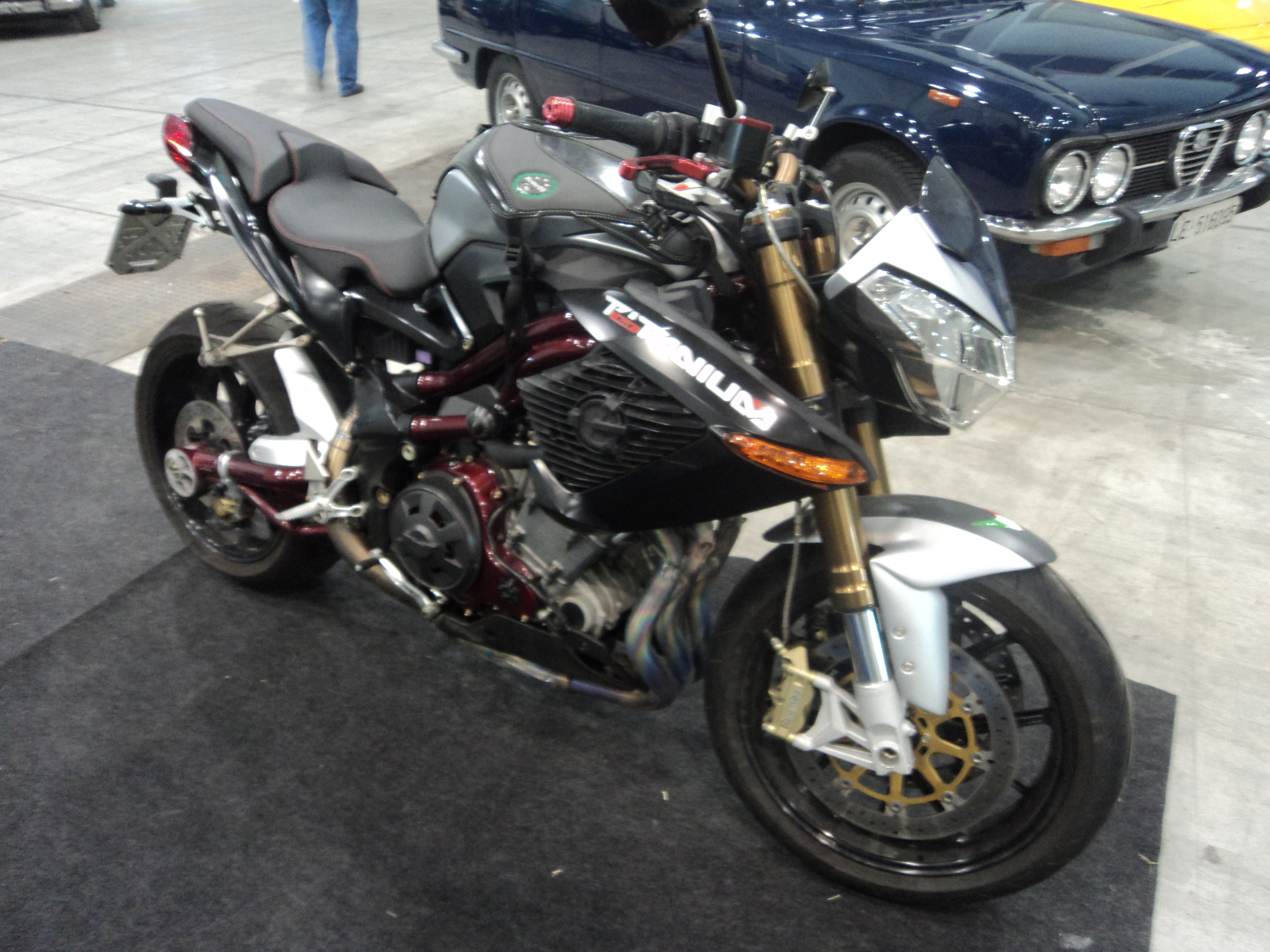
Benelli TNT Fuoriserie

Streetfighter bikes evolved alongside the rising trend of sports bikes in the 1990s. Since plastic fairings were delicate and costly to replace after an accident, some riders stripped the damaged fairings from their bikes and replaced them with cheap after-market parts, such as turn signals made for dirt bikes. Moreover, bikes that sustained minor damage to their bodies were easily declared total losses by insurers, leading to the proliferation of performance bikes that needed minimal repairs before being ridden again. In response to this evolving design trend, motorcycle manufacturers adapted their sport bike frames to manufacture naked bikes commercially.

Today, the streetfighter name and style has been adopted by manufactured motorcycles. Companies recognized the demand for these stripped down sportbikes, and started introducing more "naked" sportbikes into the market. Bikes such as the Ducati Streetfighter appeared, sharing traits with the built streetfighters, such as straight handlebars. Many of these imitation streetfighters often add unnecessary fairings onto the bikes, which ironically contradicts the nature of the bike style itself.

== Culture ==
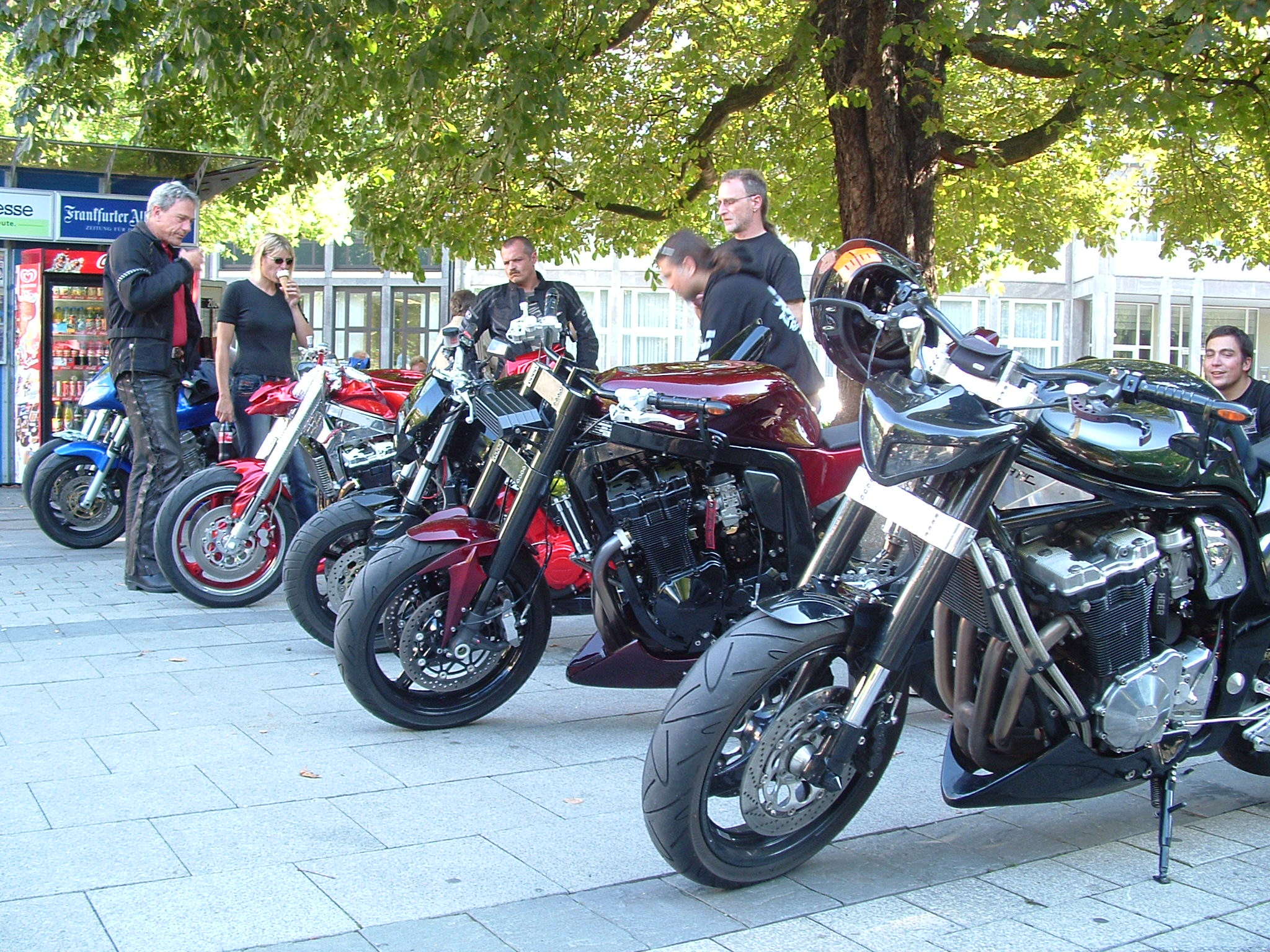
A group of streetfighter styled bikes

The streetfighter motorcycle is built around the concept of high speed riding, and stunting. It represents a countercultural resistance to conformity, and is often adopted by thrill seekers looking to further push their sportbikes to the limit. While similar to Cafe Racers, streetfighter culture is also an icon of rebellious youth.

Unfortunately, with the influx of "readymade" street fighter motorcycles available for purchase, the building and modifying community within this subculture of motorcycle customization is dying off. While this is a phenomenon widespread across motorcycle and vehicle culture as a whole, streetfighter builds have greatly diminished as the affordability of small "naked" motorcycles rises. Manufacturers are more open to producing motorcycles of this style as it is far easier to replicate than that of the Cafe racer or Bobber, since the generational gap for aesthetics is smaller, and the history behind these bike builds isn't as cemented as other designs.

== See also ==
- Standard motorcycle
- Outline of motorcycles and motorcycling
