= X11 (disambiguation) =

X11 is a windowing system common on Unix-like operating systems.

X11 or X-11 may also refer to:

== Technology ==
- X11 (hashing algorithm)
- N11 code, any of a set of public service telephone numbers in North America
- X11.app, the implementation of the X Window System in Mac OS X
- X-11-ARIMA, a predecessor of the X-13ARIMA-SEATS statistics software package

== Transportation ==
- X11 (New York City bus)
- Convair X-11, the first testbed for what became the Atlas missile program
- Honda X11, a motorcycle
- Chevrolet Citation X-11, a performance-enhanced version of the Chevrolet Citation car
- X11, a variation of the SL X10 train

== Other uses ==
- Settlement X11, of the Kuhikugu archaeological site in Brazil
- X11 License, a variation of the MIT permissive software license
