= Ducati 899 =

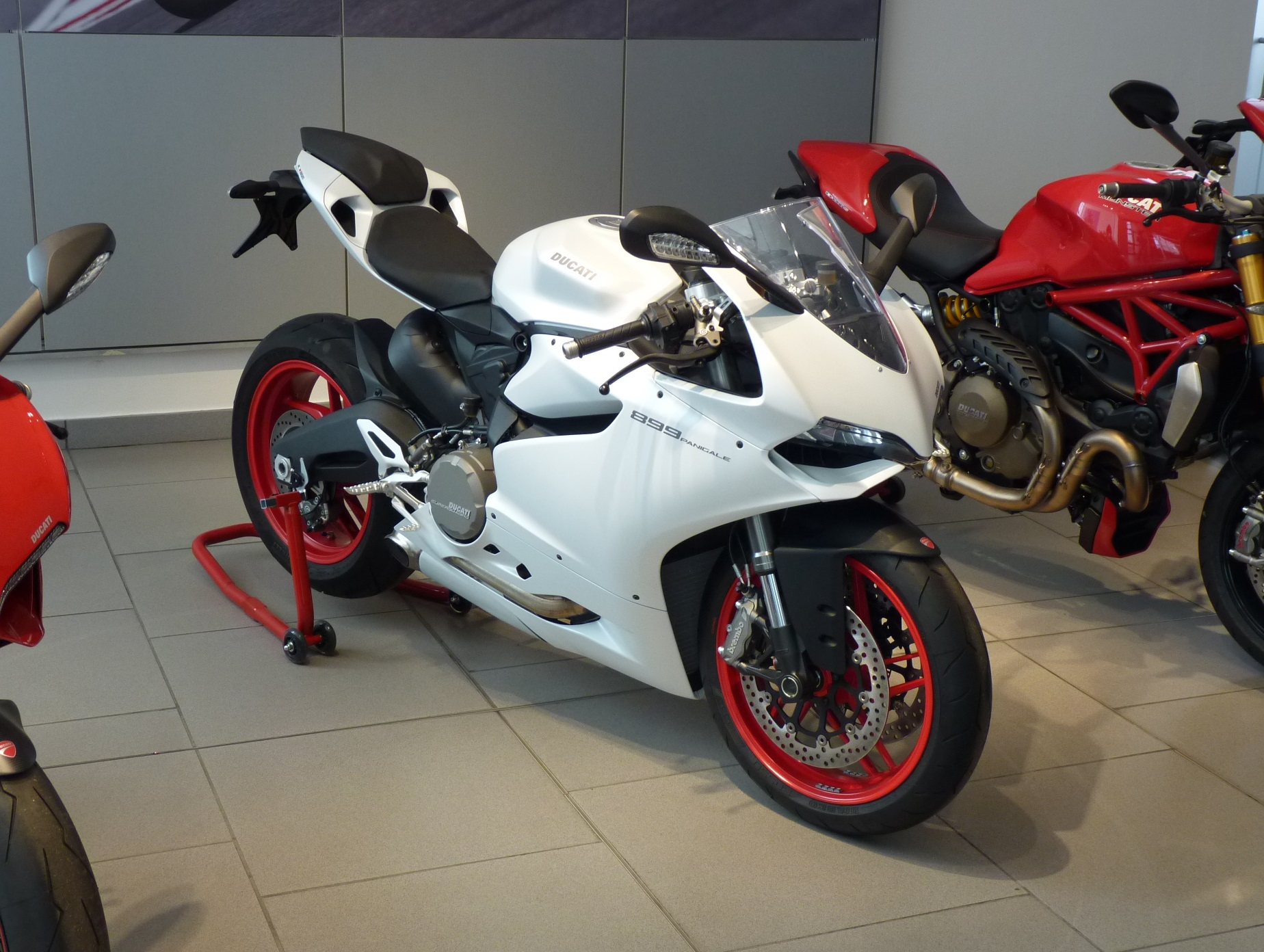
- Manufacturer: Ducati
- Production: 2013–2015
- Predecessor: 848
- Successor: 959
- Class: Sport bike
- Engine: Liquid cooled 90° 898 cc (54.8 cu in) V-twin, 4-valve/cyl desmodromic
- Bore / stroke: 100 mm × 57.2 mm (3.94 in × 2.25 in)
- Compression ratio: 12.5:1
- Power: Claimed: 148 hp (110 kW) @ 10,750 rpm
- Torque: Claimed: 99 N⋅m (73 lbf⋅ft) @ 9,000 rpm
- Transmission: 6 speed, wet multi-plate, chain drive, manual
- Frame type: Aluminum monocoque
- Suspension: Front: Fully adjustable 43 mm (1.7 in) Showa
- Brakes: Front: Brembo radial monobloc calipers, 2×320 mm (13 in) discs Rear: 245 mm (9.6 in) disc, ABS
- Rake, trail: 24°
- Wheelbase: 1,426 mm (56.1 in)
- Weight: Claimed: 169 kg (373 lb) (dry)
- Related: Ducati 1199

The Ducati 899 Panigale is a 898 cc (54.8 cu in) sport bike from Ducati, released in 2013 to replace the 848. The motorcycle is named after the small manufacturing town of Borgo Panigale. It has a 148-horsepower (110 kW) version of the engine in the previously released 1199 Panigale. Claimed dry weight is 169 kilograms (373 lb). The 899 has a conventional two-sided swingarm, unlike the 1199 which has a single-sided swingarm. The unconventional decision to use a two-sided swingarm on a superbike from Ducati was made because of the substantial upgrades added to the bike including electronically adjustable anti-lock brakes, traction control, electronic braking control, and a quickshifter. This is the first medium-sized Ducati that uses the Superquadro engine.

The 899 surprised observers by topping sales charts for all motorcycles in the UK for December 2013, at a price five times higher than the number two seller, the Honda CBF125 — a situation compared by The Telegraph to the Ferrari California outselling the Ford Focus.

For 2016, Ducati revised the 899, including enlarging the engine to 955 cc (58.3 cu in) (the 959 Panigale).
