= Ducati Panigale V4 =

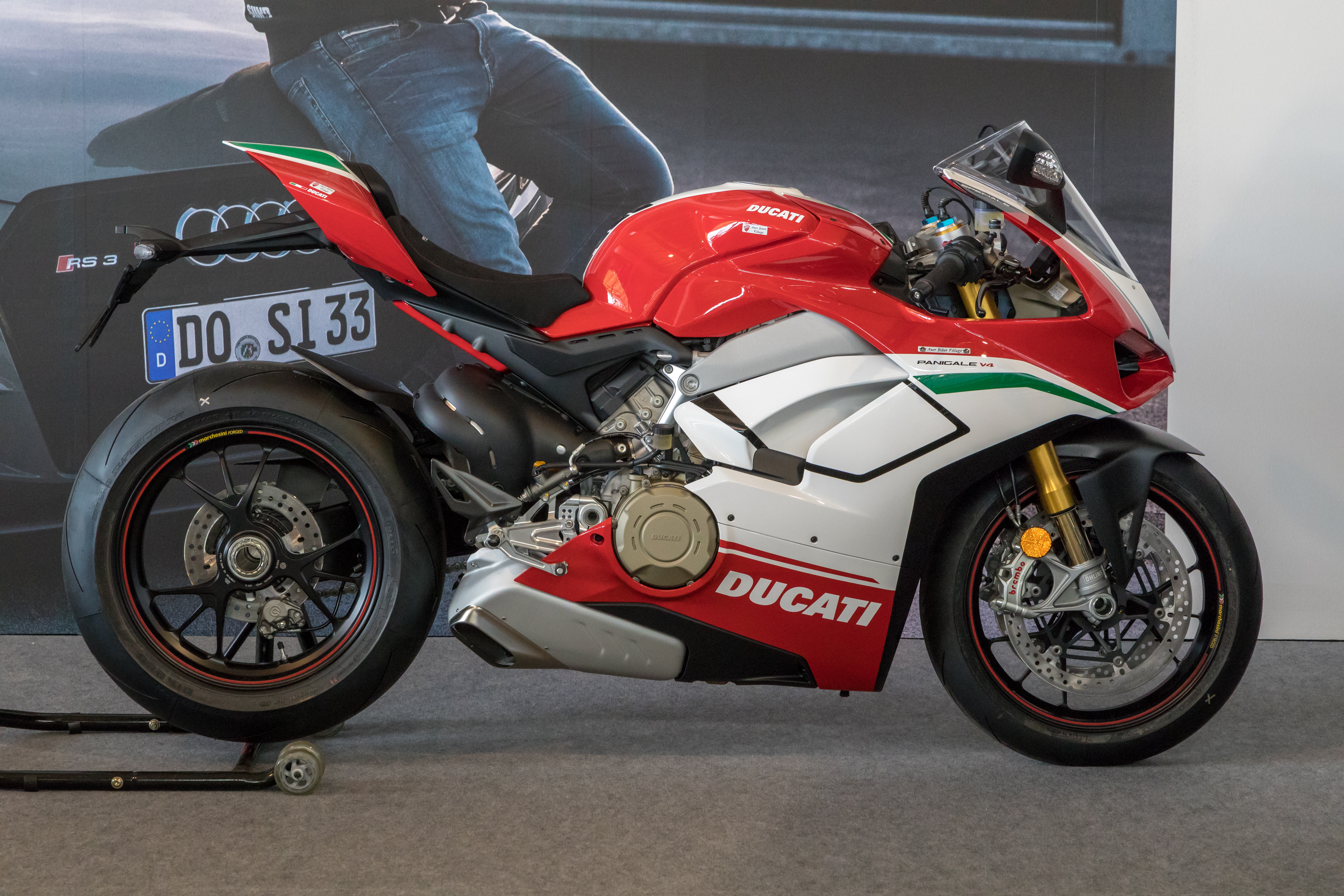
- 2018 Ducati Panigale V4 Speciale
- Manufacturer: Ducati
- Parent company: Audi
- Production: 2018–present
- Predecessor: Ducati 1299
- Class: Sport bike
- Engine: 1,103 cc (67.3 cu in) liquid-cooled 4-stroke desmodromic 16-valve DOHC 90° V4 (V4, V4 S); 998 cc (60.9 cu in) liquid-cooled 4-stroke desmodromic 16-valve DOHC 90° V4 (V4 R)
- Bore / stroke: 81.0 mm × 53.5 mm (3.19 in × 2.11 in) (V4/V4 S); 81.0 mm × 48.4 mm (3.19 in × 1.91 in) (V4 R)
- Compression ratio: 14.0:1
- Power: 160.92 kW (215.80 hp; 218.79 PS) @ 13,000 rpm (V4/V4 S); 172 kW (231 hp; 234 PS) @ 15,250 rpm (V4 R)
- Torque: 124 N⋅m (91 lbf⋅ft) @ 10,000 rpm (V4/V4 S); 112 N⋅m (83 lbf⋅ft) @ 11,500 rpm (V4 R)
- Transmission: 6-speed manual, wet multi-plate clutch, chain final drive
- Frame type: Aluminum perimeter
- Suspension: Front: Inverted 43 mm (1.7 in) Showa telescopic fork, 120 mm (4.7 in) travel (V4/V4 S); inverted 43 mm (1.7 in) Öhlins NPX pressurised telescopic fork with TiN treatment (V4 R); Rear: Single-sided aluminium swingarm, Sachs shocks, 130 mm (5.1 in) travel (V4/V4 S); single-sided aluminum swingarm, Öhlins TTX36 shocks, adjustable pivot position +/- 3 mm (0.12 in) (V4 R)
- Brakes: Front: Radially-mounted Brembo Monobloc Stylema 4-piston caliper with dual 330 mm (13 in) semi-floating discs; Rear: Dual-piston caliper with single 245 mm (9.6 in) disc
- Tires: Front: 120/70–17; Rear: 200/60–17
- Rake, trail: 24.5°, 100 mm (3.9 in)
- Wheelbase: 1,469 mm (57.8 in) (V4/V4 S); 1,471 mm (57.9 in) (V4 R)
- Seat height: 830 mm (33 in)
- Fuel capacity: 16 L (3.5 imp gal; 4.2 US gal)
- Related: Ducati Panigale V2

The Ducati Panigale V4 is a sport bike with a 1,103 cc (67.3 cu in) desmodromic 90° V4 engine introduced by Ducati in 2018 as the successor to the V-twin engined 1299. A smaller engine displacement version complies with the Superbike category competition regulations which state "Over 750 cc up to 1000 cc" for three and four cylinder 4-stroke engines.

The name "Panigale" comes from the small manufacturing town of Borgo Panigale, where Ducati is headquartered. The Panigale V4 uses the new Desmosedici Stradale V4 engine, derived from the Desmosedici MotoGP racing engine.

== Development ==
Wade says the Panigale V4 is Ducati's first large-production street bike with a V4 engine, Ducati having primarily used V-twins since the 1960s, except on prototypes and racing motorcycles. They had sold a short run of 1,500 street-legal V4 Desmosedici RRs in 2007 and 2008 and made two prototypes of the Apollo V4 in 1964.

The initial development of the Panigale V4 started with the 2015 MotoGP racing engine. Ducati said the Panigale V4 was designed to combine racing features, while also being an entertaining and rideable motorcycle with a durable engine. This created the challenge of designing an engine that could keep the MotoGP engine's counter-rotating crankshaft, and large bore diameter, but have the 24,000 km (15,000 miles) service intervals expected on consumer motorcycles. Originally, Ducati was initially keeping the MotoGP bike's chassis, but later changed to a completely new front frame they said has less weight and more stability.

== Design ==
Cycle World said in spite of being a V4, the new Panigale is only slightly wider than the V-twin 1299. The weight is 4.5 kg (10 lb) heavier than the 1299, with foot pegs 10 mm (0.39 in) higher. Unlike the prior 1199 and 1299 where the engine is the primary element of the frame, the engine is surrounded by a more conventional aluminum perimeter frame.

The Panigale V4's electronics include a wheelie control system derived from the 1299 Superleggera, along with traction and drift control. It has carbon fiber wheels, Brembo Stylema R front brakes, and a dry weight of 173 kg. The brakes have a new ABS designed for high speed cornering. Ducati and Brembo designed 70 g (2.5 oz)-lighter brake calipers than the 1299's. The bike's tires, the Diablo Super Corsa SP developed by Ducati and Pirelli, have a new rear compound.

=== Engine ===
The Panigale V4's 1,103 cc (67.3 cu in) desmodromic 90° V4 engine, unlike the prior 1199 and 1299 where the engine is the primary element of the frame, is surrounded by a more conventional aluminum perimeter frame. The engine is rotated further backwards than other Ducatis, so that the swingarm pivot is mated to the rear cylinders, rather than lower on the engine near the crankshaft. Unlike most street bikes and previous Ducatis other than MotoGP racing machines, the Panigale V4's engine rotates in the opposite direction to the wheels, counteracting the gyroscopic effect and therefore decreasing the force necessary to change the bike's inclination.

== Variants ==
=== Panigale V4 S ===
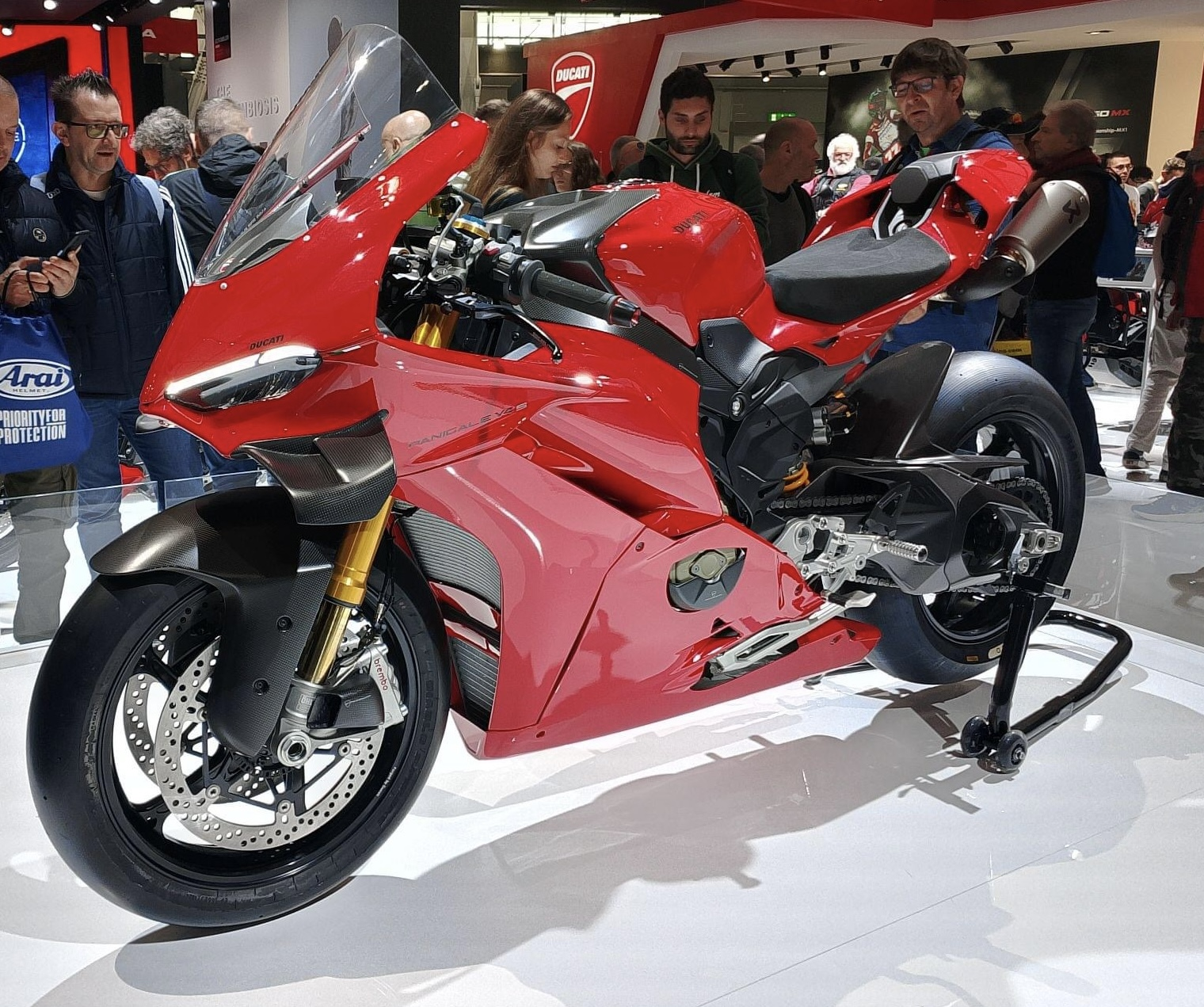
Ducati Panigale V4 S

The Panigale V4 S is a more performance-oriented version of the base V4. It has an Öhlins suspension that the rider can electronically adjust, or set to the sport, race, or street modes typical of contemporary performance bikes. It also has a lightweight lithium battery, and forged aluminium wheels, reducing the bike's overall weight.

=== Panigale V4 Speciale ===
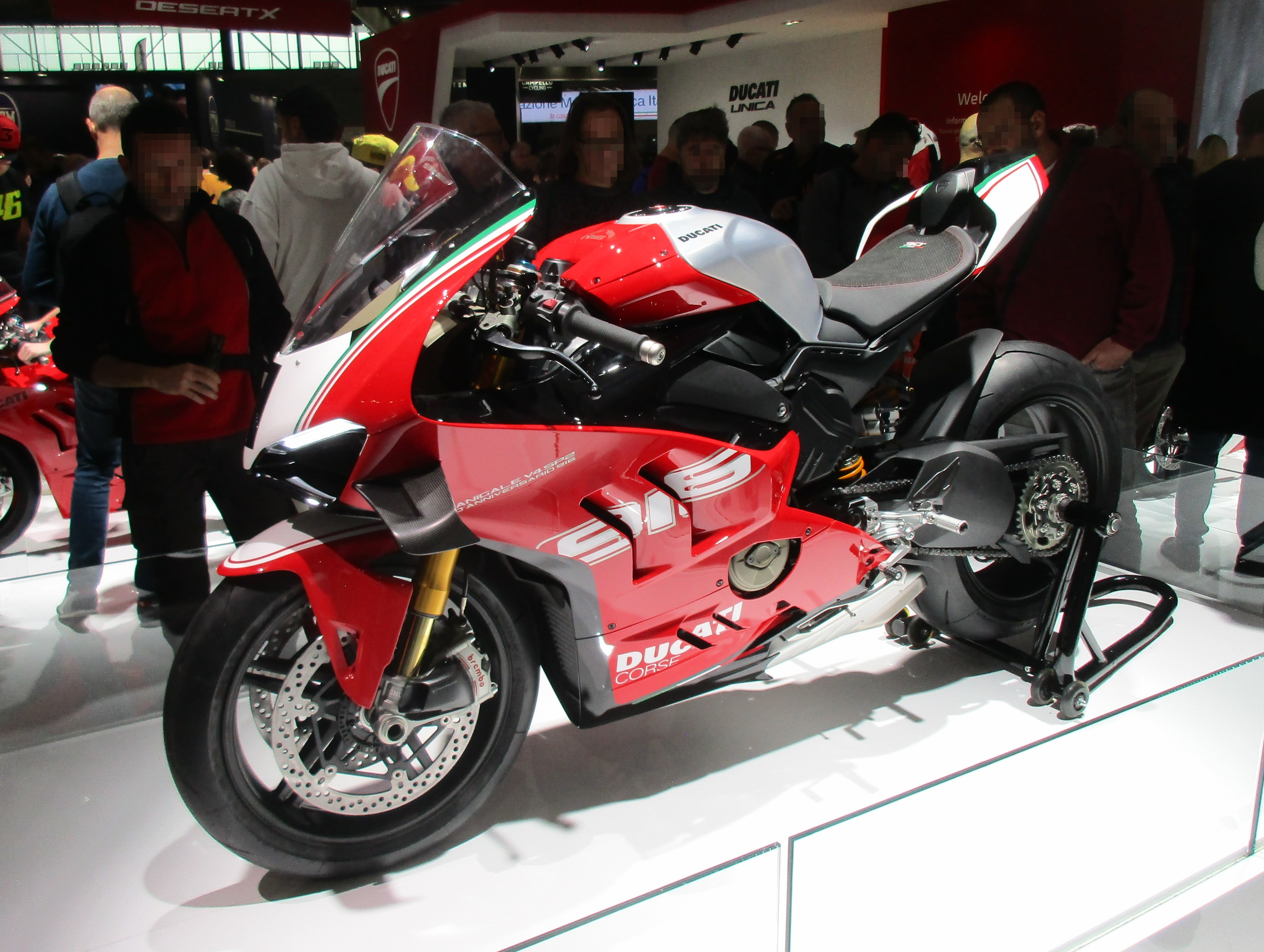
Ducati Panigale V4 Speciale

The Panigale V4 Speciale has the S model options, and adds adjustable footpads, an Alcantara-trimmed seat, a top triple clamp, carbon mudguards, a data analyzer system, and race fuel cap. It also has a titanium exhaust and race kit that increases the power from 157.5 kW (211.2 hp; 214.1 PS) to 166.3 kW (223.0 hp; 226.1 PS).

=== Panigale V4 R ===
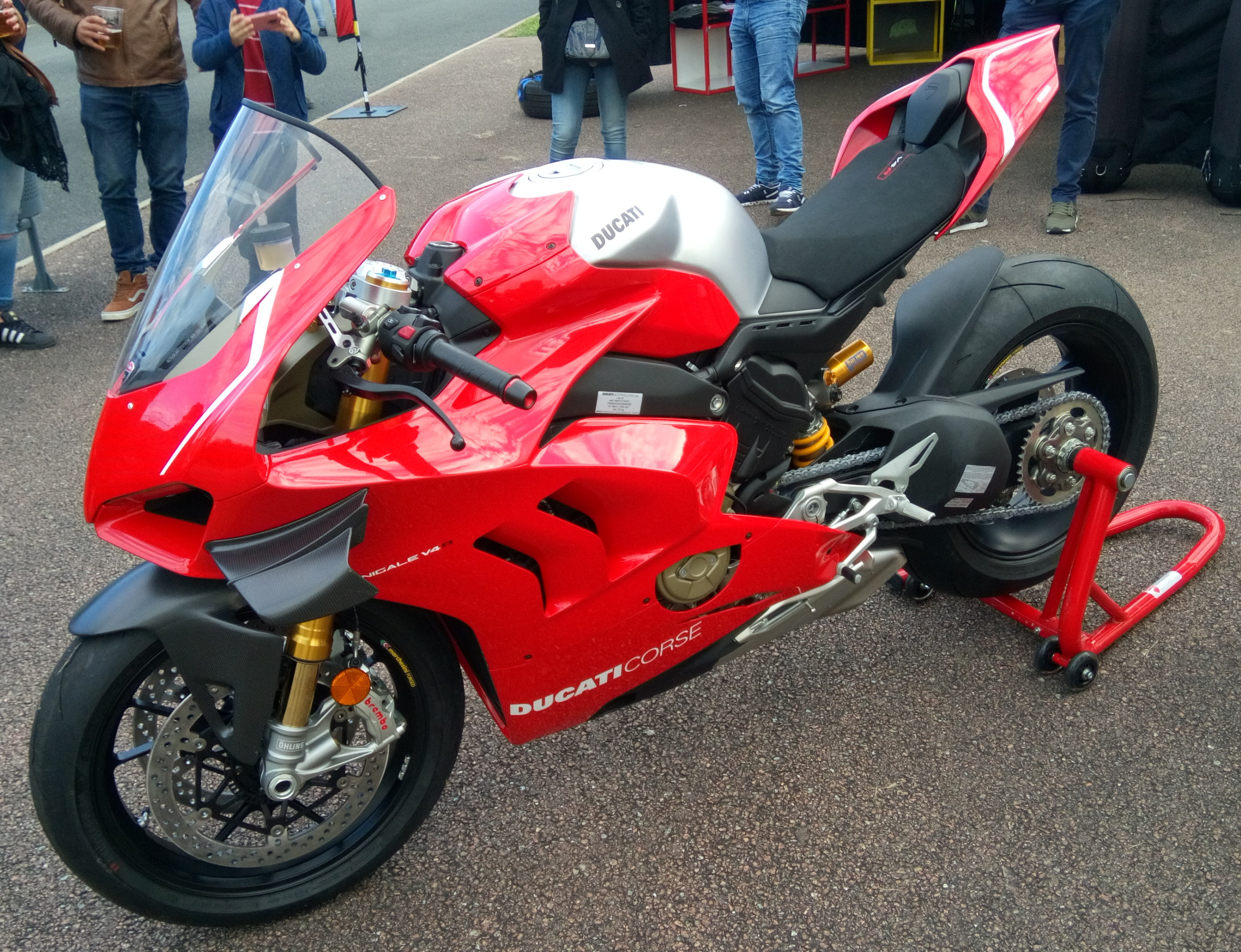
Ducati Panigale V4 R

The Panigale V4 R is a WSBK homologation special of the standard V4. Compared to the standard 1,103 cc (67.3 cu in) engine of the Panigale V4/V4 S, the V4 R uses a 998 cc (60.9 cu in) variant to comply with WSBK rules. This engine produces 160.4 kW (215.1 hp; 218.1 PS) at 15,500 rpm and 111.3 N⋅m (82.1 lbf⋅ft) of torque at 12,000 rpm with a dry weight of 172 kg (379 lb) and kerb weight of 193.5 kg (427 lb). The optional race kit package raises engine power to 174 kW (233 hp; 237 PS) at 15,500 rpm and 118 N⋅m (87 lbf⋅ft) of torque at 12,250 rpm while reducing weight by 5 kg (11 lb). This makes the V4 R the most powerful current street-legal production bike available in the world, meaning that, with a dry weight of 167 kg, it reaches a power-to-weight ratio of 1.42. The engine has a rev limit of 18,250 rpm. The frame has been reworked and the swingarm pivot can be adjusted. The fairing has been widened by 38 mm (1.5 in) as part of the aerodynamic styling. According to the Ducati CEO Claudio Domenicali, the winglets applied to the V4 R fairing are almost identical to the GP16 MotoGP bike. The suspension uses fully adjustable titanium nitrided NPX front forks by Öhlins, and the rear a fully adjustable Öhlins TTX36 monoshock.

=== Panigale V4 Superleggera ===
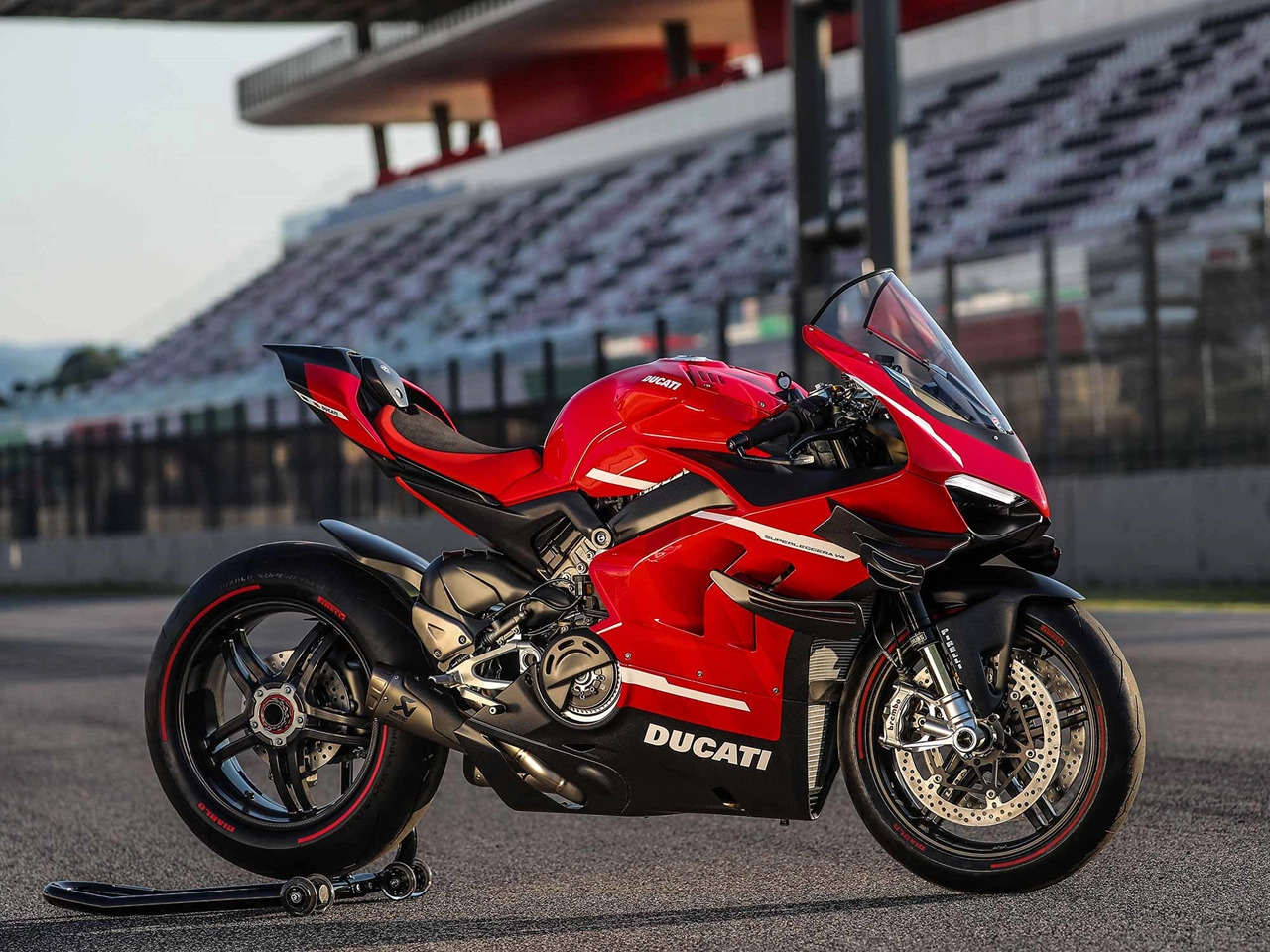
Ducati Panigale V4 Superleggera

For 2020, Ducati introduced the Panigale V4 Superleggera. This is the third superleggera incarnation after the 1199 and 1299 superleggera models. As with previous Superleggeras, a run of only 500 were manufactured, with reduced weight being the design philosophy. The frame, swingarm and rims are all manufactured from carbon. It produces 165 kW (221 hp; 224 PS) @ 15,250 rpm and 116 N⋅m (86 lbf⋅ft) of torque at 11,750 rpm or 174 kW (233 hp; 237 PS) @ 15,500 rpm and 119 N⋅m (88 lbf⋅ft) of torque at 11,750 rpm with full racing exhaust), and has a dry weight of 159 kg (351 lb) or 152.2 kg (336 lb) with the race kit. This makes the V4 Superleggera the most powerful street-legal production bike available in the world, meaning that, with a dry weight of 152.2 kg, it reaches a power-to-weight ratio of 1.56.

=== Panigale V4 Superleggera Centenario ===
For 2026, Ducati announced the Panigale V4 Superleggera Centenario to celebrate the 100th anniversary. This is the fourth superleggera incarnation after the 1199, 1299 and V4 superleggera models. As with previous Superleggeras, a run of only 500 were manufactured with a Tricolore version limited to an additional 100, with increased power and reduced weight being the design philosophy. The frame, swingarm, rims and front fork are all manufactured from carbon, whilst the front brake discs are carbon-ceramic. It produces 170 kW (230 hp; 230 PS) @ 14,750 rpm and 119 N⋅m (88 lbf⋅ft) of torque at 10,750 rpm or 184.2 kW (247.0 hp; 250.4 PS) @ 15,500 rpm and 122 N⋅m (90 lbf⋅ft) of torque at 11,750 rpm with full racing exhaust), and has a dry weight of 173 kg (381 lb) or 167 kg (368 lb) with the race kit. Powering the motorcycle is a new Desmosedici Stradale R 1100 engine with a total displacement of 1103cc and it uses the same electronics package as the 2026 Panigale V4 R inheriting new features like neutral lock.

=== Panigale V4 Tricolore ===
This Ducati Panigale V4 Tricolore released by Ducati for the brand’s centenary is exclusive and produced in just 1000 units with special components such as carbon fibre wheels and the Brembo racing braking system.

=== Panigale V4 Lamborghini ===
During Milan Design Week, Ducati and Lamborghini have established a collaboration by releasing a Ducati Panigale V4 Lamborghini and a Lamborghini Revuelto with the same two-tone livery in Grigio Telesto and Nero Noctis with details and logo of number 63 in Verde Scandal. This represents the third time in the partnership between Ducati and Lamborghini. This event was called The Art of Unexpected.

== Specifications ==
	Panigale V4 R	Panigale V4 Superleggera	Panigale V4 Superleggera Centenario
Engine	liquid-cooled 4-stroke desmodromic 16-valve DOHC 90° V4		
Displacement	997.6 cc		1102.7 cc
Bore x Stroke	81 mm × 48.4 mm (3.2 in × 1.9 in); 249.5 cc		81 mm × 53.5 mm (3.2 in × 2.1 in); 275.67 cc
Compression Ratio	14.0:1		
Power	162.6 kW (221 PS; 218 hp) @ 15,750 rpm	165 kW (224 PS; 221 hp) @ 15,250 rpm 174 kW (237 PS; 233 hp) @ 15,500 rpm with the race kit	170 kW (231 PS; 228 hp) @ 14,750 rpm 182 kW (247 PS; 244 hp) @ 14,750 rpm with race exhaust
Torque	114.5 N⋅m (11.7 kg⋅m; 84.5 lb⋅ft) @ 12,000 rpm	116 N⋅m (11.8 kg⋅m; 85.6 lb⋅ft) @ 11,750 rpm 119 N⋅m (12.1 kg⋅m; 87.8 lb⋅ft) @ 11,750 rpm with racing exhaust	119 N⋅m (12.1 kg⋅m; 87.8 lb⋅ft) @ 10,750 rpm 126.3 N⋅m (12.9 kg⋅m; 93.2 lb⋅ft) @ 12,500 rpm with racing exhaust
Gearbox	6-speed manual with neutral lock, hydraulically controlled dry slipper clutch, chain final drive	6-speed manual, hydraulically controlled dry slipper clutch, chain final drive	6-speed manual with neutral lock, hydraulically controlled dry slipper clutch, chain final drive
Fuel tank capacity	17 L (3.7 imp gal; 4.5 US gal) (includes 3 L reserve)	16 L (3.5 imp gal; 4.2 US gal) (includes 3 L reserve)	17 L (3.7 imp gal; 4.5 US gal) (includes 3 L reserve)
Weight	Wet weight no fuel 186.5 kg (411 lb)	Dry weight 159 kg (351 lb); 152.2 kg (336 lb) with the race kit	Wet weight no fuel 173 kg (381 lb); 167 kg (368 lb) with the race kit
