= Ducati Panigale V2 =

Italian sport bike

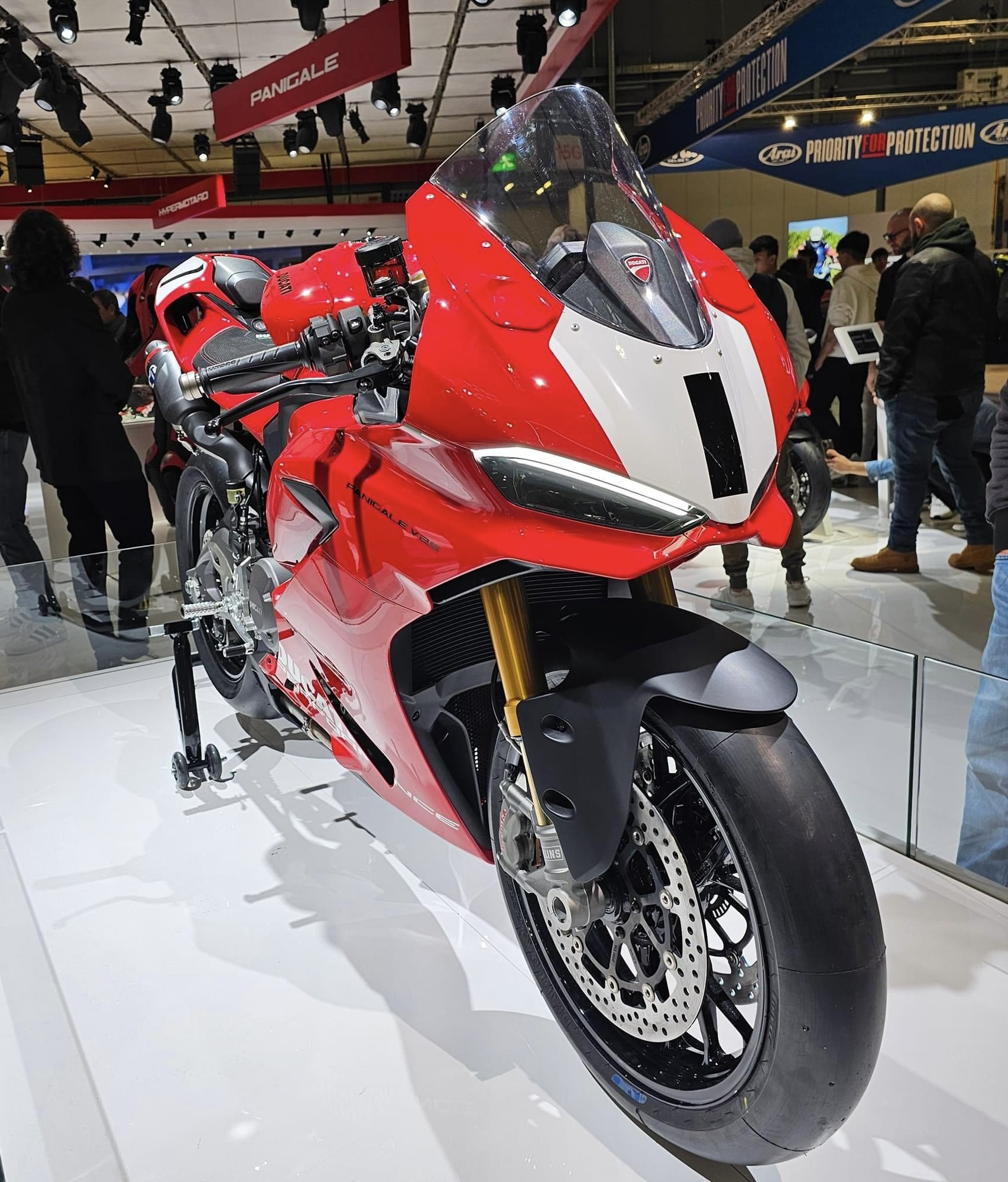
- 2025 Ducati Panigale V2 S
- Manufacturer: Ducati
- Parent company: Audi
- Production: 2020–present
- Predecessor: 959
- Class: Sport bike
- Engine: Liquid cooled 90° V-twin; 2020–2024: 955 cc (58.3 cu in), 4-valve/cyl desmodromic 2025–present: 890 cc (54 cu in), 4-valve/cyl spring-actuated
- Bore / stroke: 2020–2024: 100 mm × 60.8 mm (3.94 in × 2.39 in); 2025–present: 96 mm × 61.5 mm (3.78 in × 2.42 in)
- Compression ratio: 2020–2024: 12.5:1; 2025–present: 13.1:1
- Power: 2020–2024: Claimed: 155 hp (116 kW) @ 10,750 rpm 2025–present: Claimed: 120 hp (89 kW) @ 10,750 rpm
- Torque: 2020–2024: Claimed: 104 N⋅m (77 lbf⋅ft) @ 9,000 rpm 2025–present: Claimed: 93.3 N⋅m (68.8 lbf⋅ft) @ 8,250 rpm
- Transmission: 6-speed, wet multi-plate, chain drive
- Frame type: Aluminum monocoque
- Suspension: Front: Fully adjustable 43 mm (1.7 in) forks (2020–2024: Showa; 2025–present: Marzocchi or Öhlins NIX30 on V2 S); Rear: Fully adjustable (2020–2024: Sachs; 2025–present: Kayaba or Öhlins on V2 S)
- Brakes: Front: Brembo radial monobloc calipers, 2×320 mm (13 in) discs Rear: 245 mm (9.6 in) disc, Cornering ABS EVO
- Tires: Front: 120/70 ZR17; Rear: 180/60 ZR17
- Rake, trail: Rake: 24° Front trail: 94mm
- Wheelbase: 1,436 mm (56.5 in)
- Seat height: 840 mm (33 in)
- Weight: 2020–2024: Claimed: 176 kg (388 lb); 2025–present: Claimed: 179 kg (395 lb) (base), 176 kg (388 lb) (V2 S) (dry); 2020–2024: Kerb: 205 kg (452 lb); 2025–present: 191 kg (421 lb) (wet)
- Fuel capacity: 17 L (3.7 imp gal; 4.5 US gal)
- Related: Ducati Panigale V4

The Ducati Panigale V2 is a V-twin engine sport bike manufactured by Ducati as the successor to the Panigale 959. The motorcycle is named after the manufacturing district of Borgo Panigale. Initially introduced in 2019 for the 2020 model year with a 955 cc (58.3 cu in) engine, it was significantly redesigned in 2024 for the 2025 model year, adopting a smaller 890 cc (54.3 cu in) engine. The Panigale V2 has evolved over its production run, balancing performance with compliance to stricter emissions standards.

== History ==
The Panigale V2 was first announced in 2019 as a 2020 model, featuring a 955 cc liquid-cooled 90° V-twin engine with desmodromic valves. Its chassis, a monocoque design with a stressed-member engine, remained structurally similar to the 959, though re-engineering increased power by 5 horsepower (3.7 kW) to 155 horsepower (116 kW) and achieved Euro 5 emissions compliance. The bike retained the same 100 by 60.8 millimetres (3.94 in × 2.39 in) bore and stroke as its predecessor.

=== 2025 Model Redesign ===
In November 2024, Ducati unveiled a fully redesigned Panigale V2 for the 2025 model year at the EICMA show in Milan. Unlike earlier models derived from larger superbike platforms, the 2025 version was engineered as a standalone middleweight sport bike, prioritizing street usability and track agility. The centerpiece of the redesign is an all-new 890 cc (54.3 cu in) 90° V-twin engine, replacing the 955 cc Superquadro. This engine, named simply "V2" by Ducati, ditches the desmodromic valve system for conventional spring-actuated valves with finger followers and includes an intake variable timing (IVT) system for enhanced torque delivery. It produces a claimed 120 horsepower (89 kW) at 10,750 rpm and 93.3 newton-metres (68.8 lbf⋅ft) at 8,250 rpm, with 70% of peak torque available at 3,000 rpm, improving low-end and mid-range performance.

The 2025 model is lighter, with a claimed dry weight of 179 kilograms (395 lb) for the base version and 176 kilograms (388 lb) for the V2 S, thanks to the new engine (weighing 54.4 kilograms (120 lb), Ducati's lightest twin-cylinder to date), a revised cast aluminum monocoque chassis, and a double-sided swingarm replacing the prior single-sided design. The V2 S variant features Öhlins suspension (NIX30 fork and monoshock) and a lithium-ion battery, while the base model uses Marzocchi forks and a Kayaba rear shock. Styling echoes the Panigale V4, with full LED headlights and a revised ergonomic setup featuring clip-ons above the triple clamp for added comfort.

The electronics package includes a six-axis IMU managing cornering ABS, traction control, wheelie control, and engine brake control, adjustable via four riding modes (Race, Sport, Road, Wet) on a 5-inch TFT display. The Ducati Quickshift 2.0 system enhances gear shifts. Despite lower peak power, the 2025 Panigale V2 remains track-competitive, with test rider Davide Stirpe lapping Vallelunga only 0.2 seconds slower than the 955 cc model, citing improved agility and braking. It complies with Euro 5+ standards, and valve clearance intervals extend to 30,000 kilometres (19,000 mi). Available in base and V2 S variants, priced at US$15,995 and US$18,995 respectively, deliveries began in Q1 2025.
