= Ducati 959 =

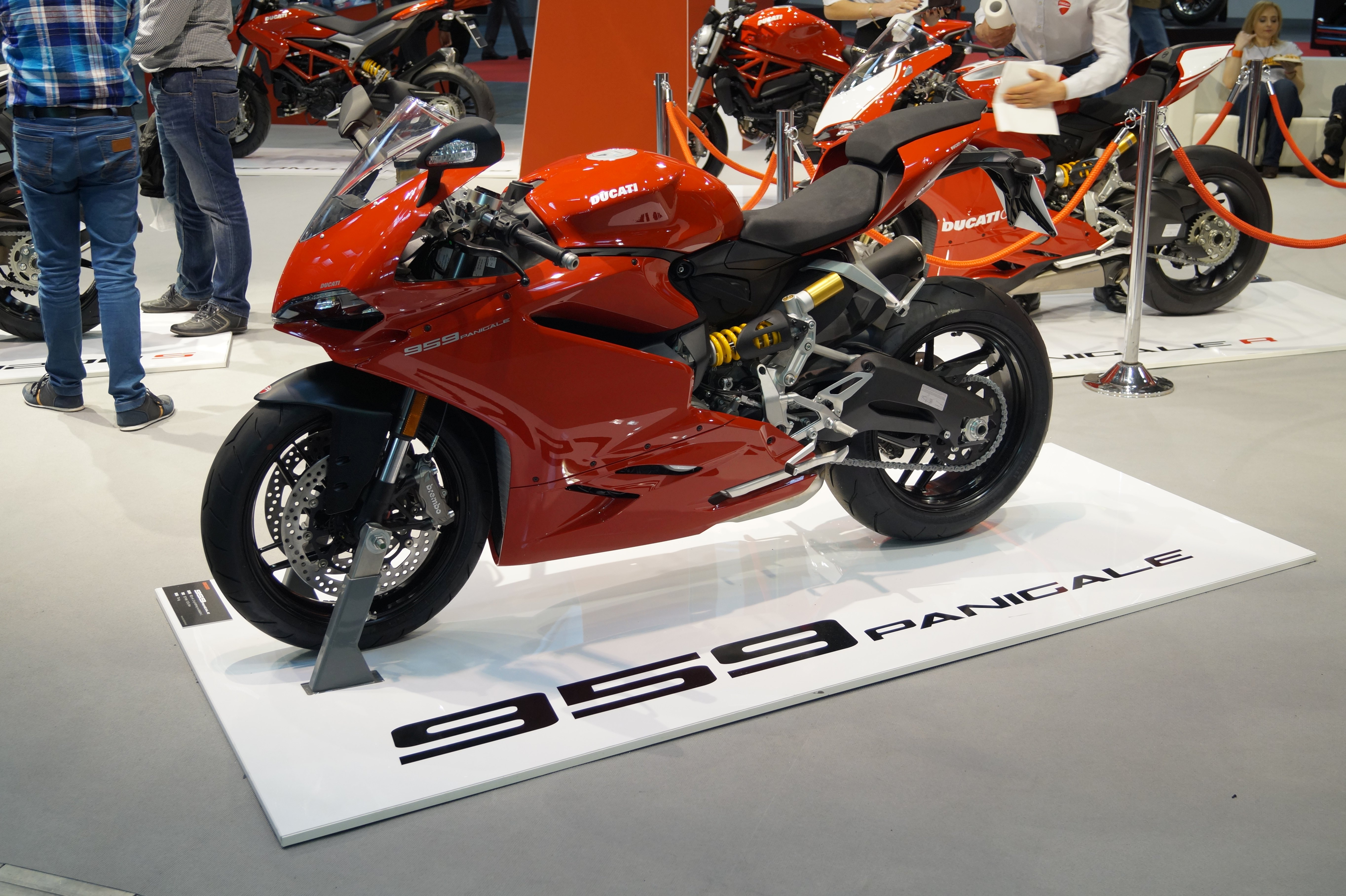
- Manufacturer: Ducati
- Production: 2016–2019
- Predecessor: 899
- Successor: Panigale V2
- Class: Sport bike
- Engine: Liquid cooled 90° 955 cc (58.3 cu in) V-twin, 4-valve/cyl desmodromic
- Bore / stroke: 100 mm × 60.8 mm (3.94 in × 2.39 in)
- Compression ratio: 12.5:1
- Power: Claimed: 157 hp (117 kW) @ 10,500 rpm
- Torque: Claimed: 107.4 N⋅m (79.2 lbf⋅ft) @ 9,000 rpm
- Transmission: 6-speed, wet multi-plate, chain drive
- Frame type: Aluminum monocoque
- Suspension: Front: Fully adjustable 43 mm (1.7 in) Showa; Rear: Fully adjustable Sachs
- Brakes: Front: Brembo radial monobloc calipers, 2×320 mm (13 in) discs Rear: 245 mm (9.6 in) disc, ABS
- Rake, trail: Rake: 24° Front trail: 96mm
- Wheelbase: 1,431 mm (56.3 in)
- Weight: Claimed: 176 kg (388 lb) (dry)
- Related: Ducati 1299

The Ducati 959 Panigale is a 955 cc (58.3 cu in) sport bike manufactured by Ducati as the successor to the 898 cc (54.8 cu in) 899. The motorcycle is named after the small manufacturing town of Borgo Panigale. It was announced in 2015 for the 2016 model year and was replaced by its successor Ducati Panigale V2.
