= Ducati 1299 =

Italian sport motorcycle

Ducati Panigale 1299
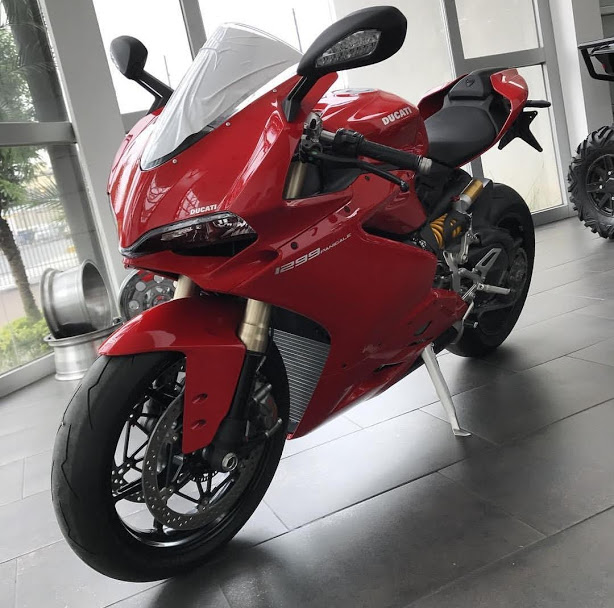
- Manufacturer: Ducati
- Production: 2015–2018
- Predecessor: 1199
- Successor: Panigale V4
- Class: Sport bike
- Engine: Liquid cooled 90° 1,285 cc (78.4 cu in) L-twin, 4-valve/cyl desmodromic
- Bore / stroke: 116 mm × 60.8 mm (4.57 in × 2.39 in)
- Compression ratio: 12.6:1
- Power: 205 hp (150.8 kW) @ 10,500 rpm (claimed); 174.8 hp (130.3 kW)@ 10,400 rpm (rear wheel)
- Torque: 106.7 lb-ft @ 8750 rpm (claimed); 94.2 lb⋅ft (127.7 N⋅m)@ 8,500 rpm (rear wheel))
- Transmission: 6-speed constant-mesh sequential manual
- Frame type: Aluminum monocoque
- Tires: Pirelli Diablo Supercorsa SP; Front: 3.5"×17" 120/70 ZR17. Rear: 6"×17" 200/55 ZR17
- Rake, trail: 24°, 3.8 in (97 mm)
- Wheelbase: 1,440 mm (56.6 in)
- Seat height: 830 mm (32.7 in)
- Weight: 166 kg (367 lb) (dry); 191 kg (420 lb) (wet)
- Fuel capacity: 17 L; 3.7 imp gal (4.5 US gal)
- Related: Ducati 959

The Ducati 1299 Panigale is a 1,285 cc (78.4 cu in) Ducati sport bike unveiled at the 2014 Milan Motorcycle Show and produced between 2015 and 2018 as a successor to the 1,198 cc (73.1 cu in) 1199. The motorcycle is named after the small manufacturing town of Borgo Panigale.

The 1299 wheelbase remains the same at 1437 mm. The base version retains front forks by Marzocchi and Sachs shock absorber; The S variant has new semi-active Öhlins Smart EC suspension that can be switched between different driving modes to match road conditions.

The entire range is now equipped with new generation of electronics, including a new IMU, racing ABS and anti-wheelie. Switchable riding modes and traction controls, similar to the old version, have been ported over onto the new platform.

== Ducati Panigale R ==
Due to World SuperBike engine displacement regulations, the engine in the R variant of 1299 Panigale retains the old 1,198 cc displacement, with the addition of a tungsten-balanced crankshaft, titanium valves and con-rods and two-ring pistons. Power figures for the R are same as other 1299 models with 150.8 kW (205 hp) @ 11,500 rpm, torque is down 6.2 lb-ft to 100.5 lb-ft (136.2 Nm) @ 10,250 rpm.

The Panigale R comes equipped with passive Öhlins suspension, a difference to the old R spec which used to be equipped with an active setup (DES). Compared to the other variants, wheelbase is increased to 1442 mm (56.77) thanks to new steering geometry. The Panigale 1299 R also comes equipped with the full titanium & carbon fibre Akrapovic Racing Exhaust, which is installed in tandem with the Race Spec ECU. The 1299 Panigale R Final Edition is equipped with an Akrapovič double under-seat exhaust system that is completely made of titanium (Euro 4 approved) derived from the Panigales used by Chaz Davies and Marco Melandri in the World Superbike Championship. The end of 1299 production was announced in 2017 with a Final Edition model.

Weight is 357 lb (162 kg) dry or 406 lb (184 kg) wet.

== 1299 Superleggera ==
In November 2016, Ducati began selling the 1299 Superleggera (Italian for Superlight) in a limited run of 500 units. It succeeded the original 1199 Superleggera of 2014, which reduced weight by having a monocoque, composite carbon fiber chassis, magnesium engine casings, and titanium fasteners and exhaust system. Ducati claimed the 1299 Superleggera had a wet weight of 167 kg (368 lb), and an 1,285 cc (78.4 cu in) engine output of 215 hp (160 kW).
