= Honda X11 =

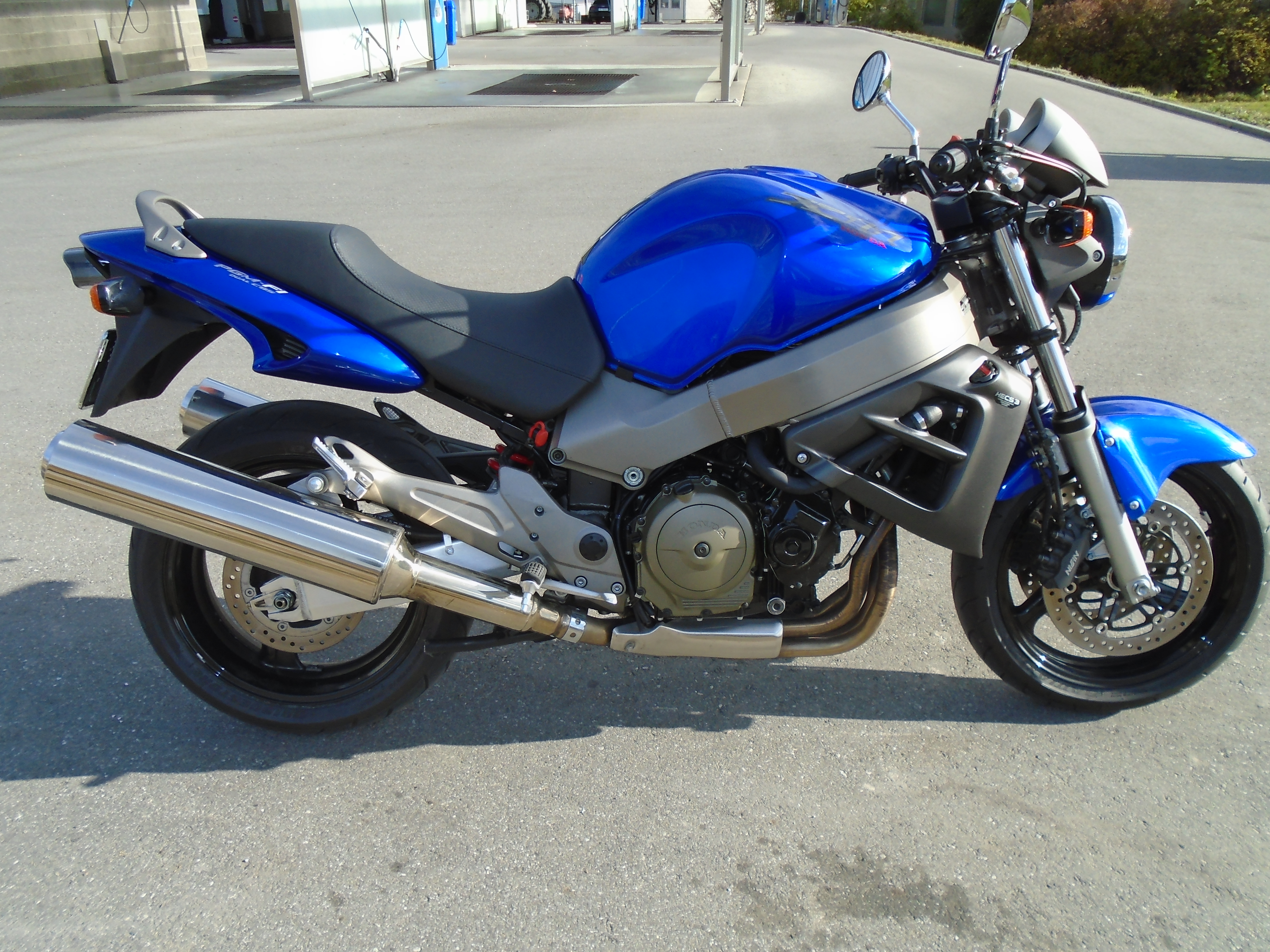
- Manufacturer: Honda
- Also called: Honda CB1100SF
- Production: 1999–2001
- Class: Standard
- Engine: 1,137 cc (69.4 cu in) liquid-cooled 4-stroke 16-valve DOHC inline-4
- Bore / stroke: 79.0 mm × 58.0 mm (3.11 in × 2.28 in)
- Compression ratio: 11.0:1
- Power: 104 kW (139 hp)/9000rpm
- Torque: 116 N⋅m (86 lb⋅ft)/7000rpm
- Transmission: 5-speed
- Rake, trail: 25°, 102 mm (4.0 in)
- Wheelbase: 1,510 mm (59 in)
- Dimensions: L: 2,145 mm (84.4 in); W: 750 mm (30 in); H: 1,115 mm (43.9 in)
- Seat height: 795 mm (31.3 in)
- Weight: 221 kg (487 lb) (dry); 253 kg (558 lb) (wet)
- Fuel capacity: 22 L (4.8 imp gal; 5.8 US gal)
- Fuel consumption: 51.7 mpg_{‑US} (4.55 L/100 km; 62.1 mpg_{‑imp})
- Related: Honda CBR1100XX

The Honda X11 (also called CB1100SF) is a standard motorcycle produced by Honda with a 1,137 cc (69.4 cu in) liquid-cooled, inline-four engine and downforce inducing radiator shroud that increased cooling capacity and stability at high speed. It is based on the CBR1100XX Super Blackbird.

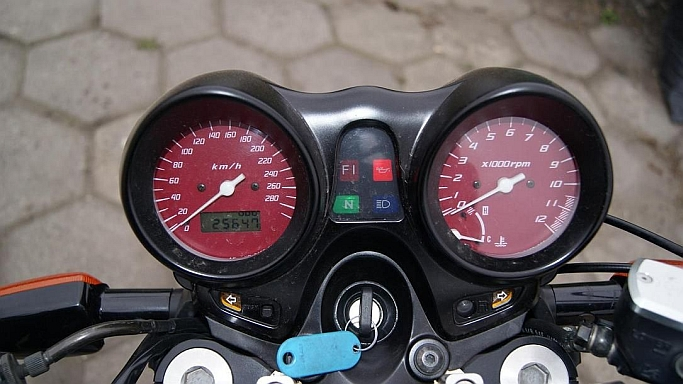
Instrument cluster of the X11

== Features ==
As the Honda X11 was designed as a performance naked motorcycle as opposed to supersports-tourer, it featured a number of differences from the CBR1100XX. It had a modified fueling map which reduced peak power output by 12 bhp to 140 bhp but increased midrange torque to deliver a flat torque curve and very driveable power unit. It featured a five-speed gearbox claimed to be better suited to technical non-highway use. It featured a modified centre-pivot frame that allowed a degree of flex for greater rider feedback. It featured a revised CBS (Dual Combined Braking System) linked braking system tuned to engage less rear brake on the application of the front brake lever to provide a more conventional feel favoured by enthusiastic riders. It featured a single balancer shaft (as opposed to dual) to allow greater mechanical sensation to be transmitted through the seat. It featured rubber-mounted clip-ons to allow greater mechanical sensation to be transmitted through the grips. It featured single section hero blobs on the footpegs as opposed to the triple-section hero blobs to allow greater lean angles to be achieved before the pegs made contact with the ground. Finally, the manufacturer recommended tyre pressure for the front tyre was lower than that of the CBR1100XX reflecting the imagined use case being enthusiastic backroad use as opposed to unrestricted autobahn use. This was advantageous as lower tyre pressures facilitate shorter tyre warming intervals.

== Styling ==
The Honda X11 featured a number of characteristic styling traits. It featured a bulbous fuel tank which took inspiration from Honda's mass centralization design philosophy. The tank had a generous 22-litre capacity which gave it a very useful 220-mile range. It featured an automotive looking plastic radiator shroud that attempted to combat the twin challenges faced by naked bikes of poor radiator cooling efficiency and poor high-speed stability by effectively channelling air to the radiator, and by incorporating an aerodynamic lip that generated downforce at higher speeds. It also featured a plastic shroud for the instrument cluster designed to combat discomfort often felt when riding naked bikes at highway speeds caused by wind buffeting by diffusing air around the rider increasing comfort. This was effective in reducing buffeting at up to 85 mph / 137 km/h.

The stacked headlight of the CBR1100XX was replaced by a standard round H4 headlight typical of naked motorcycles. The twin exhausts of the CBR1100XX were retained.

== Performance ==
Performance was incredible for a naked motorcycle at the time of release in 1999 with a 1/4 mile sprint of 10.8 seconds. This performance level is comparable with contemporary performance naked motorcycles such as the Yamaha MT10 which records a 1/4 mile sprint of 10.6 seconds. It had a maximum speed of 157 mph / 252 km/h.
