= Ducati 1199 =

Italian motorcycle

Ducati 1199 Panigale
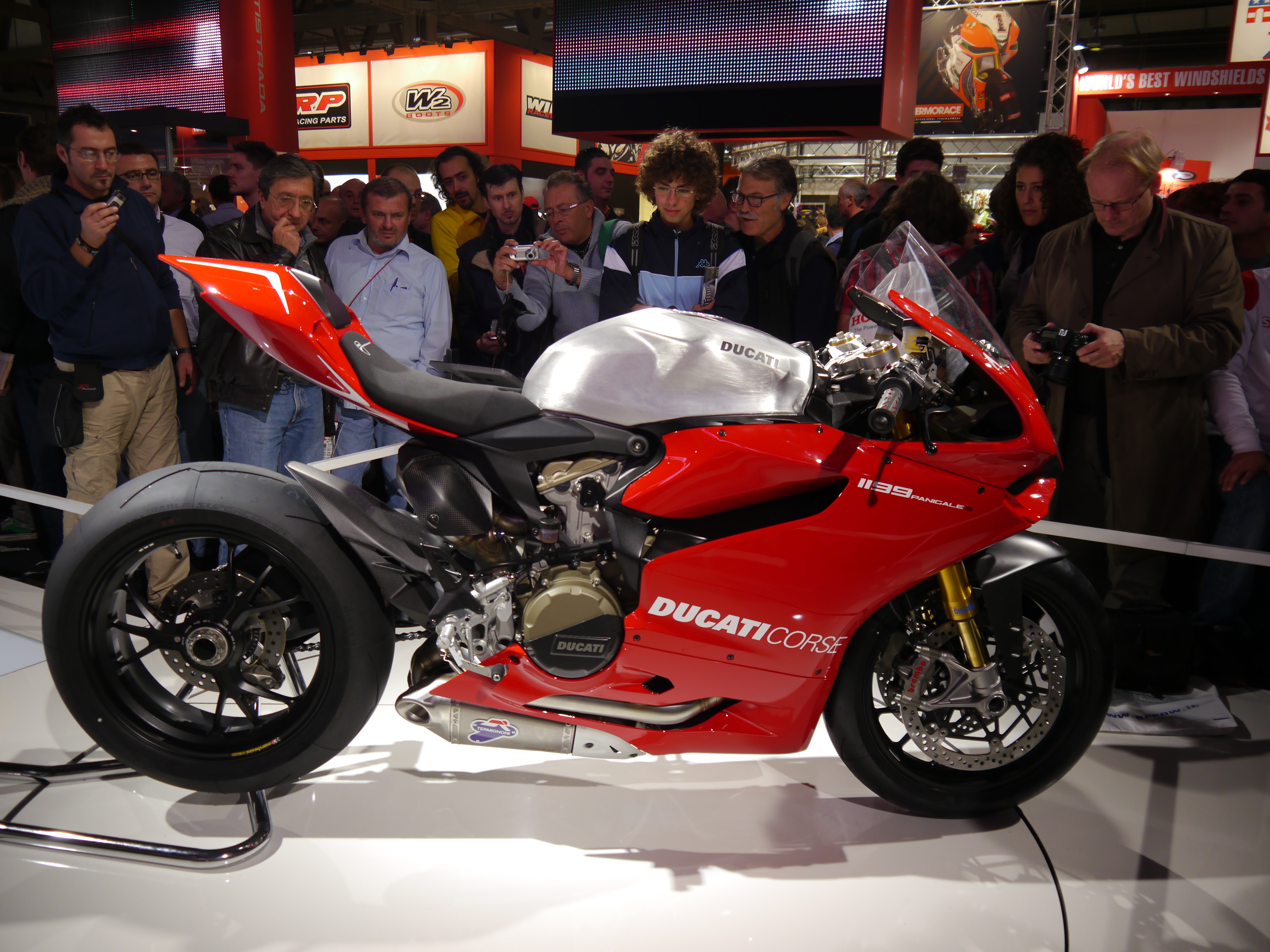
- Manufacturer: Ducati
- Production: 2012–2014
- Predecessor: 1198
- Successor: 1299
- Class: Sport bike
- Engine: 1,198 cc (73.1 cu in) Liquid cooled 4-valve/cyl desmodromic 90° L-twin
- Bore / stroke: 112 mm × 60.8 mm (4.41 in × 2.39 in)
- Compression ratio: 12.5:1
- Top speed: 177.6 mph (285.8 km/h)
- Power: 128.1 kW (171.8 hp) (S) (rear wheel)
- Torque: 117.1 N⋅m (86.4 lb⋅ft) (S) (rear wheel)
- Transmission: 6-speed constant-mesh sequential manual, wet multi-plate slipper clutch, chain-drive
- Frame type: Aluminum monocoque
- Suspension: Front: Fully adjustable 50 mm (2.0 in) Marzocchi (base); 43 mm (1.7 in) Öhlins w/ electronic compression, rebound adj. (S and S Tricolore)
- Brakes: Front: Brembo radial monobloc calipers, 2×330 mm (13 in) semi-floating discs Rear: 245 mm (9.6 in) disc (ABS optional)
- Tires: Pirelli Diablo Supercorsa SP Front: 3.5"×17" 120/70 ZR17. Rear: 6"×17" 200/55 ZR17; Wheels: 10-spoke alloy (base), 3-spoke forged (S and S Tricolore)
- Rake, trail: 24.5°, 100mm
- Wheelbase: 1,437 mm (56.6 in)
- Seat height: 825 mm (32.5 in)
- Weight: Claimed: 164 kg (362 lb) (base) 164 kg (362 lb) (S) 166.5 kg (367 lb) (S Tricolore) (dry); 193 kg (425 lb). (wet)
- Related: Ducati 899

The Ducati 1199 Panigale is a 1,198 cc (73.1 cu in) Ducati sport bike introduced at the 2011 Milan Motorcycle Show. The motorcycle is named after the small manufacturing town of Borgo Panigale. Ducati announced a larger displacement 1,285 cc (78.4 cu in) 1299 Panigale for the 2015 model year.

== Specifications ==
At the time of its release Ducati claimed that the 1199 Panigale was the world's most powerful production twin-cylinder engine motorcycle, with 195 bhp (145 kW) at 10,750 rpm, and 133.0 N⋅m (98.1 lb⋅ft) torque at 9000 rpm on an engine test stand. With a claimed dry weight of 164 kg (362 lb) and a curb weight of 188 kg (414 lb). Ducati said the 1199 had the highest power-to-weight and torque-to-weight ratios of production motorcycles.

Motorcycle Consumer News tested the 2012 Panigale S at 128.1 kW (171.8 hp) and 117.1 N⋅m (86.4 lb⋅ft) torque at the rear wheel, with a wet weight 193 kg (425 lb). They measured a 0 to 60 mph (0 to 97 km/h) time of 2.98 seconds, a 0 to 1/4 mi (0.00 to 0.40 km) time of 9.91 seconds at 145.95 mph (234.88 km/h), and a top speed to 177.6 mph (285.8 km/h). Braking performance was 60 to 0 mph (97 to 0 km/h) in 119.1 ft (36.3 m) and average fuel economy was 6.9 L/100 km; 41.1 mpg_{‑imp} (34.2 mpg_{‑US}). Motorcycle Consumer News ranked the 2012 Panigale S with the best rear wheel horsepower to wet weight ratio, 1:2.47, of any bike the magazine had ever tested, as well as the 5th highest rear wheel horsepower, and the 10th highest top speed.

The new Superquadro engine is exceptionally oversquare, with a bore:stroke ratio of 1.84:1. Whereas previous Ducatis had belt-driven overhead cams, this engine's valvetrain uses gears and chain. The engine serves as a stressed member, making the Panigale smaller and lighter than a conventionally framed motorcycle.

The 1199 is also one of the first production sports motorcycles to feature electronically adjustable suspension. Rebound and compression damping is adjusted electronically while pre-load is still adjusted manually. The 1199's exhaust system and mufflers are underneath the engine, and not beneath the seat as on previous models, such as the 1198 and 1098.

== 1199 Panigale R ==
Ducati 1199 Panigale R
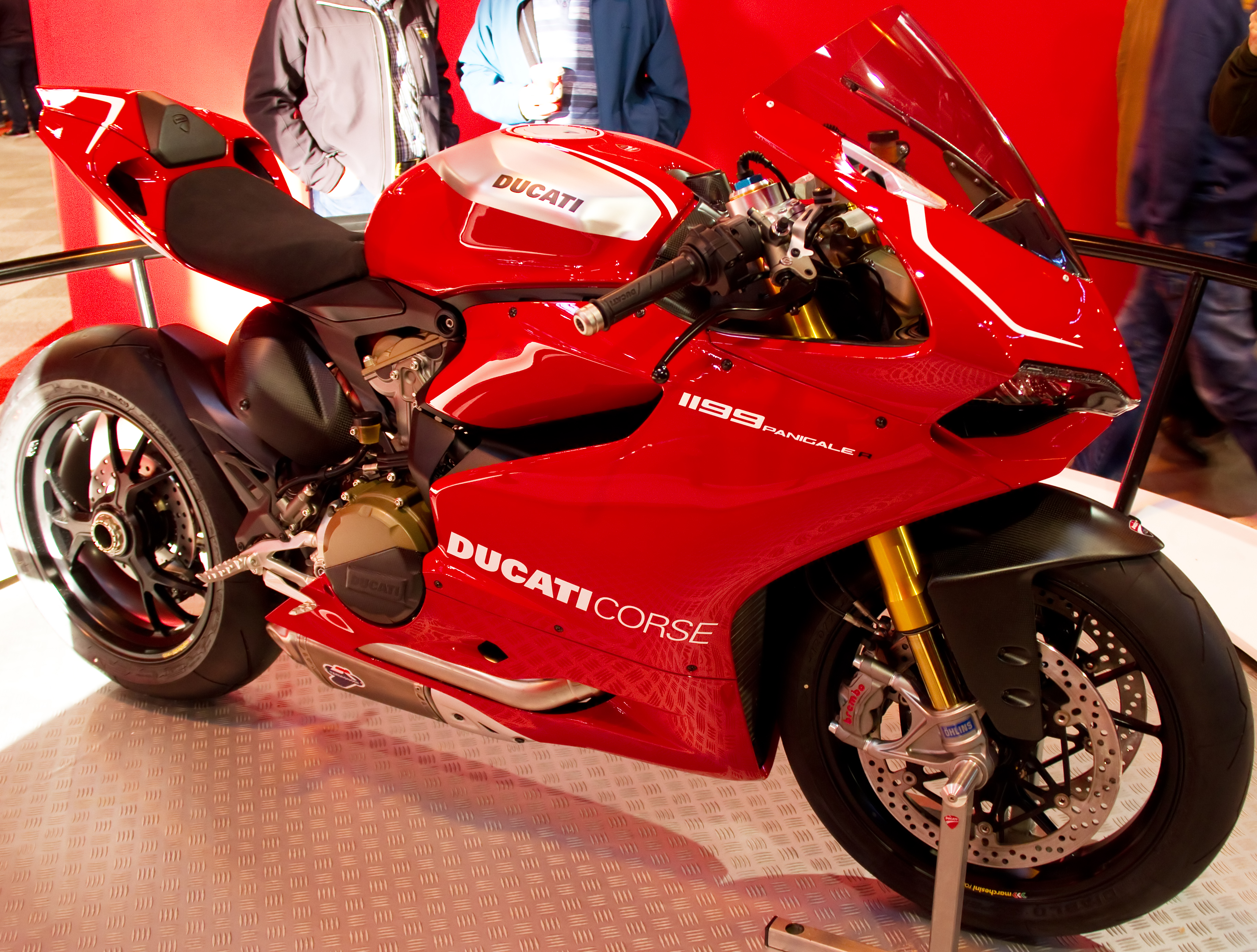
- Manufacturer: Ducati
- Production: 2013–2014
- Class: World Superbike homologation special
- Engine: 1,198 cc (73.1 cu in) Liquid cooled 4-valve/cyl. desmodromic 90° V-twin
- Bore / stroke: 112 mm × 60.8 mm (4.41 in × 2.39 in)
- Compression ratio: 12.5:1
- Top speed: 299–325 km/h (186–202 mph)
- Power: 151 kW (202 hp) (claimed); 126 kW (169 hp) (rear wheel)
- Torque: 100 pound force-feet (140 N⋅m)
- Transmission: 6 speed, wet multi-plate slipper clutch, chain drive
- Frame type: Aluminum monocoque
- Suspension: Electronically adjustable
- Weight: Claimed: 165 kg (364 lb) (dry); 189 kg (417 lb) (wet)

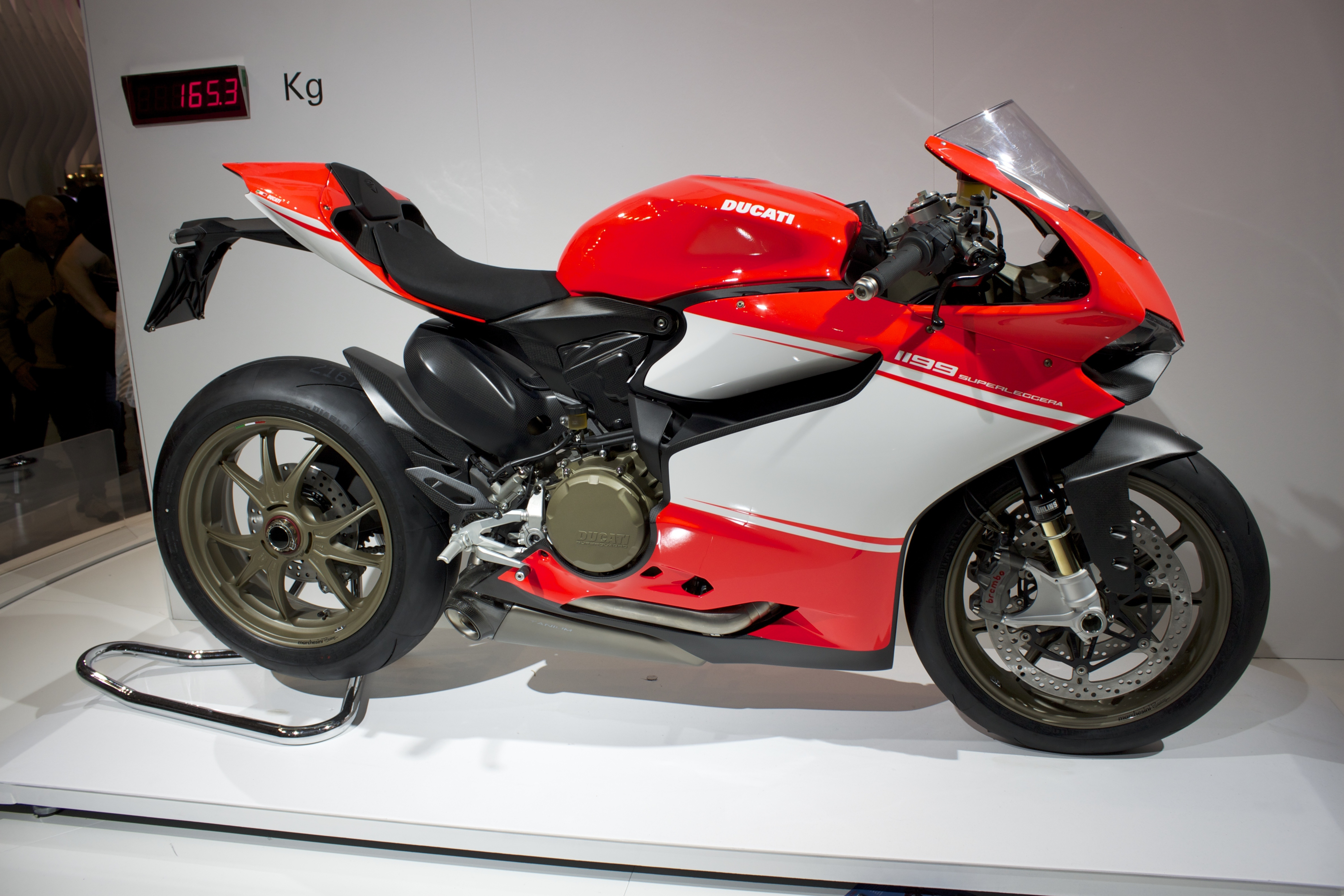
Ducati 1199 Superleggera

In 2012, Ducati added the 1199 Panigale R World Superbike homologation model for the 2013 model year. It has lightened engine internals, including titanium connecting rods, and carbon fiber external parts, raising power to 145 kW (195 hp) and 151 kW (202 hp) with the track only exhaust and reducing weight to 364 pounds (165 kg).

The top speed of the Panigale R was estimated by Road & Track to be 202 miles per hour (325 km/h) with the track only Termignoni exhaust system it ships with, which they apparently derived from the speed at which the bike hits the rev limiter, assuming nominal gearing and wheel size.

== Panigale S Senna ==
In 2013, Ducati again released a variant of their top of the range sportbike – this time the 1199 Panigale S Senna – dedicated to Formula 1 World Champion, Ayrton Senna. The predecessor was based on the 916 released in 1994; in both instances, net proceeds were donated to the Instituto Ayrton Senna charity.

== 1199 Superleggera ==
In 2014, Ducati launched the 1199 Superleggera (English: Superlight). The philosophy behind this motorcycle was the largest reduction of weight possible, achieved through the use of exotic materials such as magnesium (particularly the monocoque frame), carbon and titanium. This resulted in a dry weight of 155 kg (342 lb), and a wet weight of 177 kg (390 lb). A total of 500 were produced.

== Racing ==
In the September 2012 Le Mans 24-Hours Motorcycle Endurance Race, a Team Scuderia Zone Rouge Ducati 1199 Panigale won the Open category, finishing 32nd overall. The riders were Stéphane Pagani, Phillipe Teissier and Hervé Royer.

Ducati finished second in the 2015 Superbike World Championship season, with Chaz Davies having 5 wins and finished second in the 2017 championship. Leandro Mercado won the riders title during the 2014 FIM Superstock 1000 Cup season. Ducati later took the manufacture title in 2016 and the rider title in 2017 with rider Michael Ruben Rinaldi.

Ducati won the British Superbike Championship in 2016 and 2017 with rider Shane "Shakey" Byrne, who rode for the factory supported PBM Be Wiser Ducati Team.

In road racing, Glen Irwin took his Panigale R to victory in 2017 at the North West 200 using the PBM Be Wiser Ducati. He also won the Macau Grand Prix in the same year.

== Film ==
A purple 1199 Panigale was in the movie Kick-Ass 2, ridden by Hit-Girl.

== See also ==
- List of fastest production motorcycles by acceleration

Records
Preceded by MV Agusta F4 R 312	Fastest production motorcycle 2013-2016	Succeeded by Kawasaki Ninja H2R
