= Ducati 996R =

2001 Ducati 996R Superbike

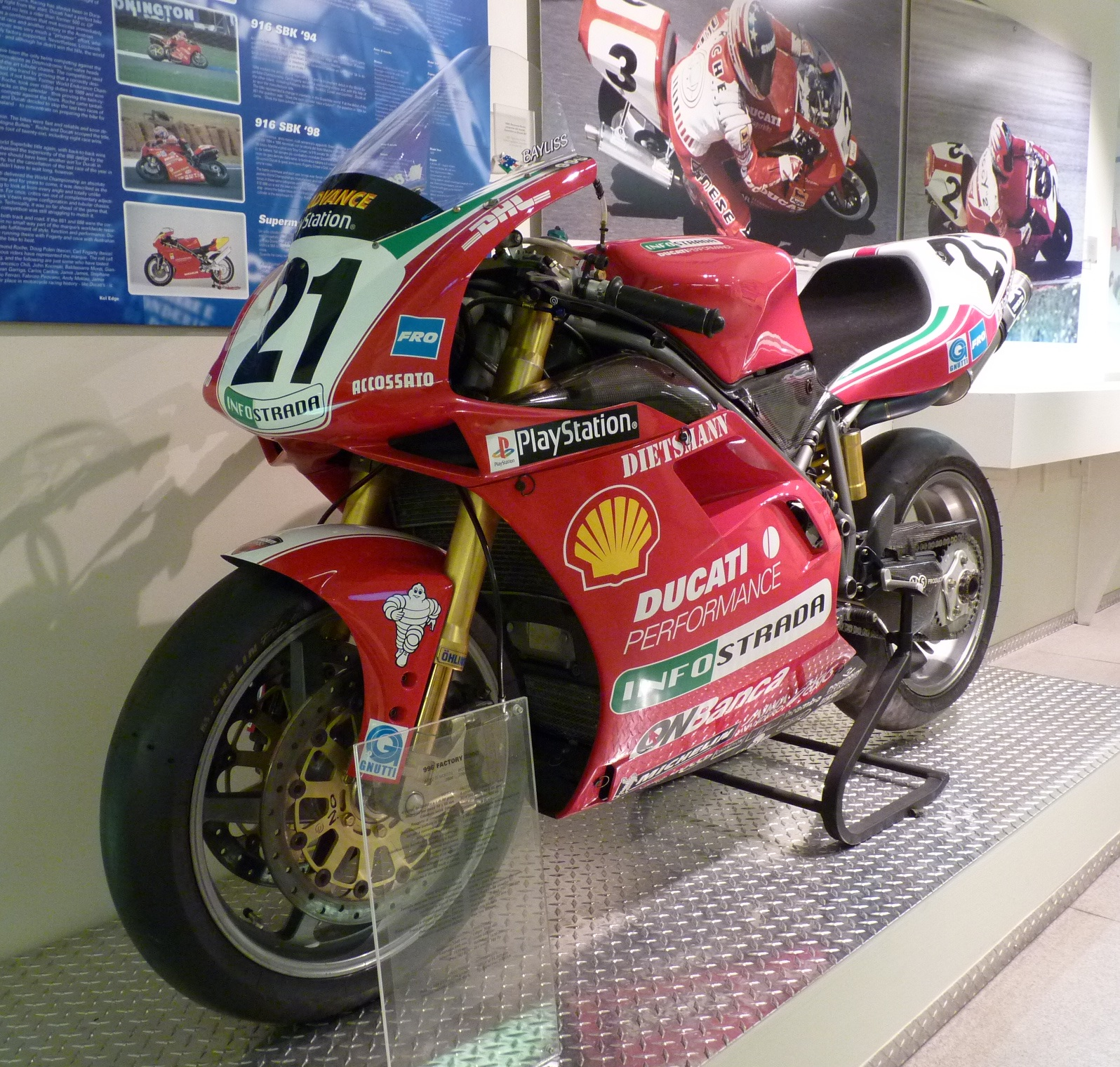
- Manufacturer: Ducati Motor SpA
- Production: 2001
- Predecessor: Ducati 996 SPS
- Successor: Ducati 998R
- Class: Superbike
- Engine: 998 cc (61 cu in) Testastretta, 90° L-twin, fuel injected 4 valve per cylinder desmodromic, liquid cooled
- Bore / stroke: 100.0 mm × 63.5 mm (3.94 in × 2.50 in)
- Compression ratio: 11.4:1
- Top speed: 282 km/h (175 mph)
- Power: 135 hp (100.0 kW) @ 10200 rpm
- Torque: 101 Nm (10.3 kg-m) @ 8000 rpm
- Transmission: 6 speed, chain drive
- Frame type: Tubular chromoly "Kyalami" trellis frame + Foggy's '00 geometry
- Suspension: Front: Öhlins with TiN upside-down fork fully adjustable, 120 mm (4.7 in) wheel travel Rear: Öhlins progressive cantilever linkage with adjustable monoshock, 130 mm (5.1 in) wheel travel
- Brakes: Front: 2 x 320 mm semi-discs, 4-piston 4-pads calipers Rear: Single 220 mm disc, 2-piston caliper
- Tires: Front: 120/70 ZR17; Rear: 190/50 ZR17
- Wheelbase: 1,410 mm (55.5 in)
- Seat height: 790 mm (31.1 in)
- Weight: 185 kg (408 lb) (wet)
- Fuel capacity: 17 litres (4.5 US gal) (4 litres (1.1 US gal) reserve)

The Ducati 996R is a Ducati Superbike motorcycle manufactured in 2001 as the special homologation model for the World Superbike racing series 2001 season. Based upon the Ducati 996 and using the new 998cc Testastretta engine, it was the next evolution from the 996SPS (Sports Production Special) and the venerated brands first ever "R" model.

== Development ==
The original 916 had debuted in 1994 and had always raced with a 955cc Desmoquattro engine until the 996cc came out in 1998. Honda had stepped in to take the Championship in 2000 away from Carl Fogarty who had won in 1999. It was clear that if Ducati were to take back the title in 2001 they needed a drastic revision of their engine. Central to this was the search for higher revs and improved cylinder filing and combustion. 2001 would also make the 8th production year for the Massimo Tamburini generation Superbike, so it had many wondering if in addition to the new engine, that a new bike design would debut as well.

Once the formula and design parameters for the new engine were established in early 1998, an outside consultant was engaged to design the Desmodromic cylinder head. Ex-F1 engineer, Angiolino Marchetti came with over 30 years of experience and already had previously business dealings with Ducati.

Marchetti commenced on the new head design in early 1998. But unfortunately died in 1999 without seeing the project completed. During 1999 three examples of the 998 were produced, and early in 2000, Luca Cadalora tested the Testastretta on the track. Although this engine had the new crank-case and shorter stroke, it still didn't feature the Testastretta cylinder heads.

== Public launch ==
The 996R was first teased to the industry at the Intermot show in Monaco, however Ducati officially "debuted" the new Testastretta engine and the 996R at the Munich International Motorcycle Show (Intermot) in Germany the week of 11 September 2000. It then went up on the newly redesigned Ducati.com around the same time with an online pre-order date of 12 Sept announced. No doubt all this hype contributed to the online pre-order allocations selling out so quickly as this all coincided at the same time after several months of rumours and anticipation.

The 996R has the distinction of being the first ever "R" version Ducati in its Superbike line-up. The 996R was the race homologation special for the all new Testastretta (meaning "compact head") 998cc engine that Ducati was campaigning in World Superbike for the 2001 season. Troy Bayliss swept the championship that year on a 996F01 (the factory race version of the 996R) in his debut season after Fogarty had to retire in late 2000 due to an injury. In addition to the new 998cc engine, the 996R also set the design language for what the upcoming 998 and 748 model line-up would look like for 2002. It also led to the 998R and 748R in 2002.

The 996R made its motorcycle journalist test rider debut 7 March 2001 at the Circuit de Valencia race track in Valencia, Spain. For the occasion, the 996Rs were set up with the "upgrade kit" which includes free carbon 50mm Termignoni exhaust cans and a reprogrammed control unit (all included in the purchase price of the bike). The power rises to 141 horsepower.

Through the Ducati Performance catalogue via dealers, there was also full 54mm system with ECU that increased the power to an advertised 149HP. Dealers that took the 996R racing like Pro V Twins in the UK and AMS in Texas, USA were able to easily extract 150HP+ on the dyno just massaging the timing on top of the full 54mm exhaust.

There was a full 57mm race-only Titanium exhaust that required a spacer for the right rear set and a different (or cut/modified) tail section to clear the carbon heat shield and rear of the cans, all available via Ducati Performance. There are no advertised HP numbers on this as the ECU tuning was up to the customer and not covered by warranty at this point. However, it is known than the 996RS Desmoquattro was estimated to have 168HP and the factory Testastretta F01 bikes had around 174HP and both of those bikes used the 57mm exhaust system. Of course it goes without saying that these bikes had numerous other serious race upgrades, but aside from F01 specific components, all of them were available via Ducati Performance to anyone with the P/N and the money.

== Specifications ==
This is best broken down into two sections; Upgrades/carry-overs from the 996 SPS, and what was totally new.

Upgrades/carry-overs from the 996 SPS:

- Frame - The 996R has what's known as the "Kyalami" frame. This means the main trellis structure has been modified for the larger carbon air-box to accommodate the new Testastretta throttle bodies and shower injectors. On the R it also incorporates some slight geometry tweaks implemented on Foggy's 2000 F00 he wanted carried over to the F01. The tubular trellis frame is constructed out of TIG-welded chrome-molybdenum and saw thicker 12mm engine mounts and upgraded 2mm walled tubing implemented for the R. An aluminium rear subframe was also standard as the R was not offered in anything but Monoposto.
- Öhlins - The front forks and rear shock and spring remained unchanged from the SPS. The upside-down forks (treated with titanium nitrate) and the rear shock absorber, which works on a single-sided swingarm, offer the possibility of any type of regulation.
- Exhaust - The R carried over the full 50mm exhaust system from the SPS but it was modified to accommodate the new cylinder heads and wrap around the engines new deep sump oil pan.
- Carbon-Fibre - The R carried over the carbon air-box, front fender, oil cooler surround, rear number plate holder, under-tail section, chain guard, and exhaust heat shield from the SPS. The nose and tail are still plastic on the 996R.
- Colour - The SPS and bikes previous to it (Varese red excluded) are painted "Rosso Ducati" (PPG 473.101). The 996R and 998R are painted "Anniversary Ducati" (PPG 487.111) for the 75th anniversary of Ducati. Anniversary is a brighter shade of red compared to the old Rosso. The frame kept the gloss "Grigio Metallic Ducati" (PPG 291.601) which came out just the year prior on the 2000 SPS which was a welcome change from the matte bronze previously used.

Totally new for the 996R:

- Engine - The new Testastretta engine has a 100mm bore x 63.5mm, 11.4:1 compressions ratio, and put out 135 hp @10,200RPM (at rear sprocket) and 77 lb/ft (105 nm) @8,000RPM. Verified to dyno at 132 at the rear tyre. Previous valve angle had been 40 degrees. Marchetti and Bordi settled on a 25 degree included valve angle allowing for more of a direct path for the air to the intake valve. Testastretta, means narrower - and slimmer as in diet – head The Testastretta opening valve rockers were positioned outside the camshafts, enabling the cams to be closer together. Improvement were also made to the camshaft construction & specification, and larger valves were of course employed. The 996R intake ports were larger to match and the throttle bodies were increased to 54mm with elliptical chokes. The opening rockers arms were 50% lighter, closing rockers were 20% lighter - without compromising strength. An important development was that arrangement of the rocker arm axes to provide symmetrical opening, always a problem on the earlier Desmoquattro. The new arrangement optimised the side thrust on the valves. Thanks to improved tooling, the rocker arm pad now matched the cam continuously throughout its rotation, resulting in considerably reduced clearance between the valve adjusters and the rocker arms. The valve guides and seats were then machined simultaneously for perfect valve sealing. The extreme angle of the between the upper and lower timing belt pulleys the Desmoquattro suffered from was also vastly improved.
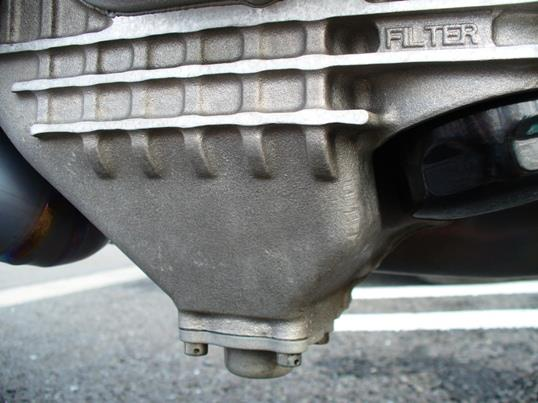
  The sand cast deep sump.
  Titanium valves and Pankle Titanium connecting rods. Pistal pistons - the larger 100mm pistons were 30 grams lighter than the previous and improvements were made to the rings to reduce blow-by oil loss. The new Nikasil plated cylinders were more compact due to more efficient water passages. The cylinders were rotated 10 degrees backward to assist gravity oil scavenging from the front cylinder. The 996R had a sand cast engine case, deep sump, and heads due the limited production. 996R had hand built engines being the first Testastretta. That and minor internal engine block cooling duct mods. The crank-cases were redesigned to reduce weight, improve lubrication, and generally strengthened to cope with World Superbike form. The deeper sump addresses oil starvation that were present on the earlier Desmoquattro under high-G forces. Several other changes were made to the oiling system as well. One of these was that the cams received oil after the oil cooler now instead of before, allowing also for a change from roller bearing to modern journal bearings. The new engine weighed 3 kilos less than the previous.
- Front Brakes - The front braking system was an all-new top of the line system re-engineered by Brembo just for the 996R. Here are some quotes from a MotorBox interview at Intermot 2000: Pierre Terblanche, "Where the 996R is all new is in the front braking system. Pump, calipers, discs, nothing was spared by the Brembo technicians. The master cylinder with piston diameter reduced from 16 to 15 mm ensures greater pressure to the system, but the main novelty lies in the four-pad calipers that are much stiffer than the previous ones. The four pistons have a diameter of 34 mm, each one acts on a pad, in this way they double the "leading edges" or the edges that first come into contact with the disc (area where there is the greatest braking force). With the same braking force, this type of caliper requires a lower oil delivery (a fact which compensates for the smaller diameter of the pump), the proof of the facts you therefore get more powerful braking and less effort to apply to the lever." "The discs also contribute to the super braking of the 996R. The braking surfaces are lower but have a greater average radius. The reduced thickness from 5 to 4.5 mm and the use of a lightened flange then made it possible to save almost a kilogram (910 g) in a fundamental area for handling" "Can 910 grams change the dynamic behaviour of a motorcycle? Yes, if those "few" grams are on the front wheel and spinning. The 996 has never been a bike that "falls" when cornering, not even the "R" is, but that little weight removed from discs and flanges has led to a perceptible increase in the speed of descent when cornering"
- ECU - Ducati IAW-59M ECU made by Magneti Marelli. Replaced the much larger P8. First CANBUS ECU. First fully re-programmable ECU - lots of tuning software, cables. maps and definition files. The new and much more compact 5.9M Marelli was 80 grams lighter than the old P8 ECU, with a new 20Mhz processor, compared to the P8s 16Mhz. The memory was increased from 8 to 32MB and the system provided much more efficient engine management. Rather than the P8 system which used a separate RPM sensor and injection timing sensor, the new 5.9M was similar in design to the 1.6M with a single inductive pickup. This faced the timing gear, reading the 46 teeth and a gap equal in size to two teeth, but still required accurate meshing of the crankshaft and timing gears to provide perfect RPM information.
- Carbon-Fibre Side Fairings & Belly Pan - MS Production was the OEM for Ducati and Ducati Performance carbon-fibre components. The 996R was the first production line Ducati to have full carbon side fairings. Previously the SPS had only a CF front fender and air-box. A cool effect can be seen on 996R side fairings is the weave of the carbon printing through due to paint shrinkage over the years - just like a Ferrari F40. Portions of the carbon were left unpainted such as the lower NACA duct, the top edge where the heat vent screen is, and the lettering of the DUCATI 996R. Then the panels were clear coated. On the inside of the panels are heat-shields to protect them from high heat areas.
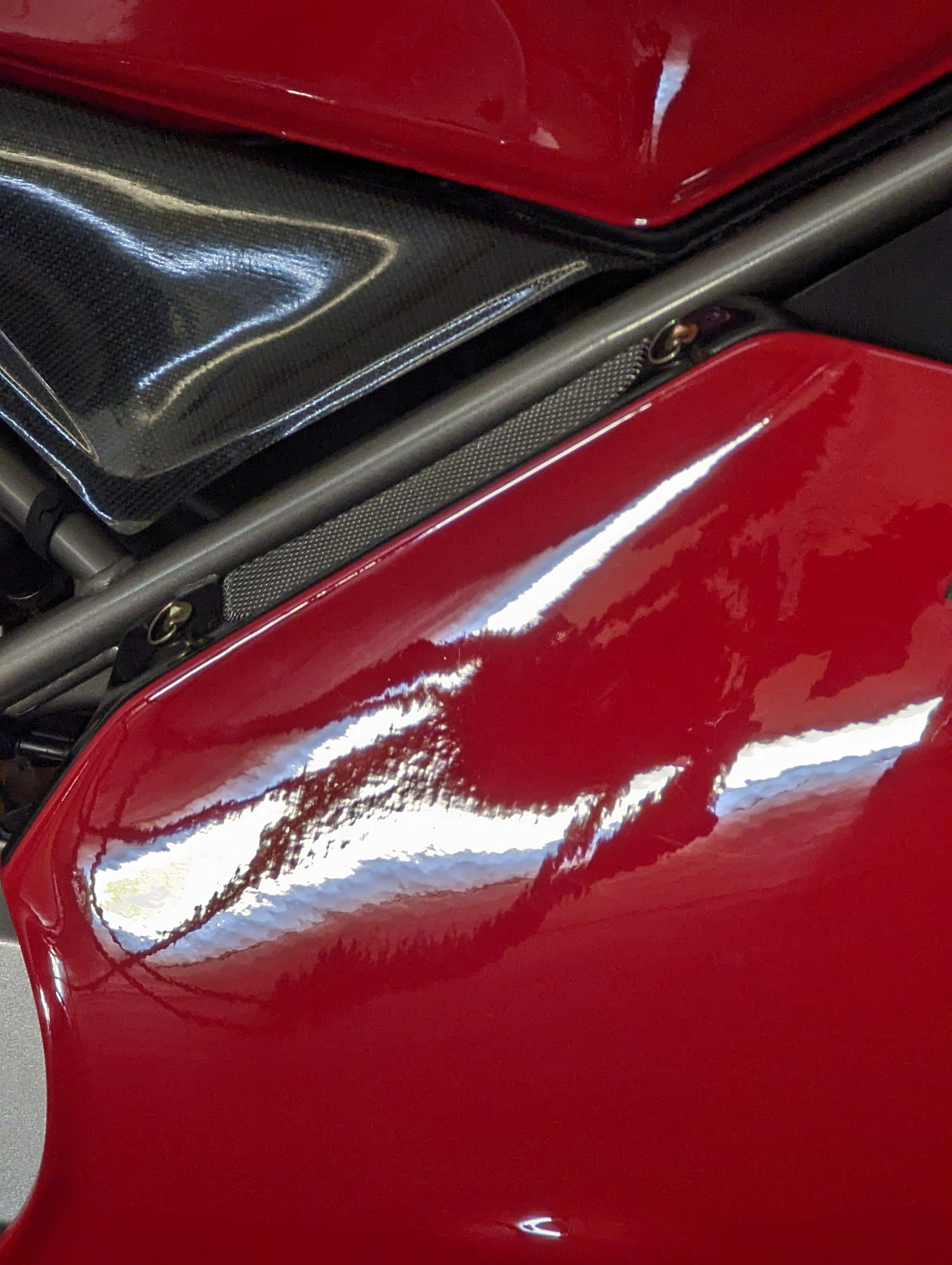
  With the light hitting just right, you can clearly see the weave of the carbon like on an F40.
  The coils need to be mounted outside of the main frame rails otherwise they hit the new, larger, throttle body setup. This was one of the reasons for the smoother fairing design. The old duct in the side of the older model side fairings interferes with the new coil location otherwise. Pierre Terblanche "The air vents on the sides have disappeared, not for an aesthetic quirk, say the Ducati technicians, but once again for the search for the best performance. The hot air from the radiators now vents through two grates in the upper part of the fairing (at knee height, to be clear), an area in itself subject to aerodynamic turbulence, removing it from the sides of the fairing, an area that is critical from an aerodynamic point of view . This apparently trivial change made it possible to reduce the Cx x S coefficient from 0.34 to 0.33 , sufficient to improve the top speed by more than 5 km/h."

The 996R does not have the two air vents at the rider's knees, but has a NACA intake plus a lower one, near the belly pan. These modifications are due to an aerodynamic issue: the 996 R has a Cx of 0.33 (while the base 996 has 0.34) and this allows it to increase the top speed by over 5 km/h.

- Lighter Weight - "The R has given itself a diet. The engine has dropped by 3 kg (from 74 to 71), the electronic control unit has shaved off 700 grams, the fairings, in highly prized carbon, have dropped by 1.5 kg. Overall, 7 kg have been saved over the previous SPS. The 996R weighs 185 kg (407 lbs) with water, oil and petrol."
- Sealed Battery - New for the 996R and for the Testastretta generation of engines were the more compact, lightweight batteries. These required an all new battery tray and a retrofit tray was made available for owners of 996/748/916 bikes to fit the new batteries into their larger battery tray. Significant for this battery was that it was an AGM type battery which did not require being filled with electrolyte fluid. As such, it was also a sealed maintenance-free battery.

== Accessories ==
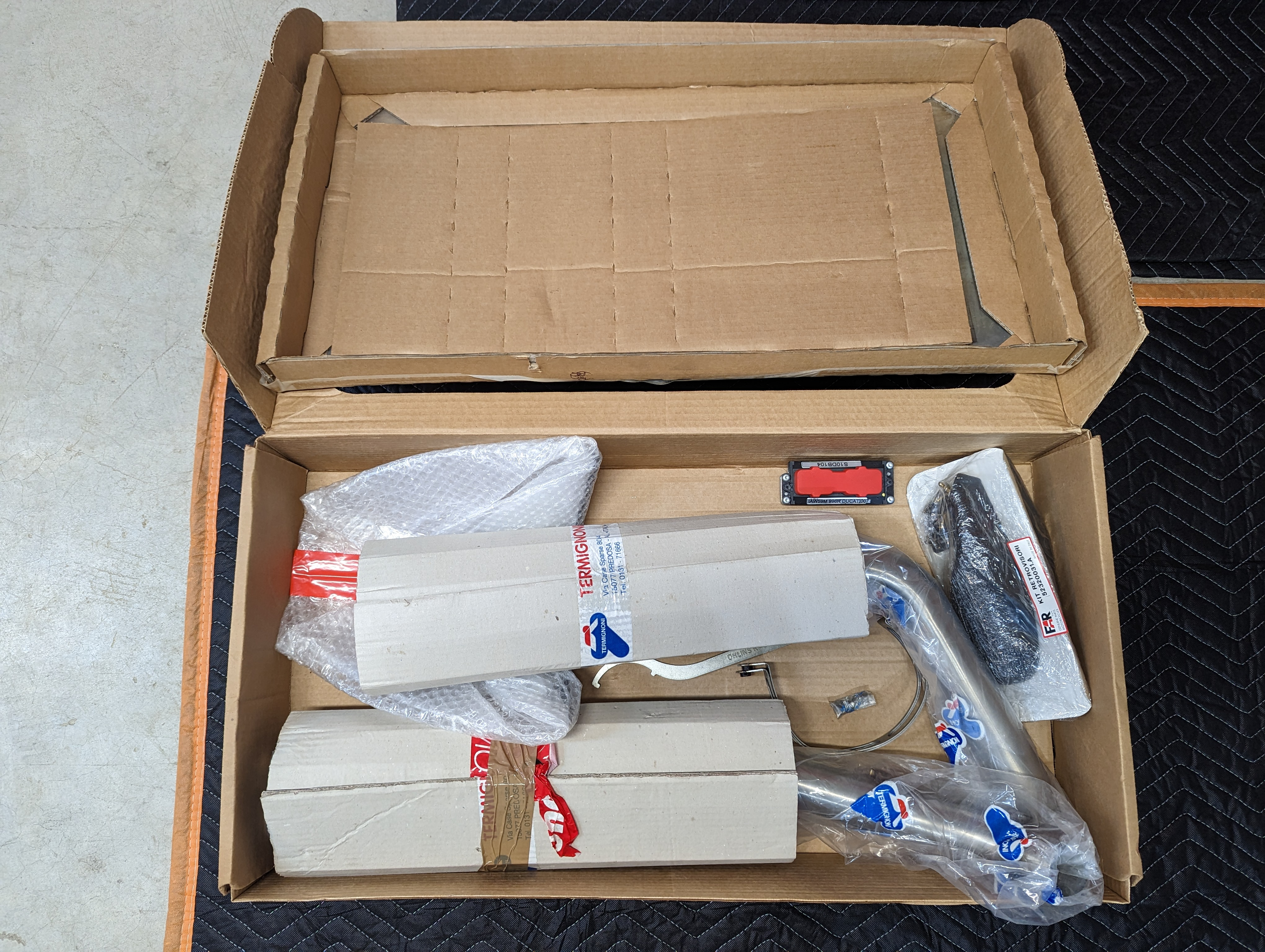
Original "Accessories" box with all of its original parts untouched

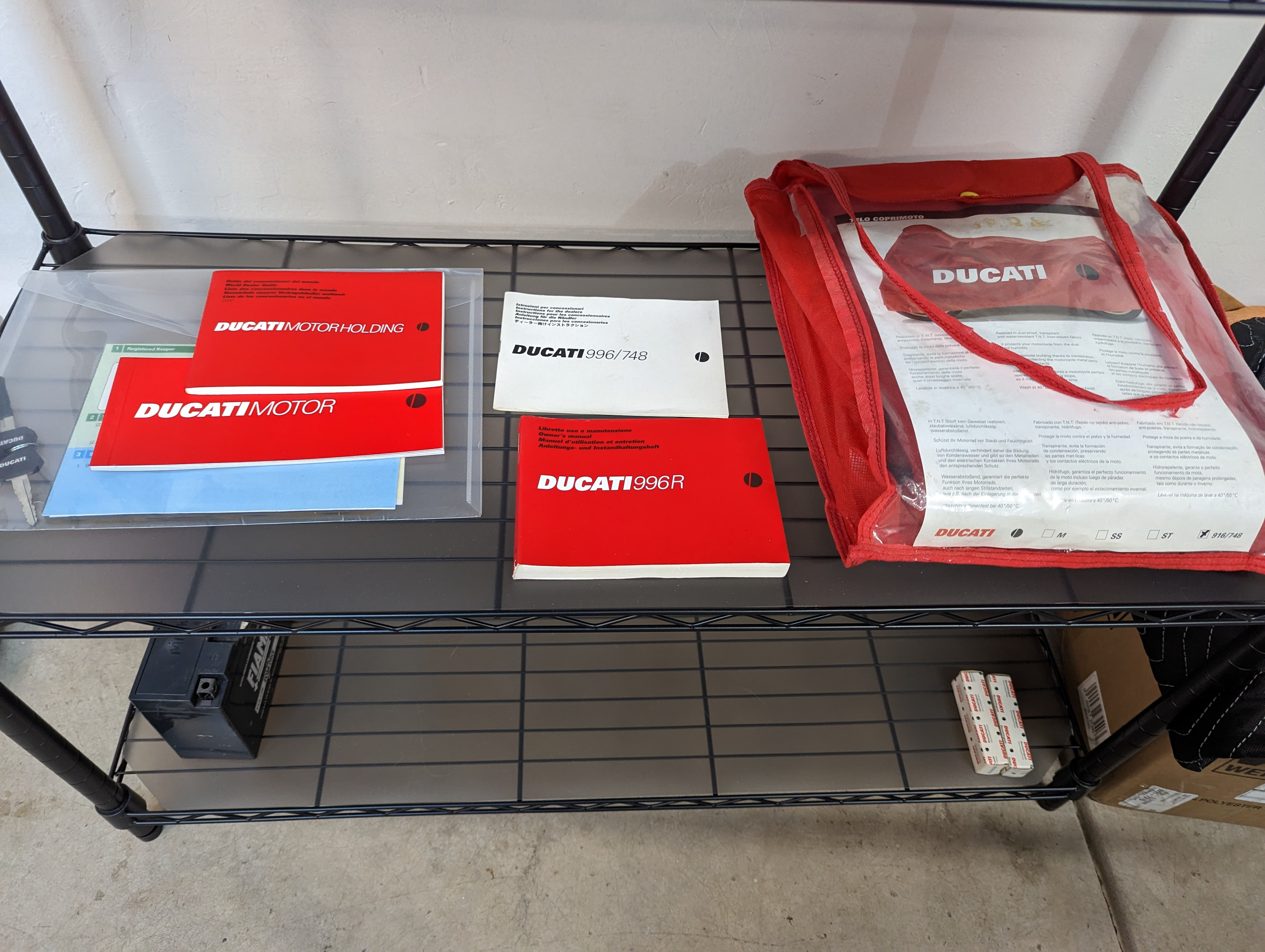
Original dust cover in its bag with manuals/booklets for a UK market bike.

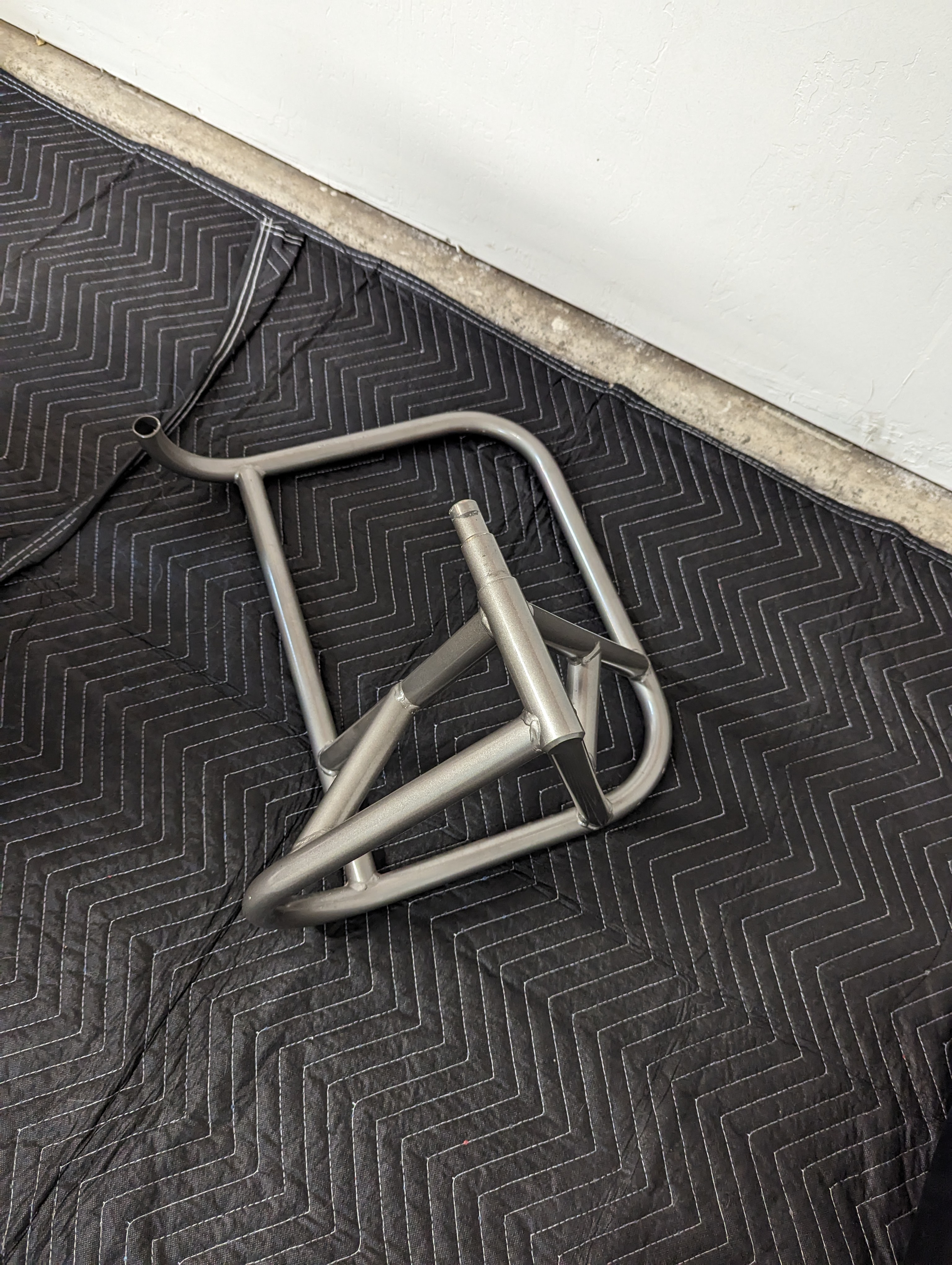
Rear "display" stand. Colour matched to the frame.

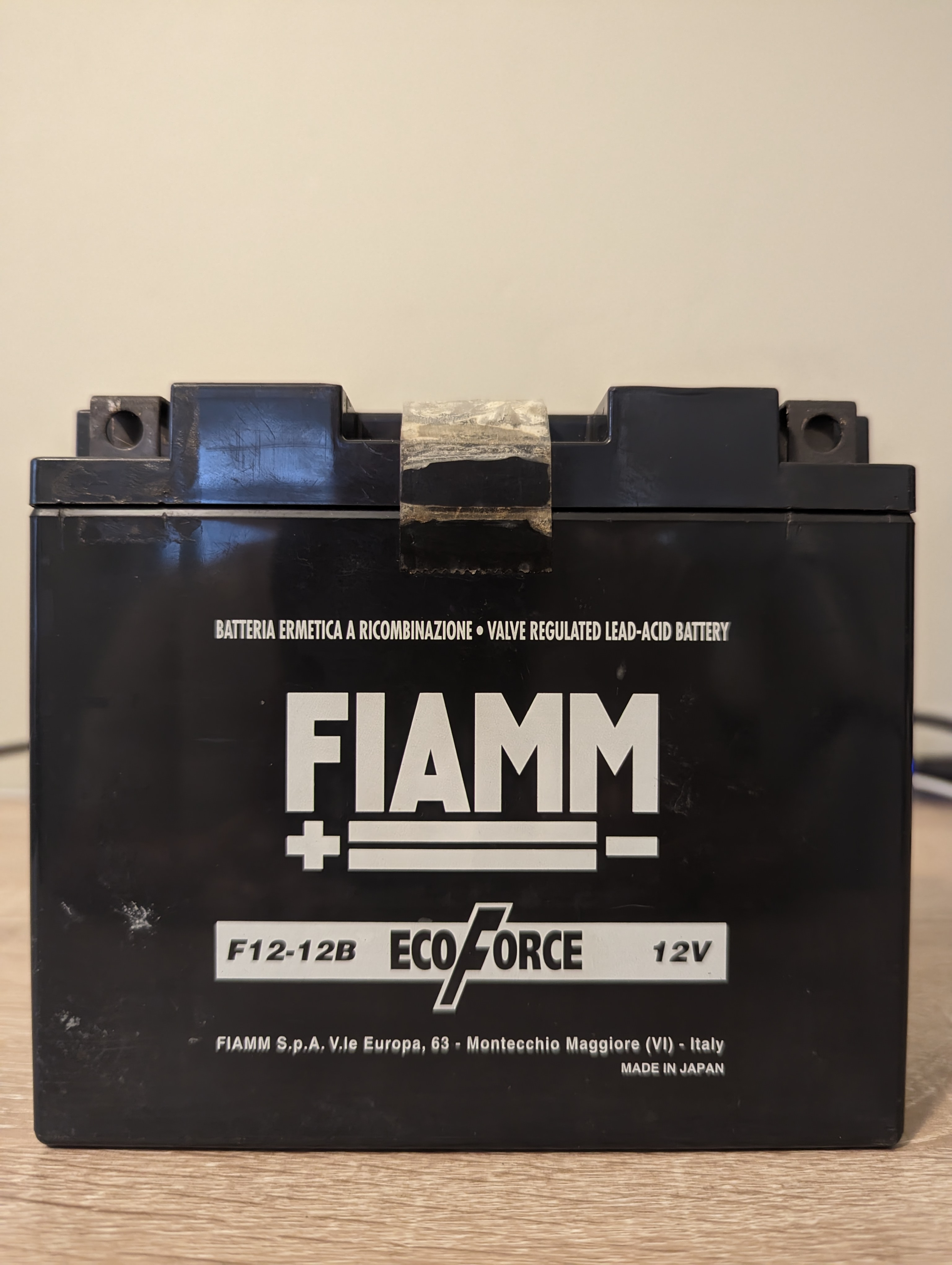
An original, never installed, FIAMM battery as it came from the Ducati factory for domestic market bikes (EU/UK).

As had become tradition for to Ducati to include with their limited edition bikes, the 996R shipped with the following components:

- Display stand painted to match the frame colour. These were shipped with the bikes and were referred to as shipping/display stands. They could be somewhat difficult to use and were not known for being very stable. As such, some dealers threw them away and the owners purchased proper rear paddock stands.
- Indoor dust cover - This was made out of a very fragile but extremely breathable paper fibre based fabric. It was not meant for long term use and they simply fall apart with age. They can not be washed and they do impart micro-marring onto the painted surfaces. These were used as dust covers over the bikes shipped in wooden crates as they did a fantastic job of mitigating dust and moisture as designed. Domestic market bikes (EU/UK) delivered via lorry stillage saw the covers given to owners in their plastic bag which also had the 2 keys w/tag and owners manuals/booklets inside.
- Toolkit - Under the rear tail is stored a standard Ducati toolkit in the usual red bag.
- The "Accessories" box as it was referred to, was shipped with every 996R. In the case of the street legal serialised bikes it included: Carbon 50mm Termignoni slip-ons w/ECU, larger exhaust clamps, an Öhlins spanner for adjusting the rear shock, the windscreen, the side mirrors, and a sealed FIAMM battery.
  Of course the non-serialised non-road use 996Rs did not receive the windscreen or the side mirrors.

== Marketing ==
75 Anniversary marketing:

Ducati began celebrating their 75th anniversary via marketing material in the summer of 2001. Most collateral for the 2001 model year was printed in August 2000, so it was the marketing collateral for the 2002 model year that was printed in August 2001 which saw the 75 anniversary logo on the back of their catalogues, on their posters, etc. In certain markets they released special 75th anniversary posters and other materials to celebrate. For example, Germany received a fold-out poster of the 996R with the 75th anniversary logo.

Duke Video:

A film crew from Duke Marketing were present at the Valencia press launch. They created a special 10 minute DVD feature of the event titled "The Ultimate Superbike - Ducati 996R".

Superbike World Championship Review, 2001 DVD - Released by Duke after the 2001 WSBK season and covers all of the race highlights plus additional specials and interviews.

== Online ordering ==
The 996R was only the second ever Ducati offered for sale via the internet. The first had been the 2000 MH900 Evolution.

Starting on the morning of September 12, 2000 at 9AM, Ducati began taking online deposits of €2000 Euros and allowing the buyer to nominate a dealers for completing the transaction. All available pre-order allocations sold out within the day, some say in just hours.

The total number of allocations Ducati allowed for online ordering was between 373 and 375 units. The remaining 325 units were made available via dealers starting January 1, 2001.

Total (2001) price was: GBP £17.000 | EUR €26.000

Inflation adjusted prices (2023): GBP £30.375 | EUR €41.647

== Production Numbers ==
Ian Falloon's book Standard Catalogue Of Ducati Motorcycles 1946-2005 shows the following for 996R production numbers, which has been verified by Ducati in writing as recently as 2021. It should be noted these batches were not built in this order:

996 R 2001 Testastretta Red Internet - 191 (included in this batch were 56 UK bikes assembled on 29 Jan 2001)

996 R 2001 Testastretta Red - 120

996 R USA 2001 Testastretta Red - 60 (all non-serialised bikes)

996 R AUS 2001 Testastretta Red - 40

996 R JPN 2001 Testastretta Red Internet - 113

996 R JPN 2001 Testastretta Red - 50

996 R 2001 Testastretta Red Internet - 56

996 R 2001 Testastretta Red - 30

996 R France 2001 Testastretta Red Internet - 13

996 R France 2001 Testastretta Red - 25

Total: 698 worldwide

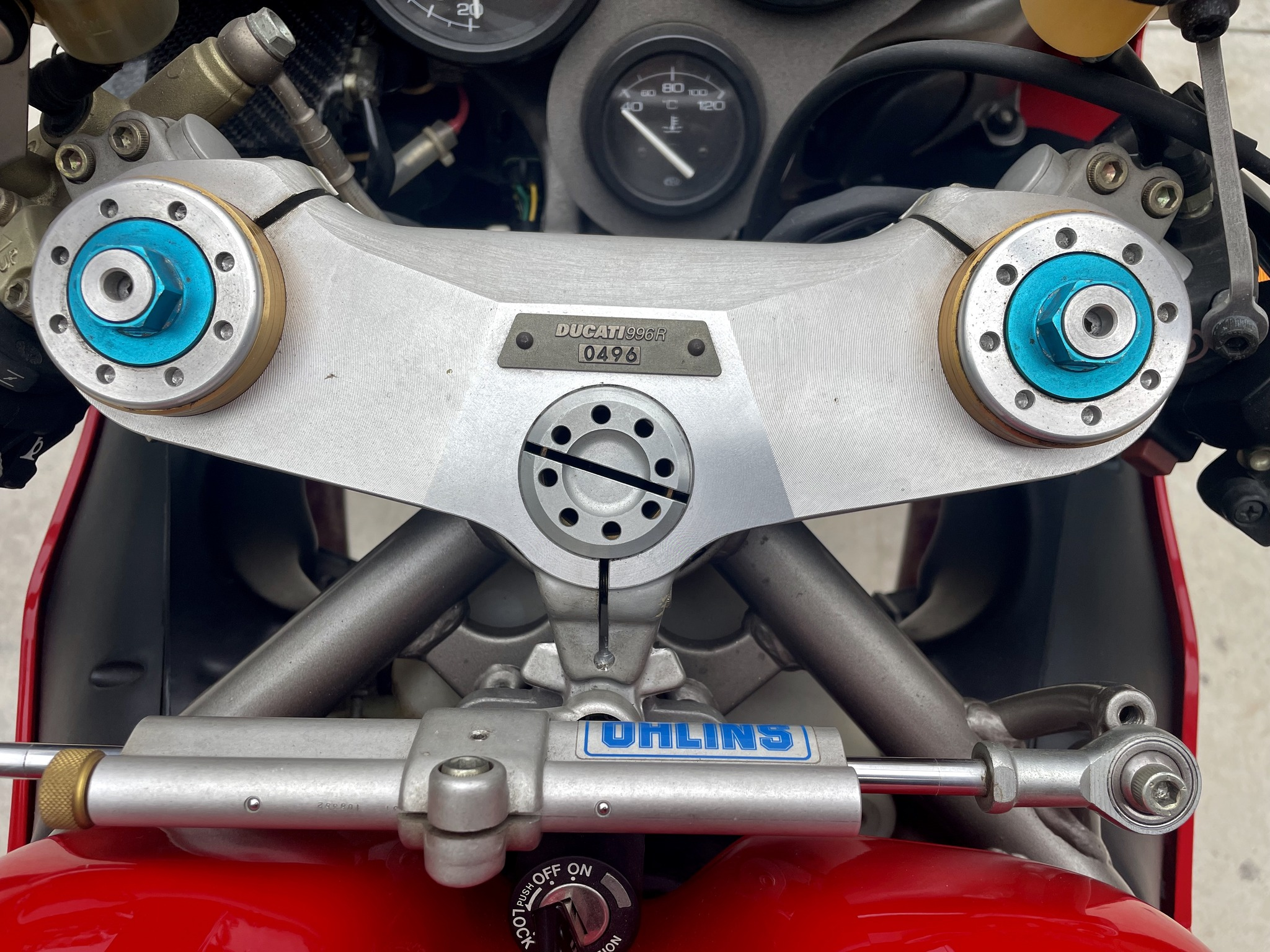
The plaque of 996R #0496 as proof there were at a minimum, 500 serialised bikes produced.

The breakdown above shows 698 units world-wide, 373 of which were internet sales. This falls only 2 bikes short of Ducati's March 2021 official statement which stated 375 internet bikes. It's also important to understand that this production total is worldwide because most of Ducati's limited edition models prior were serialised based on market.

USA Production: It's *believed* that the 60 units shipped to the US to be sold for "non-road use" were all non-serialised. The US sold bikes had proper MPH only speedometers and a Fahrenheit temperature gauge. The UK bikes for example had MPH speedometers which also had KPH indicated on them in red. Most other countries received proper KPH only speedometers. Very notable on US market bikes were many extra warning stickers (windscreen, mirrors, exhaust, etc.), decals (fuel tank, helmet holder, etc.), and emissions label specific to the US stating "operation on public streets, roads and highways is illegal". They also lacked the several usual DOT reflectors compared to road compliant US bikes.

== Production and delivery Dates ==
"Late 2000" is the earliest documented date we know of that production bikes were fully assembled at the factory. Most take this to mean November and certainly December. Prior to this it had only been prototypes (for marketing collateral and shows) and assembly validation bikes. At some point several bikes were built to be their motorcycle journalist test fleet (used in March 2001), most of which were denoted by the serial 000N on the triple clamp. It's known that 2 of these blew their engines during the press event at Valencia.

Customer deliveries did not begin until June and went on throughout the summer into Autumn. September is thought to be the last month any production took place based on authenticity plaques.

It's been mentioned by some that there was an issue with the brand new generation Testastretta engine, which had become evident at the press event. It's believed that the half a year delay in the first serialised customer deliveries from when the production started was to account for updates Ducati incorporated into the bikes prior to them leaving the factory. A few original owners on forums over the years have mentioned that many were held by dealers prior to customer delivery for the updates to be done, but no proof of that has been found. It appears the bikes were held back at the factory.

== Serialised vs. non-serialised ==
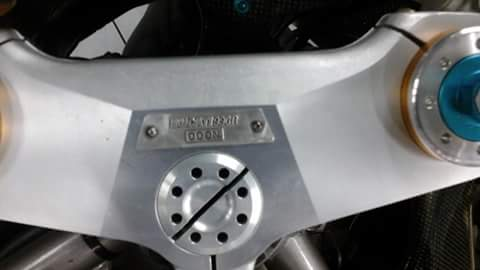
Serial plaque from a press fleet 996R

A long-standing rumour holds that non-serialised bikes were all "held back" for race teams. But that's not true. Actual race teams would have bought the 996RS (14 were made but had Desmoquattro engines) straight from Ducati, rather purchase a street bike, with a need to strip it all down, and then have to pay independently for all of the racing parts. The Ducati factory team's riders, on the other hand, were issued what were known as F01 bikes, F for factory and 01 for the year. These were very special bikes that were at least a year ahead in development compared to the RS bikes Ducati sold to the public. However, most of the non-serialised bikes were expected to be purchased by small privateer teams and individual racers, who didn't have the budget for an RS. It's also known that there were several race teams who did buy non-serialised 996Rs, and who did have to expend the extra time and expense to strip them down, and then build them up to RS spec, just to possess the next generation Testastretta engine.

The non-serialised 996R, just like the 998R after and the SPS bikes prior, were sold to USA customers for "non-road use" only. The dealers had the buyers sign a piece of paper which acknowledged this, but of course many ignored it and could get them registered depending on their state laws. The NHTSA was catching onto this and that's why the 996R and later 998R bikes that made their way to the USA lacked many parts which were required for them to be street legal:

Tail-lights (had red tape covering holes)

Number plate holder

Rear turn signals

Front turn signals

Kick stand

Headlights (had hard plastic insert to fill holes)

Choke switch on left clip-on

Mirrors

They came with the street exhaust installed and the carbon slip-ons in a box just like the serialised street versions. They also shipped with a display stand like the street versions. Notably the non-serialised version had the same wiring harness so many opted to purchase all of the missing items from their Ducati dealership to make the bike more street legal in appearance.

*Add recall section

== Racing success ==
After disappointing tests at Mugello in Sept 2000, Carl Fogarty finally announced his retirement, leaving the door open to Troy Bayliss to succeed him.

Ducati Corse supported two teams in World Superbike. In the team Ducati Infostrada, Ruben Xaus joined Bayliss, while Ben Bostrom resumed full works status, but in a separate L&M sponsored team, on Dunlop tyres. Both teams were run under the instruction of Davide Tardozzi, and they were the only teams with the Testastretta engine for 2001. 174HP@12,200RPM with 60mm throttle bodies. It's also notable that these were the very first bikes to have radial mount front brake calipers as opposed to axial mount.

WSBK - 2001 Superbike World Championship - These in 2001 were run on 998F01 bikes running the new Testastretta engine:

Troy Bayliss - 1st

Ben Bostrom - 3rd

Neil Hodgson - 5th (Not being a factory rider, he was on the old Desmoquattro 996RS)

Ruben Xaus - 6th

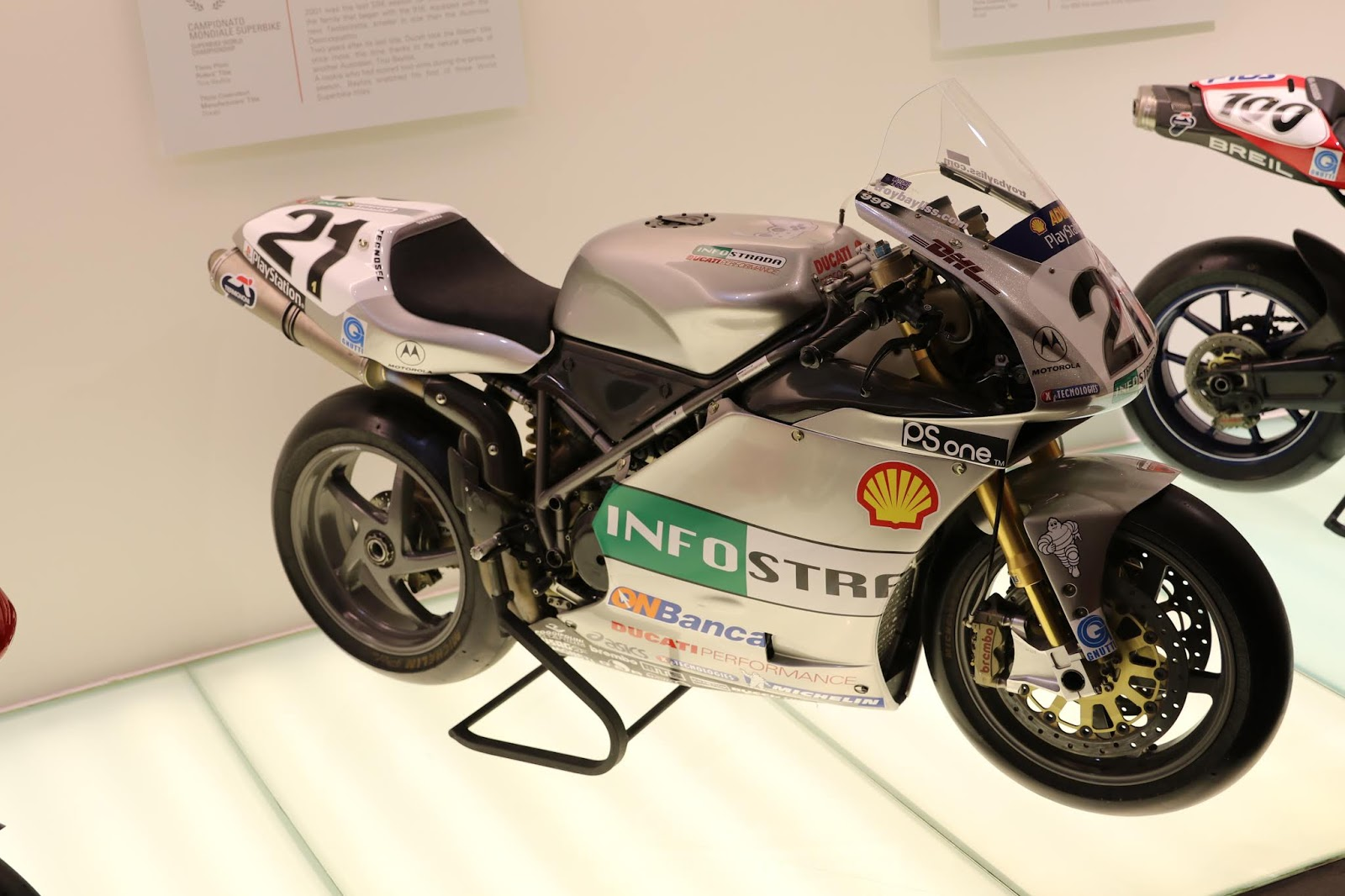
Bayliss's winning F01 at the Ducati Museum, still wearing it's commemorative livery.

Bayliss was immediately happy with the 998F01, and with six wins, he took the Riders' Championship. After a slow start, Bostrom won 5 races in succession and Ducati gained its 10th manufactures title with 15 wins. Hodgson proved surprisingly competitive against the new generation factory machines in the World Superbike Championship.

After being crowned the champion at the next to final race in Assen, Ducati painted his F01 bike silver for the upcoming final race in honour of Paul Smart.

BSB - 2001 British Superbike Championship - These in 2001 were run on 996RS bikes running the old Desmoquattro engine.

In Britain, John Reynolds, Sean Emmett, and Steve Hislop were unbeatable. 168HP@12,000 for the 996RS with the final iteration of the Desmoquattro.

John Reynolds - 1st

Steve Hislop - 2nd

Sean Emmett - 3rd

Paul Brown - 5th

Isle of Man TT - Cancelled in 2001 due to Foot & Mouth disease

It's know that 2 non-serialised bikes produced at the end of 2000 were sent off to be prepared for Rutter, however they were sold off due to the cancellation of the race.

Michael Rutter - Scheduled to run and was favoured to win at the time.
