= Ducati 996 =

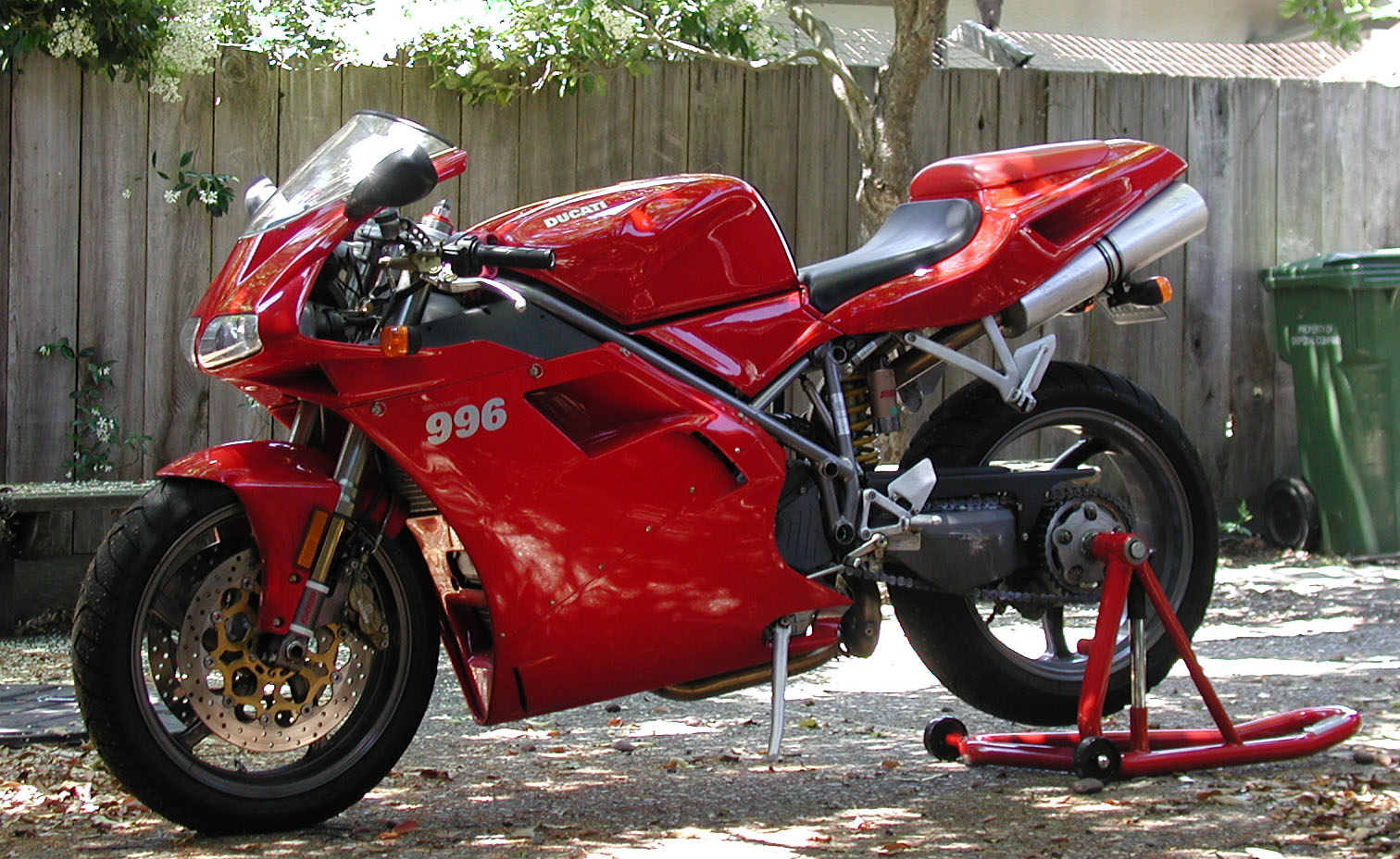
- Manufacturer: Ducati
- Production: 1999–2002
- Predecessor: Ducati 916
- Successor: Ducati 998
- Class: Sport bike
- Engine: 996 cc (61 cu in), 90° L-twin, fuel injected 4 valve per cylinder desmodromic, liquid cooled
- Bore / stroke: 98.0 mm × 66.0 mm (3.86 in × 2.60 in)
- Compression ratio: 11.5:1
- Top speed: 259 km/h (161 mph)
- Power: 112 hp (82.3 kW) @ 8500 rpm
- Torque: 93 Nm (9.5 kg-m) @ 8000 rpm
- Transmission: 6 speed, chain drive
- Frame type: Tubular steel trellis frame
- Suspension: Front: Showa with TiN upside-down fork fully adjustable, 127 mm (5.0 in)wheel travel Rear: Öhlins progressive cantilever linkage with adjustable monoshock, 130 mm (5.1 in) wheel travel
- Brakes: Front: 2 x 320 mm discs, 4 piston calipers Rear: Single 220 mm disc, 2 piston caliper
- Tires: Front: 120/70 ZR17; Rear: 190/50 ZR17
- Wheelbase: 1,410 mm (55.5 in)
- Dimensions: L: 2,010 mm (79.1 in); W: 690 mm (27.2 in); H: 1,090 mm (42.9 in)
- Seat height: 790 mm (31.1 in)
- Weight: 198 kg (437 lb) (dry)
- Fuel capacity: 17 litres (4.5 US gal) (4 litres (1.1 US gal) reserve)

The Ducati 996 is a Ducati sport bike motorcycle made from 1999 to 2002, based upon the earlier 916.

== Model history ==
From 1999, there were three different models of the 996: a base, or Biposto; the 996S with Öhlins suspension; the 996SPS (Europe only) which had a more powerful engine and less weight thanks to some titanium and carbon fibre parts. From 2001 the 996R replaced the 996SPS and featured the new 998 cc (60.9 cu in) Testastretta engine. There was also the 748, which offered less horsepower.

The 996 had larger 98 mm (3.9 in) pistons, larger valves, a stronger crankshaft and crankcases ported from the 916 SPS. But since the 916 camshaft gave a softer, less peaky power delivery and less top-end power (83.5 kW (112.0 hp) versus the SPS's 92.4 kW (123.9 hp)) the 996 was built with a new air intake system with two fuel injectors per cylinder. A new airbox and a distinctive underseat exhaust system were also built into the new design. The chassis was also modified. Lighter wheels were introduced along with improved calipers, discs and pads stronger compared to the 916. The suspension system was still the same Showa design but both the front and back were fully adjustable for damping and preload.

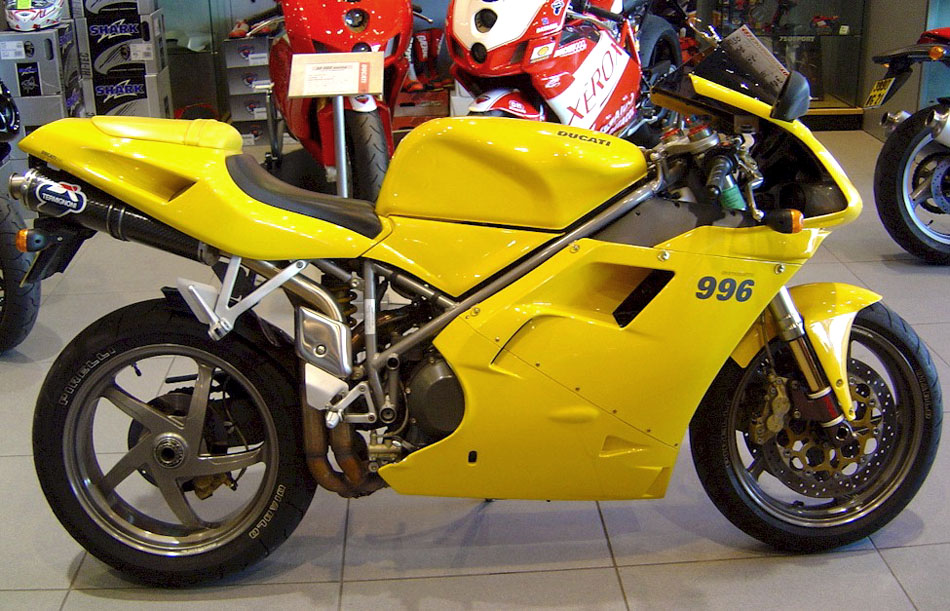
2000 996 Biposto

Updates in 2000 saw the wheels change and get updated to all new Marchesini wheels. The front forks were also titanium nitrided to reduce stiction. The spokes also changed from the three-spoke rim style of the 916 to a new five-spoke scheme. In 2001 another overhaul saw the 996 rear shock absorber change from a Showa to an Öhlins.

In 2002, the 996 was superseded by the Ducati 998.

=== 996 SPS ===
The 996SPS suffix stood for ‘Sport Production Special’. The engine was the same as the one used in the 916SPS but the weight was cut down considerably. The 996SPS produced around 92.4 kW (124 bhp), more than the standard 996. The 996's special SPS engine was much stronger than anything that Ducati or any other manufacturer at the time had produced for the track. To ensure a distance was held between the standard 996 and the 996SPS Ducati designed a much higher specification chassis for the SPS. The wheels were a five spoke design but were lighter than the standard three spoke design of the 916 and the early 996. In 1999 the rear shocks were made by high quality Swedish suspensions manufacturer, Öhlins with Showa front forks. In 2000 Öhlins forks were added. The adjustable steering head also allowed geometry changes to the steel tube trellis frame making it suitable for different riding styles or race tracks.

=== 996 R ===
In 2001 Ducati introduced the limited production (only 500 were built), 996 R, the suffix standing for ‘Racing’, which featured Öhlins suspension (rear and front), carbon fiber bodywork, a revised and more streamlined fairing, but most importantly the newly redesigned engine, the Testastretta (narrow-head) which actually displaced 998cc. The engine got its name from the narrower angle between the intake and exhaust valves, down to only 25 degrees, which was designed by Ing. Marchetti, coming from Ferrari F1. It featured more aggressive camshafts, titanium conrods and a shorter stroke and wider bore, which allowed it to rev more safely at high RPMs. It produced 98.5 kW (136 bhp) at 10,200 RPM with a maximum torque of 105 Nm at 8000 RPM. Most of the chassis was the same as the 996 SPS, but using a new Brembo braking system, with thinner discs and 4-pad, 4-pot calipers with 34mm pistons.

A Ducati 996 was featured in The Matrix Reloaded.

=== Final updates ===
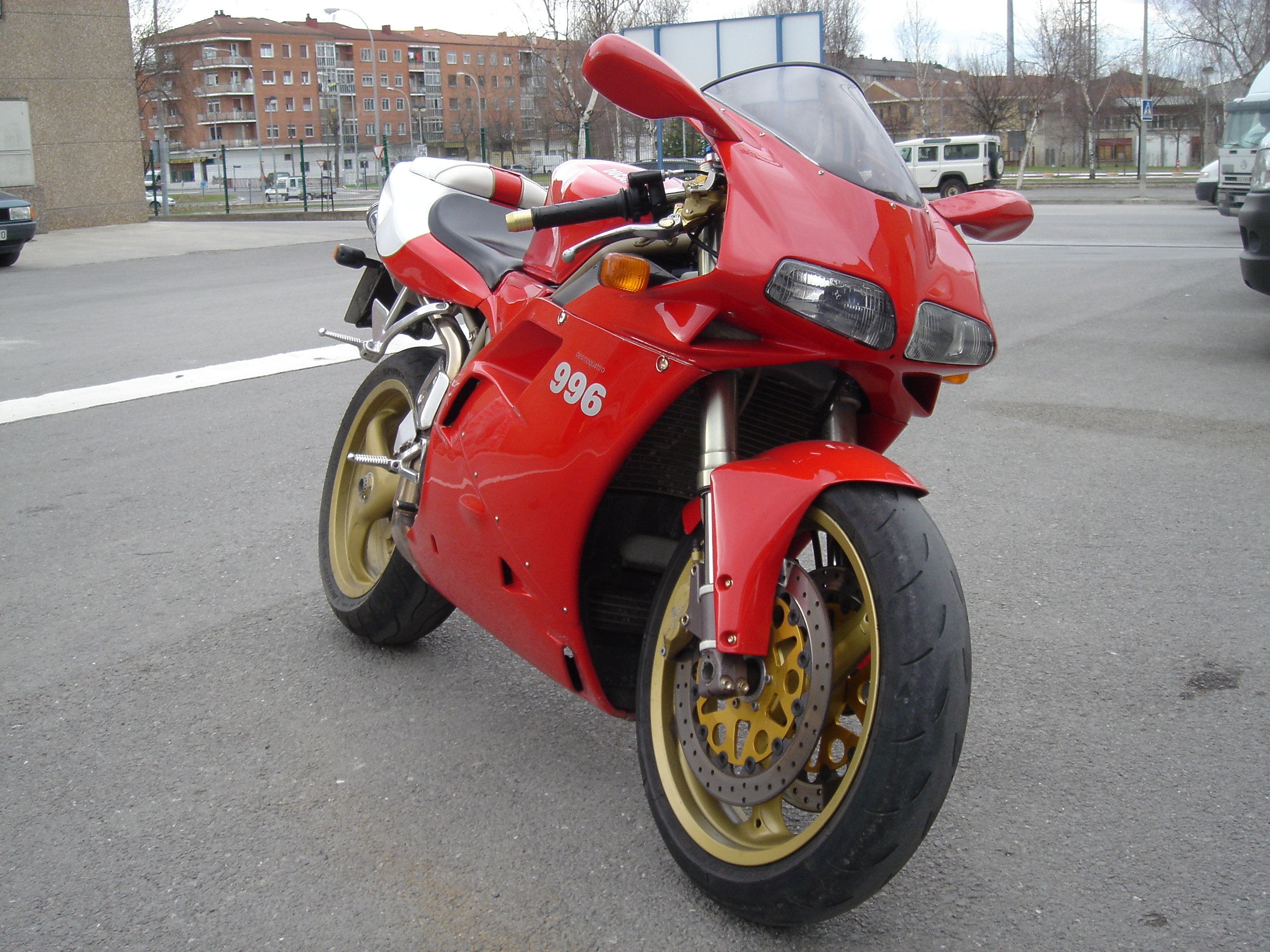
Ducati 996 Biposto

Ducati updated the bike with Öhlins front forks, which featured a titanium nitride coating on the stanchions to minimise friction. An aluminum rear subframe and other detail modifications reduced the bike's weight even further.
