= Ducati 748 =

Sport bike

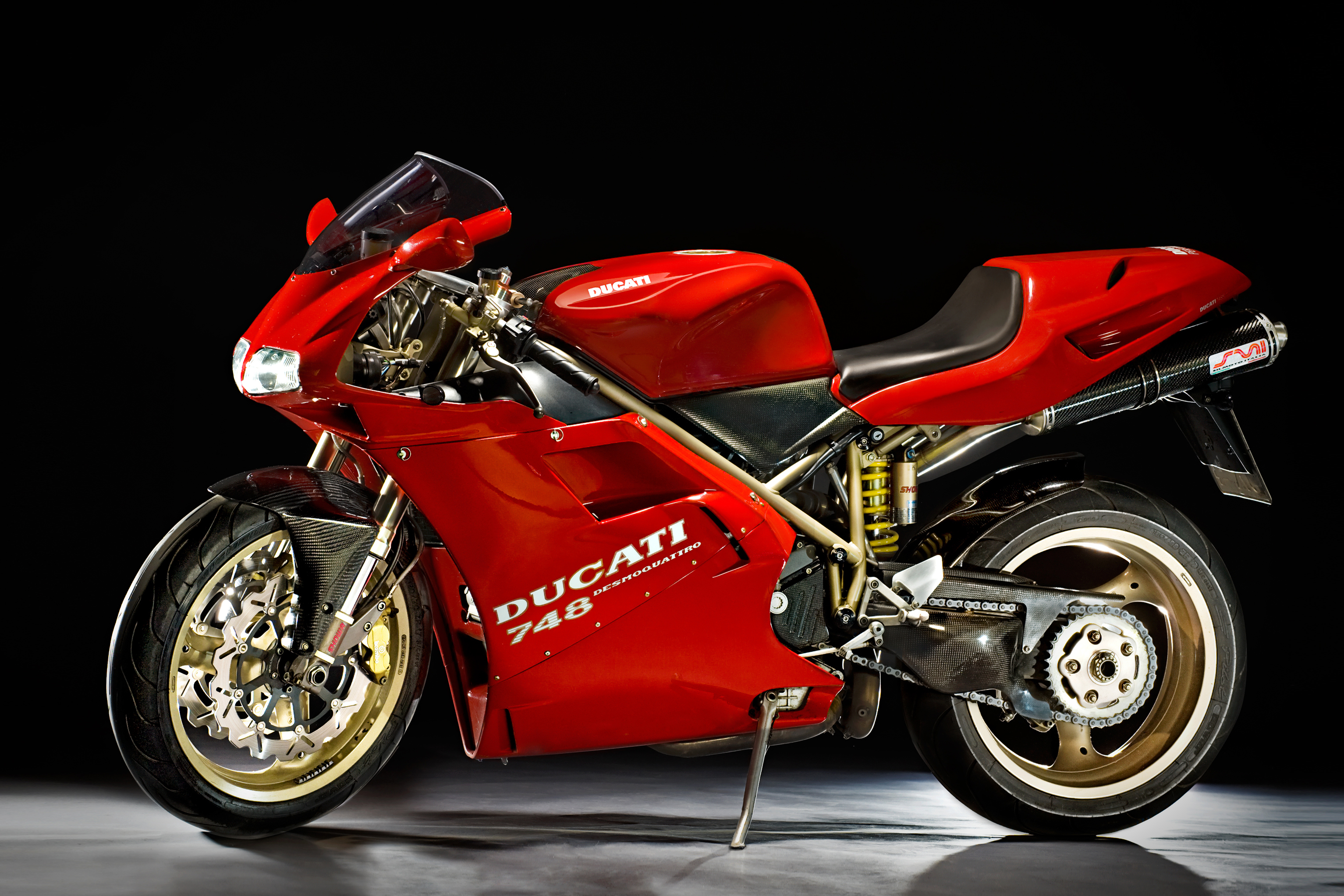
- Manufacturer: Ducati
- Production: 1994–2003
- Successor: Ducati 749
- Class: Sport bike
- Engine: 748 cc (45.6 cu in) desmodromic liquid cooled 90° V-twin
- Bore / stroke: 88 mm × 61.5 mm (3.46 in × 2.42 in)
- Compression ratio: 11.5:1; 11.6:1 (SP, SPS)
- Top speed: 240 km/h (150 mph) (Economy, Biposto); 250 km/h (155 mph) (SP, SPS); 255 km/h (158 mph) (R)
- Power: 87 hp (65 kW) @ 10,400 rpm 73 kW (98 hp) @ 11,000 rpm (Strada, Biposto, Economy 1995–1999); 72 kW (97 hp) @ 11,000 rpm (748 2000–2007); 78 kW (104 hp) @ 11,000 rpm (SP, SPS); 79 kW (106 hp) @ 11,000 rpm (R)
- Transmission: Dry multiplate clutch, 6 speed, chain drive
- Suspension: Front: 43 mm telescopic fork, all Showa exc. R, Ohlins; Rear: Swingarm, rising rate shock, all Showa exc. R, Ohlins, and Economy, Sachs-Boge
- Brakes: Front: 2 × 320 mm disc Rear: 220 mm disc
- Rake, trail: 24.5°
- Wheelbase: 1,410 mm (56 in)
- Dimensions: L: 2,050 mm (81 in) (1995–1996); 2,030 mm (80 in) (1997–2002); W: 685 mm (27.0 in) (1995–1996); 780 mm (31 in) (1997–2002); H: 1,090 mm (43 in) (1995–1996); 1,080 mm (43 in) (1997–2002)
- Seat height: 790 mm (31 in)
- Weight: 200 kg (440 lb) (Strada); 202 kg (445 lb) (Biposto); 198 kg (437 lb) (SP); 194 kg (428 lb) (SPS); 196 kg (432 lb) (Economy); 192 kg (423 lb) (R) (dry); 203 kg (448 lb) (unfueled) (wet)
- Related: Ducati 916

The Ducati 748 is a Ducati sport bike, produced from 1994 to 2002. The 748 was the smaller displacement version of the 916, and was succeeded in 2003 by the 749.

== Design ==
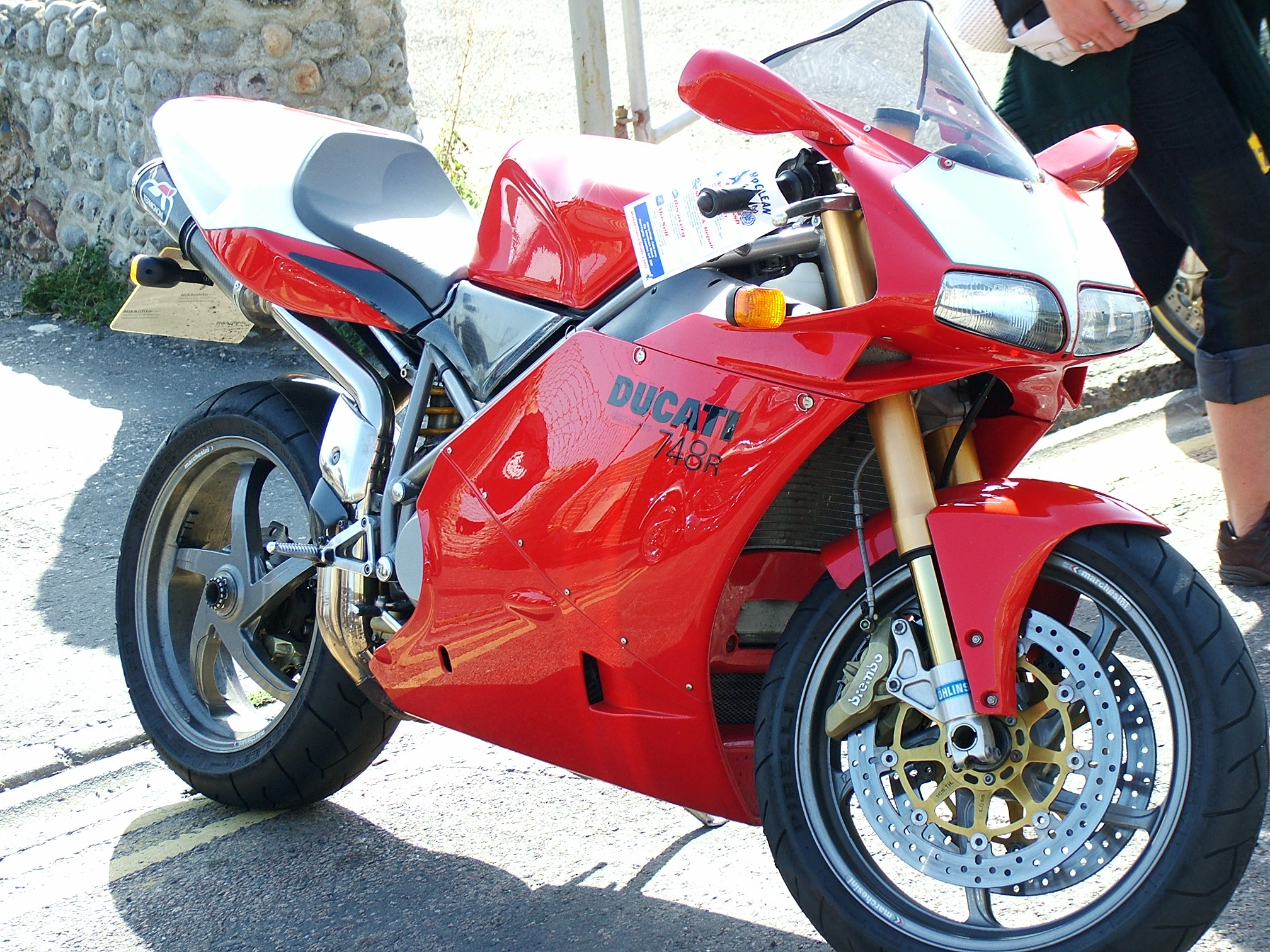
Ducati 748R

The Ducati Desmoquattro engine began as 748 cc (45.6 cu in) displacement engine, with cylinder heads that were originally meant for a smaller bore than the 916, so the introduction of a smaller version of the 916 was to be expected.

The Ducati 748 is identical in almost every way to the 916, both creations of Ducati in-house designer Massimo Tamburini, and both sharing some design elements with the Ducati Supermono. The only differences are rear tyre size (180/55/17 as opposed to the 916's 190/50/17) and engine capacity (88 mm bore and 61.5 mm stroke) of 748 cc (45.6 cu in). The engine's shorter piston stroke gives a higher rev ceiling of 11500 RPM, and the smaller pistons help the engine accelerate more quickly.

== Variations ==
Ducati produced several variations of the 748, starting with the basic 748 Biposto (meaning "two seat") in 1994 and then the 1995–96 748SP and 1996–99 748SPS followed as more powerful options. The different variations of the engine (weighing close to 54 kilograms (119 lb) each, produced at least 71 kilowatts (95 hp). The SP and SPS engines were in a higher state of tune and also came only as monoposto (meaning "single seat"), although it was possible to order the base 748 with a monoposto option, and were intended as homologation machines for World Supersport racing. Other extras over the base model included Ohlins rear shock and fully floating cast-iron Brembo brake disks. The engines also came with an oil cooler.

In 2000, Ducati revamped their 748 model line to include a third variation. The base model was now known as the 748E, available as Biposto or Monoposto, with 3-spoke gold wheels and gold frame. Gone were the quick-release Dzus fasteners on the fairing, replaced with plain fairing fasteners, and the frame also had a fixed steering head angle. The rear shock was a Sachs-Boge unit with Showa forks. This helped to keep costs down.

The intermediate model was known as the 748S. This had lighter 5-spoke Marchesini wheels in grey to match the grey frame, also retaining the earlier adjustable steering head. The rear shock was now a Showa unit with Showa forks at the front, making use of Titanium-Nitride (TiN) coating on the fork stanchions to "reduce stiction", which also gave it a gold coloring. The engine was the same as the 748 SP/SPS.

The top of the range model was now the 748R, Ducati's racing homologation model produced only in very limited numbers. This engine was again a derivative of the SPS model but with more tuning. The main difference is that the R model has an overhead shower-injector arrangement compared to the 748E and S model's traditional throttle bodies, titanium connecting rods, titanium valves and more extreme valve timing.

As such, the 748R has a larger, two-part airbox and thus the frame was also different in order to accommodate this. The suspension choice was Ohlins for both the rear shock and front forks, although the very first models in 2000 used Showa titanium nitride (TiN) front forks and a Showa shock absorber. The engine included a very basic slipper clutch to ensure that this would then be homologated for use in racing, as well as an oil cooler.

Ducati also produced a very limited run (fewer than 20) of 748RS machines, which were intended as full racing machines and as such came with no road-going equipment (lights, odometer, mirrors). The engine internals and components were vastly different from any road-based Ducati, using a variety of light-weight, high-strength materials making them extremely expensive to purchase, run and maintain. The RS came with a 54 mm exhaust system and a slightly smaller size and gauge of Chromoly tubing was used on the frame to reduce weight even further.

In 2002, Ducati also produced the limited edition 748S Titanium Grey (commonly, but not officially, known as Senna), which used the same components as the 748S but had flat grey body work, grey frame, and red Marchesini 5 spoke wheels. It came in both Monoposto and Biposto versions.

== End of production and successor ==
Production of the Ducati 748 ended in 2002. It was available for purchase alongside its successor, the 749, until dealer stocks were exhausted.
