= Ducati 998 =

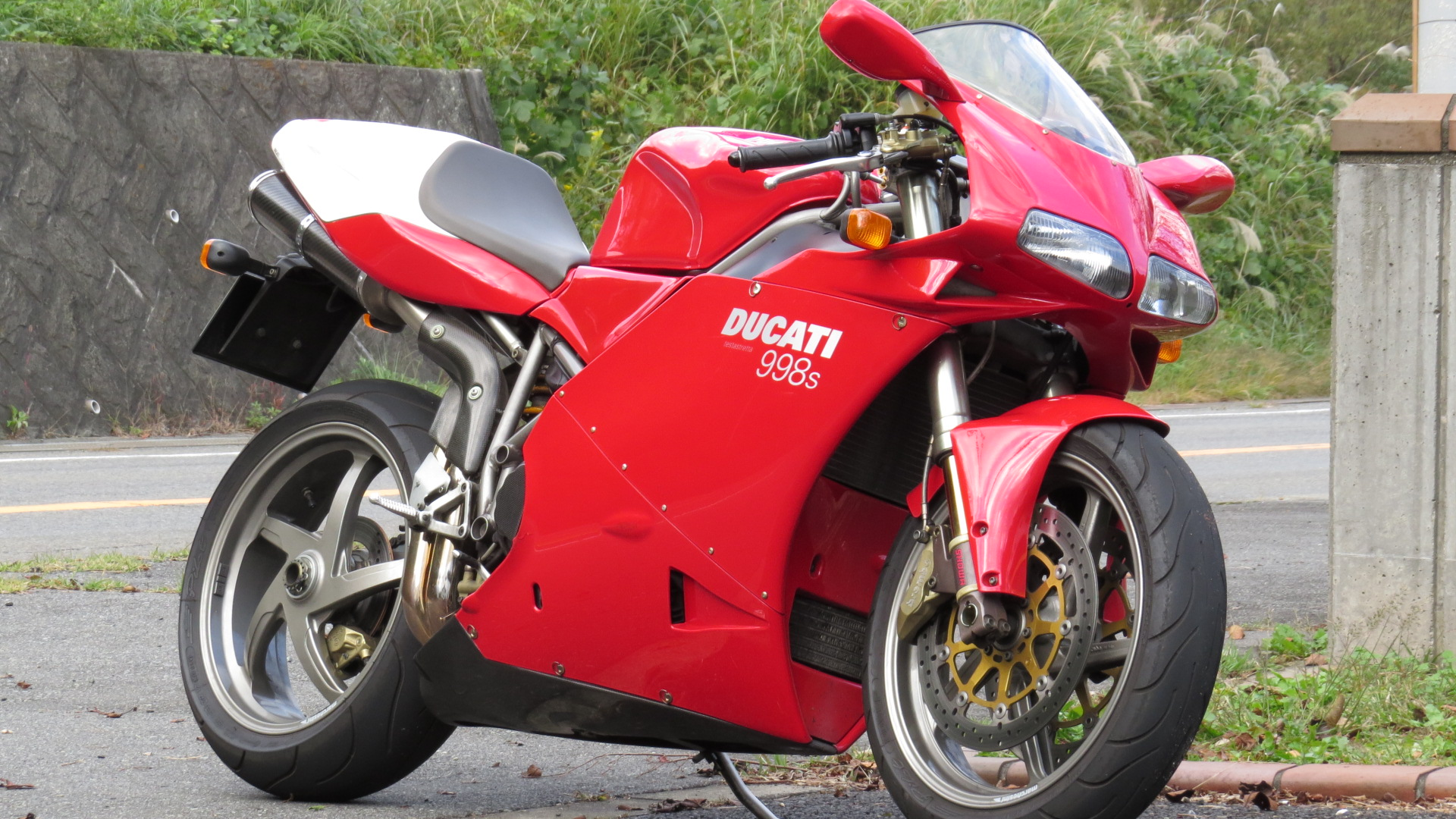
- Manufacturer: Ducati
- Production: 2002–2004
- Predecessor: Ducati 996
- Successor: Ducati 999
- Class: Sport bike
- Engine: 998 cc (61 cu in), L-twin, fuel injected 4 valve per cylinder desmodromic, liquid cooled
- Bore / stroke: 100.0 mm × 63.5 mm (3.94 in × 2.50 in)
- Power: 123 hp (92 kW) @ 9,750 rpm
- Transmission: 6-speed, chain drive
- Frame type: Tubular steel trellis frame
- Suspension: Front: Showa 43 mm Rear: Fully adjustable Ohlins
- Brakes: Front: 2 x 320 mm disc, 4-piston Brembo caliper Rear: Single 220 mm disc, two-piston caliper
- Wheelbase: 55.5 in (1,409.7 mm)
- Seat height: 790 mm (31 in)

The Ducati 998 is a sport bike made by Ducati from 2002 to 2004. It was the successor to the Ducati 996 and the final variation on the Ducati 916. The new Testastretta engine shared many similarities with the previous Desmoquattro engine in the 996, although it was completely new from the crankshaft up. Testastretta means narrow head and refers to a complete redesign of the cylinder heads. The desmodromic valve actuation method was retained.

The 996 had a bore and stroke of 98.0 mm × 66.0 mm (3.86 in × 2.60 in). The bore and stroke of the 998 was more oversquare at 100.0 mm × 63.5 mm (3.94 in × 2.50 in). The included valve angle was reduced from 40 degrees on the 996 to 25 degrees on the 998. Valve sizes were increased, and the camshafts had slightly increased lift, but with shorter duration. Horsepower increased from 112 to 123.

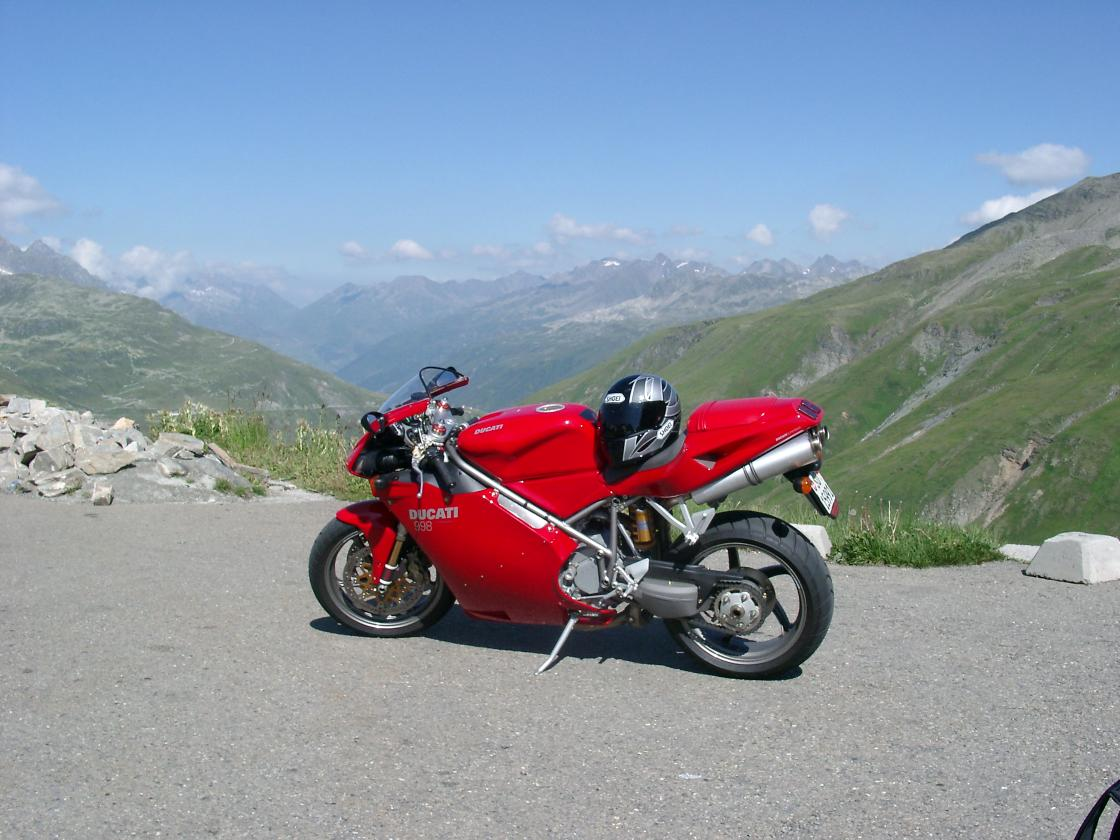
Ducati 998

The 998R and non US 998S models had different crankcases with a deep oil sump. The standard 998 had crankcases which were very similar to the previous Desmoquattro. The non US 998S as well as the 998R had revised cam profiles which provided more power than the standard 998. The 998R model used a 104.0 mm × 58.8 mm (4.09 in × 2.31 in) mm bore and stroke which actually displaced 999 cc, and was very similar to the engine used in the subsequent 999R model.

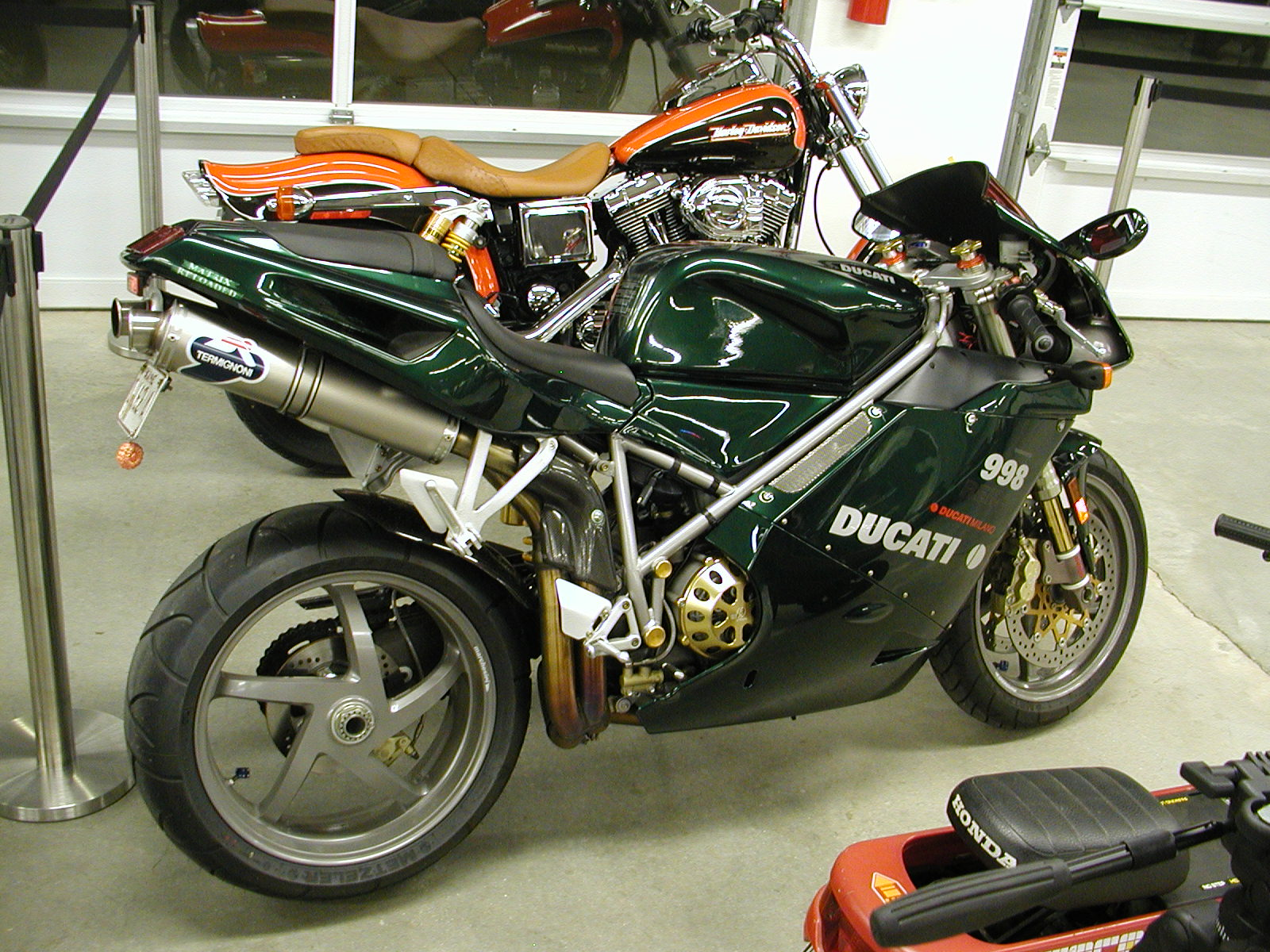
Ducati 998 Matrix

In 2001, Ducati introduced the 996R (see Ducati 996) with the 998 cc Testastretta engine. This bike was the true introduction of the Testastretta engine and the 998 model. The engine was similar to the 2002 non US 998S. Only 500 were sold which was all that were needed to homologate the bike to race in the World Superbike Championship. This bike won the World Superbike Championship in 2001 with rider Troy Bayliss. Michael Rutter won the Macau Grand Prix in 2002 and 2003.

A 2001 Ducati 996, in dark green, was featured in the 2003 movie The Matrix Reloaded. Ducati subsequently announced a limited edition of similar bikes for model year 2004 in a very dark green color, but as production of the 996 had since ceased, these were actually 998-series bikes.

The 998 officially ended production in 2004 with the release of the 998s FE ("Final Edition"). This bike was only available by special order, it was not available as a regular production model. They were available in Biposto and Monoposto (one or two seat) versions. It was largely similar to the US model 2002 998S (using the standard 998 engine but with uprated Ohlins suspension components and Brembo four-piston calipers).

== Ducati 998 models ==
998 Strada (Biposto and Monoposto): 2002–2003

998S Ben Bostrom and Troy Bayliss replicas (USA Version): 2002

998S non US model: 2002

998R: 2002

998 Matrix: 2004

998 FE (Final Edition): 2004

=== 998S FE (Final Edition): 2004 ===
The final edition of the 916 family was produced in limited numbers and released in 2004. There were 981 of these bikes made but they were not individually numbered, but did have some identifying features. In total 419 biposto and 562 monoposto bikes were made. See breakdown below. The engine made 136bhp and was the newer Testastretta unit previously used in the R bikes and included Ohlins front and rear. Other features for this limited-edition model are You get a Limited Edition plaque on the headstock, tank graphics, tri-colore tailpiece graphics and upgraded Ohlins front suspension.

Production numbers for all Ducati 998 variants

998 R 2002 Testastretta Red Internet	5
998 Testastretta Biposto Red 2002	559
998 Testastretta Biposto Yellow 2002	90
998 Testastretta Monoposto Red 2002	57
998 Testastretta Monoposto Yellow 2002	11
998 Testastretta Biposto Cal Red 2002	233
998 Testastretta Biposto Cal Yellow 2002	17
998 Testastretta Monoposto Cal Red 2002	100
998 Testastretta Monoposto Cal Yellow 2002	75
998 Testastretta S 2002 Red	163
998 Testastretta S 2002 Yellow	1
998 Testastretta S Monoposto 2002 Red	44
998 Testastretta S Monoposto 2002 Red	17
998 Testastretta S Aus Monoposto 2002 Red	18
998 Testastretta S Aus Monoposto 2002 Yellow	5
998 Testastretta S Monoposto Aus 2002 Red	7
998 Testastretta S Monoposto JPN 2002 Red	51
998 Testastretta S Monoposto JPN 2002 Red	29
998 Testastretta S ENG 2002 Red	46
998 Testastretta S Monoposto ENG 2002 Red	10
998 Testastretta S France 2002 Red	35
998 Testastretta S Monoposto France 2002 Red	2
998 Testastetta Biposto Aus Red 2002	40
998 Testastretta Biposto Aus Yellow 2002	5
998 Testastretta Monoposto JPN Red 2002	45
998 Testastretta Monoposto JPN Yellow 2002	10
998 Testastretta Biposto ENG Red 2002	100
998 Testastretta Biposto ENG Yellow 2002	10
998 Testastretta Biposto France Red 2002	88
998 Strada 2000	11
998 Testastretta Bostrom Cal 2002	155
998 Testastretta Bostrom 2002	1
Total	2040
