= Ducati 916 =

Sport bike

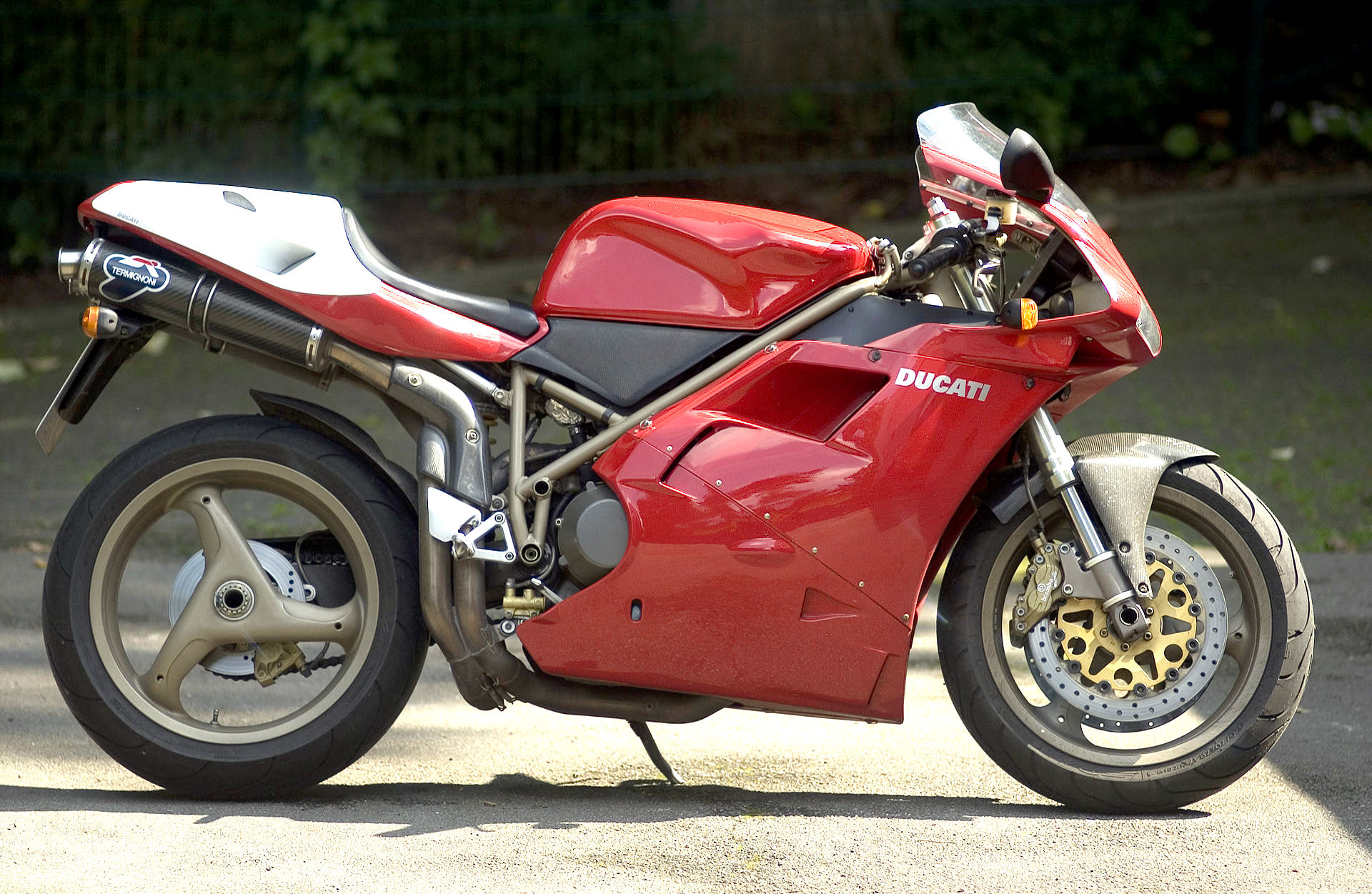
- 1998 Ducati 916 SPS
- Manufacturer: Ducati
- Production: 1994–1998
- Predecessor: Ducati 888
- Successor: Ducati 996
- Class: Sport bike
- Engine: Four-stroke, 916 cc (56 cu in), 90° V-twin, fuel injected 4-valve-per-cylinder desmodromic, liquid-cooled
- Bore / stroke: 94.0 mm × 66.0 mm (3.70 in × 2.60 in)
- Top speed: 257 km/h (159.7 mph) or 260 km/h (161.6 mph)
- Power: 85 kW (114 bhp) @ 9000 rpm (claimed)
- Torque: 67 lb⋅ft (91 N⋅m) @ 6,900 rpm (claimed)
- Transmission: 6-speed, chain drive
- Frame type: Tubular steel trellis frame
- Suspension: Front: 43 mm (1.7 in) Showa; Rear: Showa rising-rate mono swingarm (US and Senna had Öhlins)
- Brakes: Front: Dual 320 mm (13 in) disc Rear: Single 220 mm (8.7 in) disc
- Wheelbase: 1,410 mm (56 in)
- Dimensions: L: 2,050 mm (81 in); W: 685 mm (27.0 in)
- Seat height: 790 mm (31 in)
- Weight: 194.5 kg (429 lb) (dry)

The Ducati 916 is a fully faired sport bike made by Ducati from 1994 to 1998. (Note: Only 4 1994-model year 916 Monopostos were produced in 1993. Production was in full in 1994, with 3,196 916s of all types produced, followed by 3,875 in 1995, only 2,896 in 1996, then 5,281 in 1997 and finally 2,755 in 1998, by which time production of the 996 had begun, for a total 916 run of 18,006.) Featuring a 916 cc (56 cu in) fuel injected, 4-valve, desmo, liquid-cooled, 90° V-twin engine in a trellis frame with a single-sided swingarm and USD forks, the 916 is frequently cited as one of the most beautiful motorcycles ever.

== Design and development ==
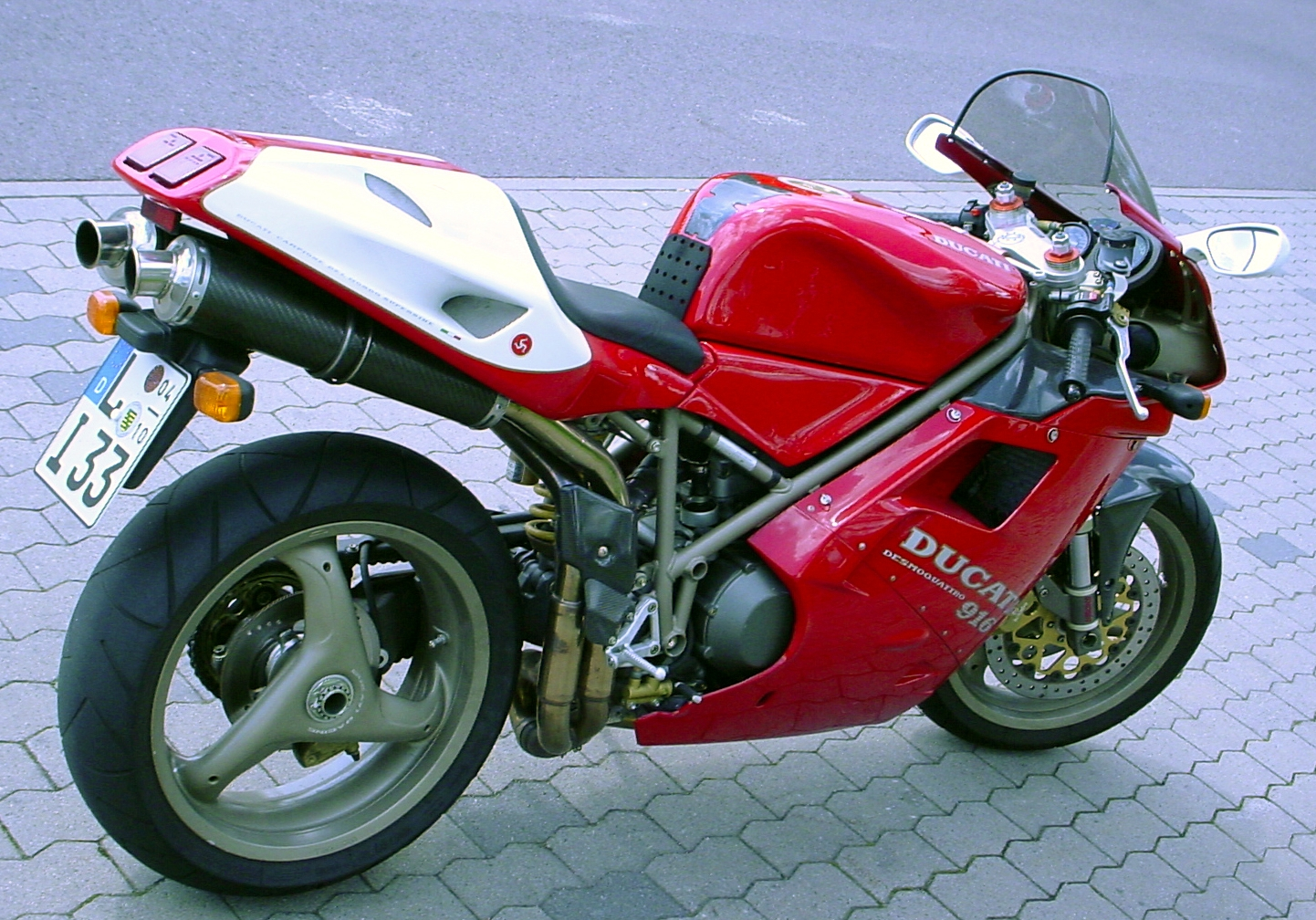
Ducati 916

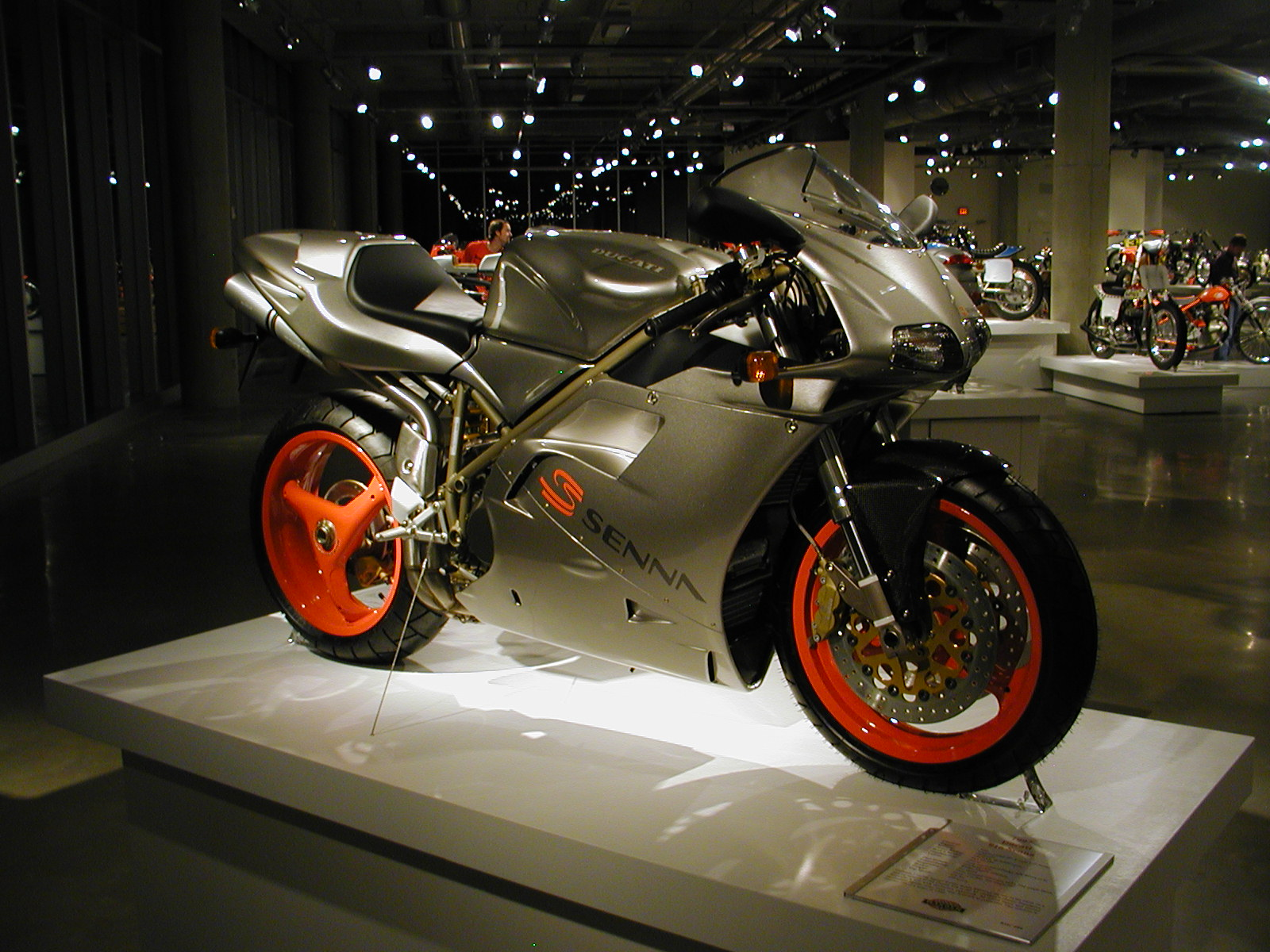
Ducati 916 Senna (special edition aimed to benefit Instituto Ayrton Senna)

The first development of the 916 model family can be traced back to the development of the four-valve Ducati engine, the Desmoquattro, through the development and racing of the earlier Pantah models, to the road-going 851 and 888 models.

The chief designer of Ducati motorcycles since the 1970s was Fabio Taglioni (1920–2001), who introduced the Pantah in 1979. The engine was updated in the 1990s in the SuperSport (SS) series and all modern Ducati engines are derivatives of the Pantah, which used its camshafts to both open and close the engine's valves, eliminating the usual valve closing springs, a system called 'desmodromic'. Taglioni, did not, however, have an interest in four-valve head engines, and so this was left to his successor. (Note: "For almost 30 years, Fabio Taglioni's talent had set Ducati on its course. ... But the maestro chose largely to ignore the development potential inherent in four-valve cylinder heads, however. This was left to his successor, Massimo Bordi."—The Art of the Motorcycle) The eight-valve V-twin was the work of Taglioni's successor, Massimo Bordi.

Designed by Massimo Tamburini and Sergio Robbiano and his team at the Cagiva Research Centre in San Marino, the 916's water-cooled engine was a revision of that of its predecessor, the 888, with larger displacement and a new engine management system. The greater displacement was accomplished by increasing the crankshaft stroke from 64 mm to 66 mm, keeping the same 94 mm bore size as the 888, resulting in a capacity of 916 cc. (By the time the 916 was introduced, the final 851/888 Corse engines had also had their bore sizes increased to 96 mm resulting in 'race only' capacities of 926 cc and 955 cc respectively.)

The 916 was a smaller motorcycle than the 888, with a chrome-moly trellis frame which was shared with the Ducati 748 in 1995 and beyond. This was combined with striking new bodywork that featured aggressive lines. In contrast to Japanese inline four-cylinder competitors of the time, its V-twin engine produced less outright power, but a more even torque spread. The 916 model was replaced by the 996 model in 1999. The 916 copied some design elements from Honda's NR750.

Design of the Ducati 916 was a synthesis of form and function:

- The stylish single-sided swingarm was designed to make wheel changes faster during races.
- The underseat exhausts improve aerodynamic performance, and gave very clean lines. This feature was initially introduced on the Honda NR, and although Ducati was not the first, it has remained one of the trademark features of 916 line.

Journalist Kevin Ash suggested that although the 916 was "one of the most influential machines of the last twenty years", the design is actually derivative of the Honda NR750, with the shared elements of underseat exhaust, narrow waist, similar squared-off dual headlights, and single-sided swingarm holding a large-section rear tire.

=== Reception ===
The really big news for 1994, however, was the arrival of the ground-breaking 916. This machine's engine size matched its code number and had been achieved by increasing the stroke of the 888 from 64 to 66 mm. ... This was the work of Massimo Tamburini, who has been described as one of the greatest motorcycle designers of the late 20th century – and with good cause. ... To many enthusiasts around the world, the 916 was not simply the latest superbike, but the best there had ever been. It set new standards of performance, handling, and braking, but also style and charisma. ... The 916 changed the face of sports bikes in a way that only the original Suzuki GSX-R750 had managed a decade earlier.

— Mick Walker, Motorcycle: Evolution, Design, Passion

[W]ho could forget 1994 when Ducati stunned the world with the amazing 916? It was another Ducati-inspired revolution in the high-performance sports motorcycle category. With the 916, technology and style, performance and symmetry reached maximum levels. ... From the worlds most prestigious bike magazines, the 916 received the title 'Motorcycle of the year' and many other well-deserved compliments.

— Mirco De Cet, The Complete Encyclopedia of Classic Motorcycles

Making its debut in 1994, the Ducati 916 was admired because of its new design and outstanding technical features. At the time of introduction, the 916 was recognized by winning "every magazine's Bike of the Year award for 1994", and Ducati sold out its entire first year's production run in the United States before any had actually arrived there.

== 916 Senna ==
First presented at the Bologna Motor Show in December 1994, the 916 Senna was a special edition to commemorate Formula 1 World Champion, Ayrton Senna, an avid Ducati enthusiast who endorsed the model's release shortly before his death in May 1994. At the time, the project was facilitated by the fact that Claudio Castiglioni, Ducati's owner, was a personal friend of Senna's. In total, between 1995, 1998 and 2001, Ducati released three "Senna" editions and, in every instance, net proceeds were donated to the Instituto Ayrton Senna charity.

== Racing ==
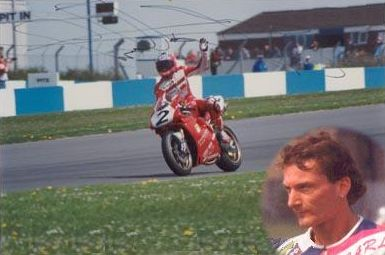
Carl Fogarty on his Ducati 916

Ducati won 4 Superbike World Championships with the 916, in 1994–1996, and in 1998, with riders Carl Fogarty and Troy Corser. Ducati won the Manufacturer's Championship in all those years.

Year	Rider	Victories	Bike	Manufacturer's Championship
1994	Carl Fogarty	11	Ducati 916	Ducati
1995	Carl Fogarty	13	Ducati 916	Ducati
1996	Troy Corser	7	Ducati 916	Ducati
1998	Carl Fogarty	3	Ducati 916	Ducati

On March 1 and 2 in 1999, at the AHRMA Classic Days at Daytona International Speedway, Devin Battley rode a 1998 Ducati 916 to two victories. First, in the eight-lap Formula One class, and then in the Battle of the Twins Open class.

== Subsequent models and legacy ==
The 916 was later replaced by the 996 and 998 with similar design but revised engines and more power. (Note: "Other features introduced on the 916 included a single-sided swing arm, patented adjustable steering, an exhaust system with twin mufflers exiting just underneath the seat, and one of the most distinctive styling jobs ever seen on two wheels."—The Art of the Motorcycle)

Massimo Tamburini went on to design the MV Agusta F4, the bike which is seen as his replacement for the 916 range, and it shares many similarities with the 916 especially in the tail section. Both of these Tamburini designs were featured in the Guggenheim Museum's 1998 The Art of the Motorcycle exhibit.

Looking back over a decade after its introduction, it is regularly placed on top lists of important designs in motorcycle history by authorities like the Guggenheim Museum, Bennetts, and Design Week; and authors Ian Falloon, Hugo Wilson, and Margaret Henderson. In a retrospective on the 1990s, Motorcyclist magazine simply stated, "1994: Ducati 916 debuts. Did anything else happen that year?"

In addition to the Guggenheim exhibit noted above, an example is also held by the San Francisco Museum of Modern Art.
