= List of BSA motorcycles =

This is a list of British manufacturer Birmingham Small Arms Company (BSA) motorcycles from the 1930s until the end of the marque in the 1970s. The list is tabulated by engine type and period.

== V-twins ==
Model	Engine	First year	Last year	Notes
Model E	770cc cc	1919	1924	side-valve V twin
G30-G35	985 cc	1930	1935	side-valve
G14	985 cc	1936	1940	side-valve
J34, J35, J12	499 cc	1934	1936	overhead valve
Y13	748 cc	1936	1938	overhead valve

== B series ==
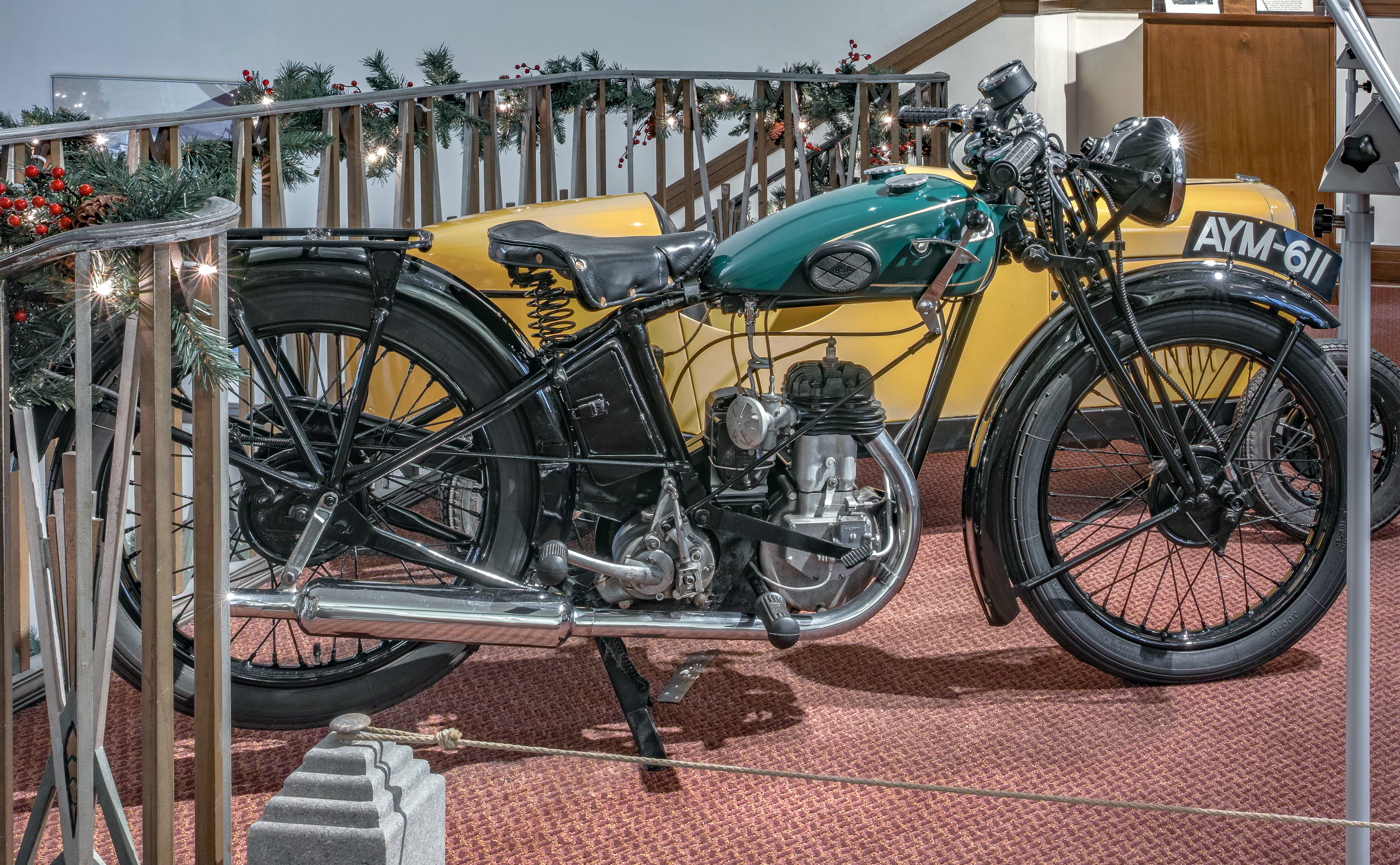
A 1933 BSA B1 motorcycle at the Auburn Cord Duesenberg Automobile Museum in Auburn, Indiana, U.S.A.

The B-series were single cylinder models of 250 cc, 350 cc and 500 cc. After the Second World War only 350 cc and 500 cc overhead valve models were continued.

Model	Engine	First year	Last year	Notes
B33-1 - B35-1, B1	249 cc	1933	1936	side-valve
B33-2 - B35-2, B2	249 cc	1933	1936	overhead valve
B33-3 - B35-3, B3 Blue Star	249 cc	1933	1936	overhead valve
R33-4 - R35-4, R4	349 cc	1933	1936	overhead valve
R33-5 - R35-5, R5 Blue Star	349 cc	1933	1936	overhead valve
W32-6, W33-6, W34-7, W35-6, W6	499 cc	1932	1936	side-valve
W32-7, W33-7, W34-8, W35-7	499 cc	1932	1935	overhead valve
W33-8, W34-9, W35-8 Blue Star	499 cc	1933	1935	overhead valve
W33-9, W34-10, W35-9	499 cc	1933	1935	overhead valve
B20 Tourer	249 cc	1937	1938	side-valve
B21 Sports	249 cc	1937	1939	overhead valve
B22 Empire Star	249 cc	1937	1938	overhead valve
B23 Tourer	348 cc	1937	1939	side-valve
B24 Empire / Silver Star	348 cc	1937	1939	overhead valve
B25 Competition	348 cc	1937	1939	overhead valve
B26 Sports	348 cc	1937	1939	overhead valve
B29	348 cc	1940		overhead valve
B30				overhead valve
B31	348 cc	1945	1959	overhead valve
B32	348 cc	1946	1957	overhead valve
B33	499 cc	1947	1960	overhead valve
B34	499 cc	1947	1957	overhead valve

== M series ==
In the 1930s the M series was a mixture of overhead valve and side-valve models. During and after the Second World War only the side-valve models of this series were continued, typically for use by the armed forces or in sidecar combinations.

Model	Engine	First year	Last year	Notes
M33-10, M34-12, M35-10, M10	596 cc	1933	1936	side-valve
M33-11, M34-13, M35-11	596 cc	1933	1935	overhead valve
M19 Deluxe	349 cc	1937	1938	overhead valve
M22	496 cc	1937	1939	overhead valve
M23 Silver Star/Empire Star	496 cc	1937	1940	overhead valve
M24 Gold Star	496 cc	1938	1939	overhead valve
M20	496 cc	1937	1955	side-valve. Thousands of this model were supplied to the British Army
M21	591 cc	1937	1963	side-valve. The UK's Automobile Association used this model in sidecar combinations
M33	499 cc	1947	1957	B33 overhead valve engine in M series plunger frame for civilian sidecar work

== Pre-unit C series ==
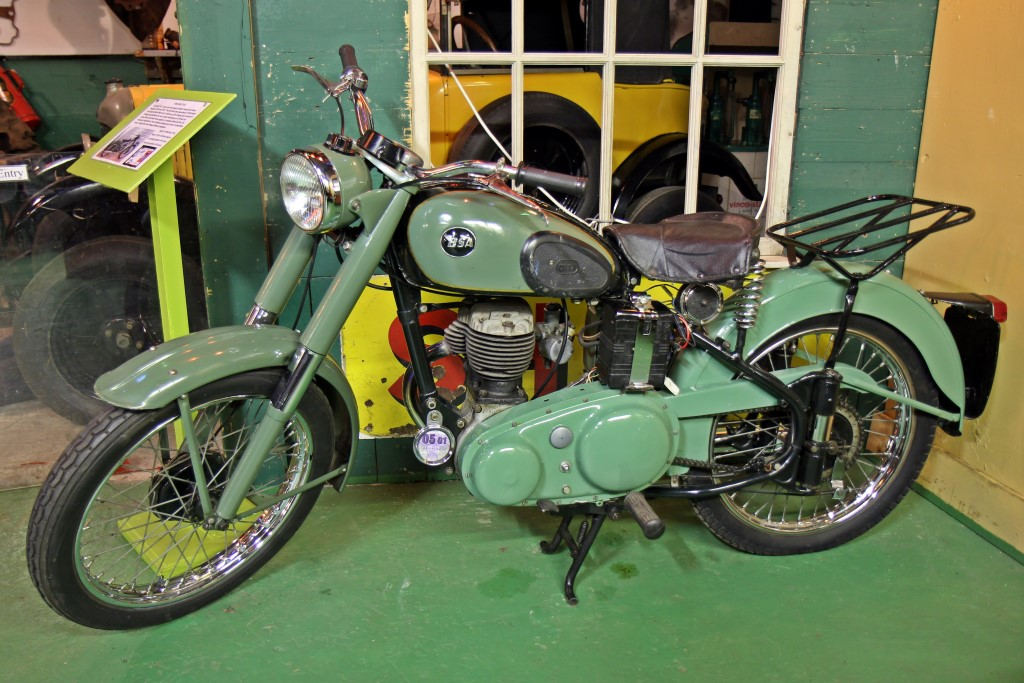
A BSA C10L at Wirral Transport Museum, Birkenhead

The C-series were 250 cc single-cylinder models & a 350 cc side-valve model for 1940 only

Model	Engine	First year	Last year	Notes
C10	250 cc	1938	1953	side-valve engine
C11	250 cc	1939	1953	overhead valve engine, dynamo electrics
C12sv	350 cc	1940	1940	side-valve engine, dynamo electrics, girder Forks, ridged rear,
C11G	250 cc	1954	1956	overhead valve engine, alternator instead of dynamo
C12	250 cc	1956	1958	overhead valve engine, swinging arm suspension
C10L	250 cc	1953	1957	side-valve engine

== Bantam series ==
All Bantams were single cylinder two-stroke machines

Model	Engine	First year	Last year	Notes
D1 Bantam	125 cc	1948	1963 Bantam De Luxe 1949 starting March 24 becomes the BD1 in 1950 BD1 bantam 1950–1953	Early examples had rigid frames; later models had plunger suspension
D3 Bantam Major	150 cc	1954	1957	All-welded swinging arm frame - some had plunger rear suspension
D5 Bantam Super	175 cc	1958	1958	All-welded swinging arm frame similar to D5
D7 Bantam Super	175 cc	1959	1966	Swinging-arm frame with separate rear subframe bolted on
D10 Silver Bantam, Bantam Supreme, Bantam Sports and Bushman	175 cc	1966	1967	Some models had four-ratio gearbox
D14/4 Bantam Supreme, Bantam Sports and Bushman	175 cc	1968	1969	All models had four-ratio gearbox
D175 Bantam Sports and Bushman	175 cc	1969	1971	With C15 front forks and centrally located spark plug

== Unit-construction singles ==
Model	Engine	First year	Last year	Notes
C15	250 cc	1958	1967
C15T	250 cc	1959	1965
C15S	250 cc	1959	1965
SS80	250 cc	1961	1966	High-performance version of C15
B40	350 cc	1960	1965
SS90	350 cc	1962	1965	High-performance version of B40
B44 GP	441 cc	1965	1967	the first unit single with oil-bearing frame. Used super strong/lightweight Reynolds 531 tubing aimed at competition use
B44 VE "Victor Enduro"	441 cc	1966	1970
B44 "Victor Roadster"	441 cc	1966	1970	From 1968 to 1970, called "441 Shooting Star"
B40WD	350 cc	1967		2,000 for Ministry of Defence
C25 Barracuda	250 cc	1967		Original UK designation for the Starfire
B25 Starfire	250 cc	1968	1970	Higher performance model developed from the C15
B25FS Fleetstar	250 cc	1968	1971	Made with low-compression engine to increase reliability and fuel economy for police and civilian fleet use
B25SS Gold Star 250	250 cc	1971		Oil-in-frame model developed from the Starfire
B25T Victor Trail 250	250 cc	1971		Off-road oil-in-frame model developed from the Starfire
B50SS Gold Star	500 cc	1971	1972
B50T Trail	500 cc	1971	1972
B50MX Motorcross	500 cc	1971	1972	In 1974 sold as Triumph TR5MX for US

== Post-War twins ==
All BSA parallel twins were pushrod operated overhead valve machines. The A7 and A10 models were semi-unit construction until about 1953 and pre-unit construction thereafter. All A50, A65 and A70 models were unit construction.

Model	Engine	First year	Last year	Notes
A7	500 cc	1947	1962	BSA's first parallel twin. Called "Flash" in the US after 1954
A7S Star Twin	500 cc	1949	1954	Tuned version of the A7
A7SS Shooting Star	500 cc	1954	1962	Tuned A7 in swinging arm frame
A10 Golden Flash	650 cc	1950	1962	BSA's first 650 cc parallel twin. Known as "Royal Tourist" in the US from 1960
A10 Super Flash	650 cc	1953	1954	Limited edition for homologation for production racing in the USA
A10 Road Rocket	650 cc	1954	1957	Tuned version of "Golden Flash"
A10 Spitfire Scrambler	650 cc	1957	1963	Tuned off-road racer (US only)
A10 Super Rocket	650 cc	1958	1963	Amal TT 'racing' carburettor and new "357" full-race camshaft
A10 Rocket Gold Star	650 cc	1962	1963	Special - tuned Super Rocket in a Gold Star frame. Known as "Gold Star Twin" in the US
A50 Star	500 cc	1962	1970	Also called "Star Twin" and "Royal Star" Called "Royal Star" in all markets from 1966 onwards
A50C Cyclone Road	500 cc	1964	1965	Tuned version of A50 Star (US only)
A50C Cyclone Competition	500 cc	1964	1965	Tuned off-road version of A50 Star (US only)
A50C Cyclone Clubman	500 cc	1965		Special for production racing
A50 Wasp	500 cc	1966	1968	Replacement for off-road Cyclone Clubman and available in all markets
A65 Star	650 cc	1962	1966	Sometimes called "Star Twin". Called "Royal Star" in the US
A65R Rocket	650 cc	1964	1965	Sports model with 9:1 compression, separate headlight, and sports mudguards. Known as "Thunderbolt Rocket" in the US
A65T Thunderbolt	650 cc	1966	1972	Single carburettor. From 1971 had oil-bearing frame
A65L Lightning	650 cc	1964	1972	Twin carburettors. Known as Lightning Rocket in the US before 1966. From 1971 had oil-bearing frame
A65 Spitfire Hornet	650 cc	1964	1967	Twin carburettor off-road racer.(US only) Known as "Hornet" from 1966
A65LC Lightning Clubman	650 cc	1965		Special for production racing
A65S Spitfire	650 cc	1966	1968	High performance model produced in Mk II, Mk III and Mk IV versions
A65F Firebird Scrambler	650 cc	1968	1971	Twin carburettors. From 1971 had oil-bearing frame, high level exhaust pipes on left hand side
A70L Lightning	750 cc	1971		Limited edition for homologation for production racing in the USA
Fury	350 cc	1971	1972	Prototype only (never produced)
T65 Thunderbolt	650 cc	1973		Rebadged Triumph TR6 Trophy

== Triples ==
See Triumph Triples for corresponding Triumph models)

Model	Engine	First year	Last year	Notes
A75R Rocket Three	750 cc	1969	1972
A75RV Rocket Three	750 cc	1971	1972	5-speed gearbox (only three produced in 1972)

== Miscellaneous ==
Model name	Engine	First year	Last year	Note
Model L	349 cc	1923	1935	Overhead-valve, sidevalve & sloper versions
Slopers	L 349 cc - S 493 cc - H 557 cc	1927	1935	L 27-28 only, S 27–35, H 28–33, various configurations, OHV, SV & Twin Exhaust
A30-1, A30-2	175 cc two-stroke	1929	1930	Unit-construction model in two-speed and three-speed versions respectively
Winged Wheel	35 cc two-stroke	1953	1955	In-hub engine for bicycle
Dandy	70 cc two stroke	1956	1962	Lightweight scooter
Sunbeam	175 cc two-stroke or 250 cc four-stroke	1959	1965	Scooter
Beagle	75 cc four-stroke	1963	1965	Lightweight motorcycle
Brigand/Beaver/Boxer/GT50	50 cc two-stroke	1979		British frame designed by B.J. "Bertie" Goodman, with Italian Franco Morini engine

== See also ==
- List of AMC motorcycles
- List of Ariel motorcycles
- List of Douglas motorcycles
- List of Norton motorcycles
- List of Royal Enfield motorcycles
- List of Triumph motorcycles
- List of Velocette motorcycles
- List of Vincent motorcycles
