= B44 =

B44 may refer to:

- Bundesstraße 44, a federal highway in Germany
- B44 (New York City bus), a public transit line in Brooklyn, New York City, United States
- HLA-B44, a HLA-B serotype
- XB-44 Superfortress, an aircraft
- b4-4, a Canadian boy band
- BSA B44, a British motorcycle
- BSA B44 Shooting Star, a British motorcycle
