= BSA B40 =

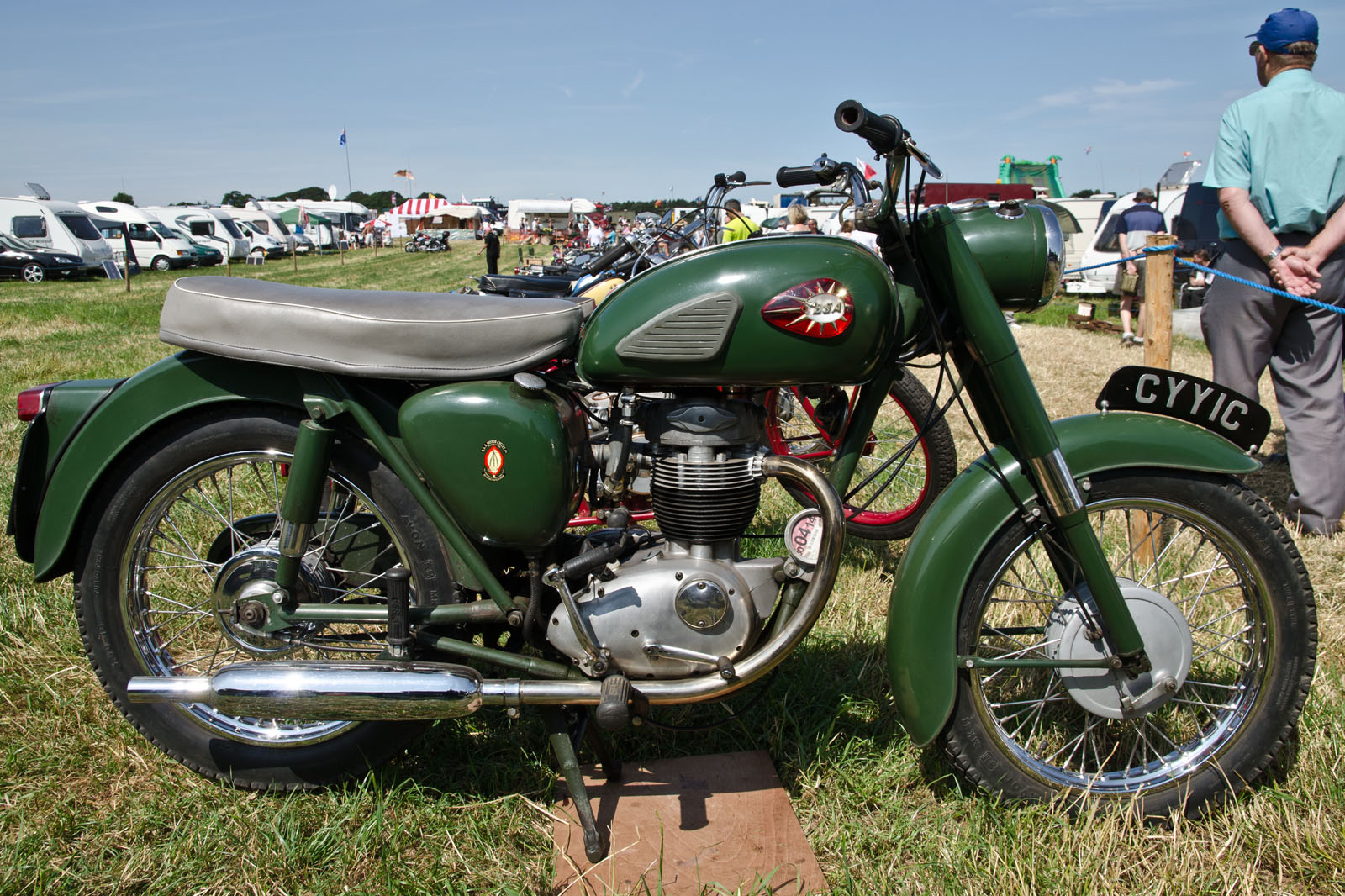
- 1965 B40 Star
- Manufacturer: BSA motorcycles
- Parent company: Birmingham Small Arms Company
- Production: 1961-1970
- Assembly: Small Heath, Birmingham
- Engine: 343 cc air-cooled, unit construction single-cylinder OHV four-stroke
- Bore / stroke: 79 mm × 70 mm (3.1 in × 2.8 in)
- Compression ratio: 7:1; SS90: 8.75:1
- Power: 21 bhp (16 kW) @ 7,000 rpm SS90: 24 bhp (18 kW) @ 7,000 rpm
- Transmission: Wet, multi-plate clutch, 4-speed gearbox, chain drive
- Frame type: Single cradle
- Suspension: Front: telescopic forks Rear: swinging arm
- Brakes: Drum brakes front & rear
- Wheelbase: 1,360 mm

The BSA B40 was a series of 350 cc (21 cu in) unit construction single-cylinder OHV four-stroke motorcycles made by the Birmingham Small Arms Company. Developed from the BSA C15, the machines were produced between 1961 and 1967 for civilian use. Military versions were manufactured from 1967 to 1970. Around 14,000 machines were built in total.

== Overview ==
As a reaction to the emergence of high-tech, high performance Honda lightweights that were starting to appear (Mike Hailwood had won the 1961 Lightweight TT on a DOHC, twin-cylinder, 125 cc machine), BSA increased the performance its lightweight by boring the C15 out to 350 cc.

The 67 mm bore of the C15 was increased to 79 mm to give a capacity of 343 cc for the new B40 model. Although the bottom end was beefed up, it still retained the plain big end. Concerns over reliability led to the compression ratio to be reduced to 7:1. A new cast iron barrel was produced with the pushrod tunnel built in. The engine produced 21 bhp (16 kW) at 7,000 rpm.

C15 cycle parts were retained except for heavier duty front forks, a 7" front brake and 18" wheels.

Sports, enduro/trials, military and police versions were produced during the model's lifetime.

== Models ==
=== B40 Star ===
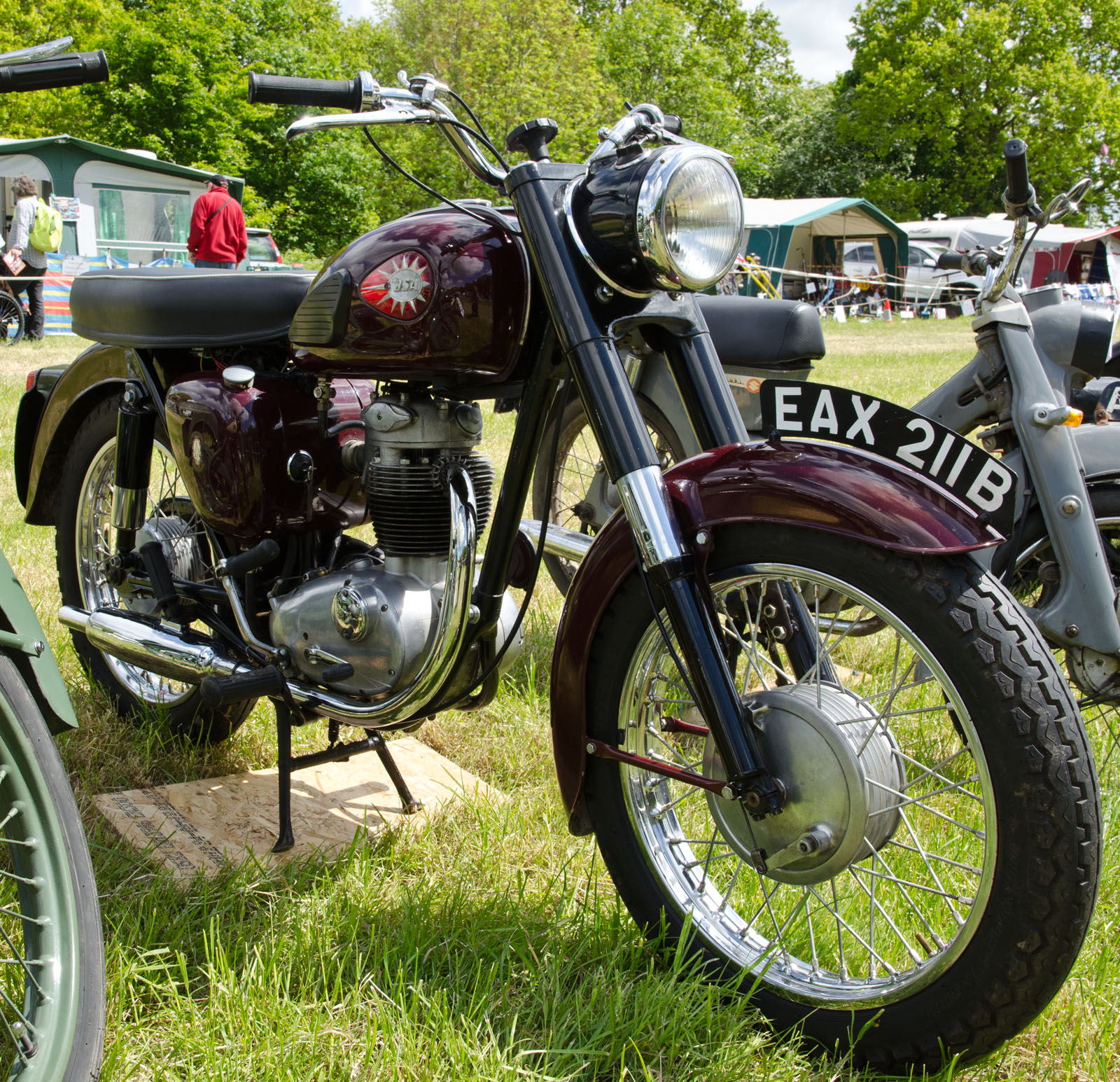
1964 B40 Star

The first model of the series was the B40 Star, introduced in 1961. The new 350 cc engine had 21 bhp, which gave a cruising speed of 50 - 55 mph and a top speed of 75 mph. The Star had deeply valenced, painted mudguards; metal fork shrouds and the headlamp was fitted in a nacelle. Finish was red with black frame and forks or all black. American variants had chrome sides to the petrol tank.

In 1962, the big end was changed from plain bearings to roller bearing, and in 1965 the points were moved from the 'distributor'-type device behind the cylinder to the timing case, and the clutch operating mechanism redesigned.

Very few machines were made in 1967, its final year. These machines were fitted with a roller bearing timing side main bearing. These engines, prefixed BD40G, are generally acknowledged as having the most robust bottom end.

The model was initially known as the Star Sportsman in the US, but this was changed to the Star in 1962 ahead of the SS90 model being launched. In 1964 the name was changed again in the US to the Super Star.

=== B40 Sports Star SS90 ===
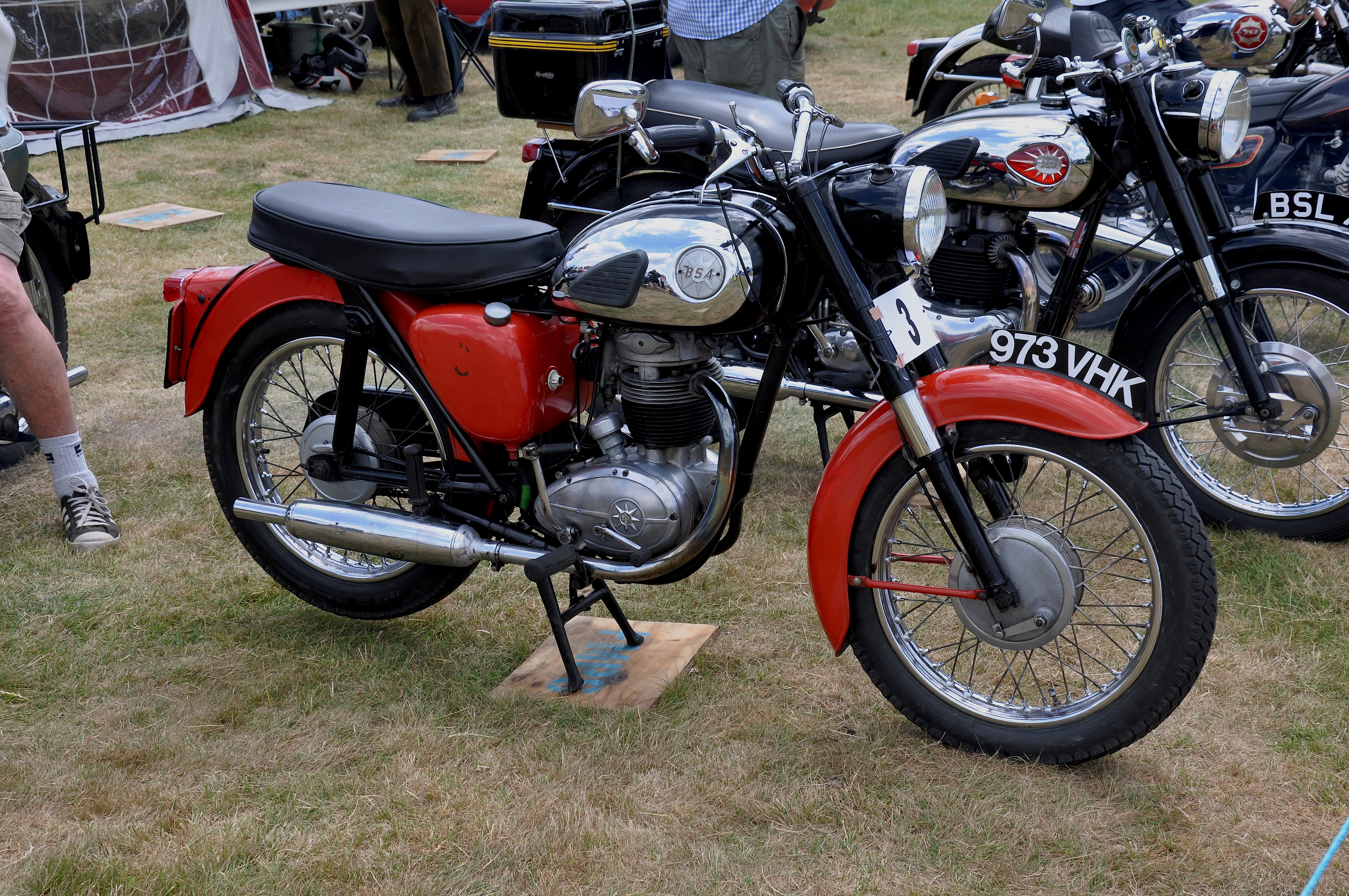
1962 UK model B40 Sports Star SS90

Launched in June 1962, the B40 Sports Star SS90 had similar tuning modifications to the C15 SS80. The compression ratio was raised to 8.75:1, larger valves and a bigger carburettor, which raised the power to 24 bhp (18 kW) @ 7,000 rpm. The machine was fitted with a roller bearing big end and a close ratio gearbox. Initially UK SS90 models were distinguished by the chrome sides of the petrol tank.

Introduced in the US in 1963 as the BSA SS90, the American model was finished in blue and had chrome mudguards and rubber gaiters instead of metal fork shrouds. In 1964, the US model was referred to as the Sportsman, and the UK model was fitted with the chrome mudguards. In 1965 both variants were fitted with a separate headlight, the US version now being called the Super Sports.

=== B40 Enduro Star ===
First introduced in 1963 in limited quantities the US-only B40 Enduro Star went into full production in 1964. The model was built around a trials frame a 19" front wheel to give good ground clearance. It had an alloy tank, single seat, high-level exhaust and a half width 7" front brake. The machine had the low compression engine and a wide ratio gearbox. Although the machine was street legal and fitted with lights, no battery was fitted.

The model won numerous competitions in America, including the 1963 500 mile Jack Pine Lightweight Competition and the 1964 National Championship Endurance Run. The model was discontinued after 1965.

=== B40 Police ===
A special police version, the B40 Police, was produced in 1964 and 1965.

== Military versions ==
=== B40 WD ===
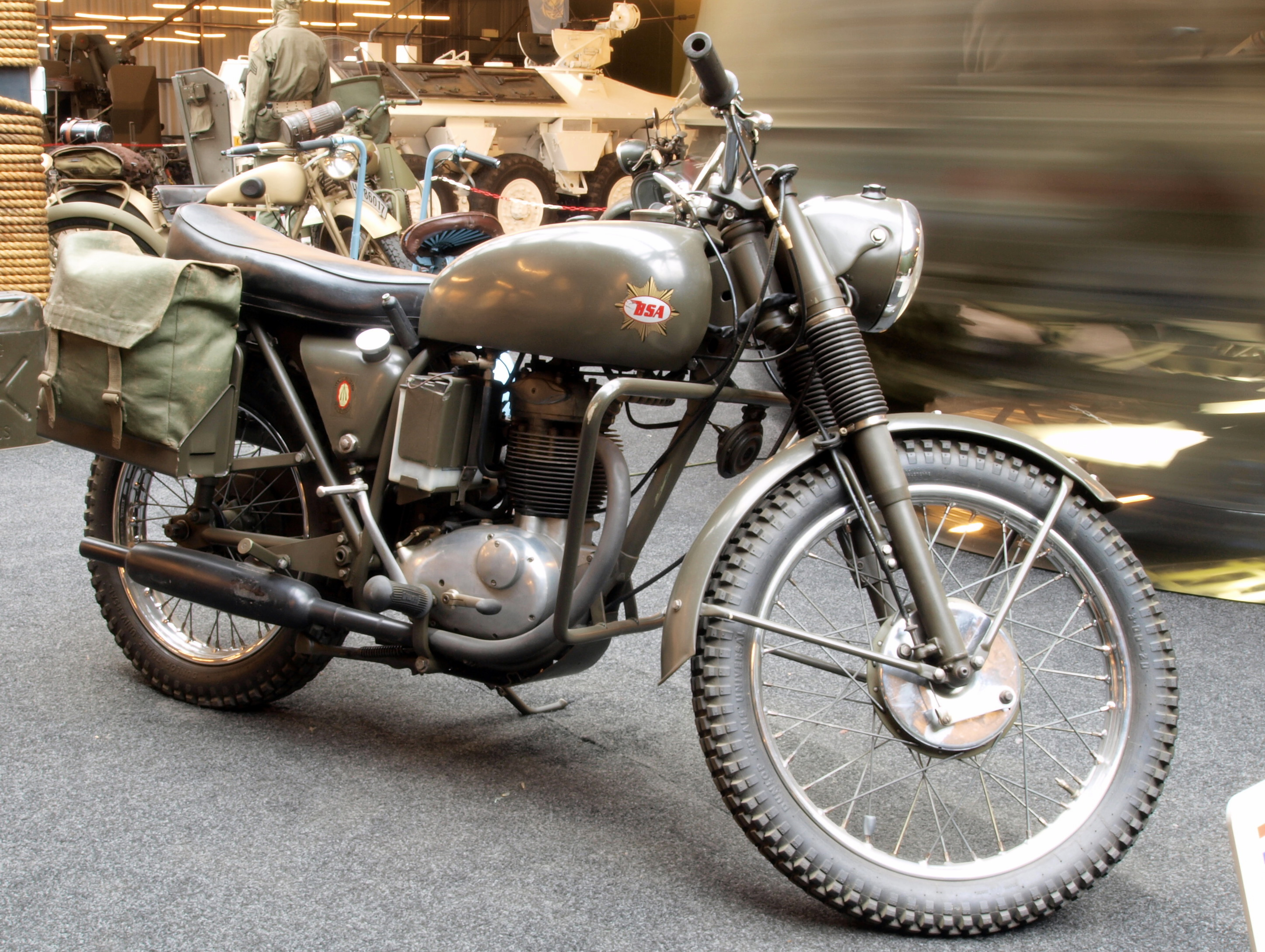
BSA B40 WD

In 1965, the newly formed Royal Corps of Transport, who took over the responsibility from army transportation, issued a requirement for a motorcycle to replace its ageing fleet of mainly BSA M20 and Matchless G3/L machines. BSA submitted four B40s built to army specifications for evaluation by the Fighting Vehicles Research and Development Establishment near Chertsey, Surrey. Triumph also submitted four 500 cc machines. Both types had major defects and modified versions were submitted for further evaluation. After an 10,00 mile reliability test, an order was placed for 2,000 B40s, 880 of these being destined for the BAOR. The initial order was delivered in 1967 and further machines supplied until 1970.

Part of the army specification was that the machine should have a butterfly carburettor as they were concerned that a carb with a slide throttle may stick open in adverse conditions. Although a Solex carburettor was fitted to the machine displayed at the 1966 Earls Court motorcycle show, production models used an Amal 398 butterfly carb, which was usually fitted to stationary engines. This carb restricted engine performance.

Air and oil filtration was upgraded for the WD machines, a large paper air filter was fitted behind the left-hand side panel. This necessitated the battery to be moved to a new carrier between oil tank and engine. A fibre glass cover protected the battery. An external Vokes oil filter was fitted on a bracket above the primary chaincase.

The machine was built around an all-welded frame derived from the C15 competition machines. Heavy duty front forks and quickly-detachable wheels were fitted with 7" brakes front and rear. Frames were fitted to both sides of the rear wheel to accommodate panniers. The rear chain was fully enclosed and a 3.5 gallon tank fitted. Chrome parts were dull-chromed to reduce reflectability and paintwork was "deep bronze green".

In total, around 3,000 machines were supplied to the British Military including 141 to the RAF and 34 to the Royal Navy.

Denmark

The Royal Danish Army ordered an initial batch of 400 machines in 1967 to replace their fleet of Nimbus Model C machines. Further machines were ordered in 1969 and 1970, bringing the total number purchased to 1,100. The machines had rear mudguard stays fitted, which distinguish them from the UK model. Used for escort and messenger duties they were replaced in 1980 with Yamaha DT250MX machines.

=== B40 AWD ===
The Australian Army stated negotiations for a supply of motorcycles in 1960 with BSA, Triumph, Norton, Velocette and Royal Enfield. The BSA C15 was not suitable as it wouldn'r run on 85 octane petrol. Prior to the B40s release to the public, BSA supplied some C15 Trials/B40 hybrids for evaluation. In early 1964 BSA supplied a further 20 of these hybrid machines for an "Extended User Trials" programme. A single UK specification BSA B40WD was also supplied in 1965.

An order for 450 machines was placed in November 1966, the machines being delivered in early 1967. The Australian machines were fitted with an Amal Concentric 926 carburettor. These machines remained in service until 1972, when they were replaced with the Suzuki GS400.

=== B40 WD Mk2 ===
For 1968, BSA updated the WD inline with the changes to other single cylinder models. The front forks and wheel assembly was the same as used on the B25 Starfire/B44 Shooting Star, as were the swinging arm, chain guard and rear wheel. A wider 400 x 18 rear wheel was fitted. The Vokes oil filter was replaced by a "British Filters" item and an Amal 626 Concentric carburettor fitted.

Sales were slow, existing customers not wanting to complicate their stocks of spares. Australia did order 48 machines for evaluation, but no further orders were placed. The main customer was Jordan's Arab Army, who ordered 200 machines finished in sand colour.

==== B40 Roughrider ====
With poor sales to the military, BSA produced a civilian version, the B40 Roughrider, aimed at Australian sheep farmers. A batch of 108 machines was made from July 1969. Although most went to Australia, 22 were sold in the UK, 10 going to the Hampshire Forestry Commission. As an option, a high-level exhaust and a single seat could be fitted.

== Bibliography ==
- Fraser, Peter (27 April 1967). "Trials Irons in Battledress". Motor Cycle. pp. 516–518.
- Henshaw, Peter (2015). BSA 350, 441 & 500 Singles: Unit Construction Singles C15, B25, C25, B40, B44 & B50 1958-1973. Veloce Publishing Ltd. ISBN 9781845847562.
- Huber, Tim (8 November 2017). "Divisive Classic – 1964 BSA B40". Bike-urious.
- Melling, Frank (7 August 2009). "Memorable Motorcycle BSA B.40 350". Motorcycle USA. Archived from the original on 5 September 2015.
- Ratio, Rupert. "B40 Military Mk2 and Roughrider". bsawdb40.com.
- Sutton, D. J. (1984). The Story of the Royal Army Service Corps and Royal Corps of Transport, 1945-1982. L. Cooper. ISBN 9780436506062.
- Wright, Owen (1992). BSA: The Complete Story. Crowood Press. ISBN 9781852237028.
