= BSA B50 =

British single cylinder motorcycle, produced by BSA in the 1970s

- Manufacturer: BSA
- Production: 1971–1973
- Engine: 499 cc (30.5 cu in) air cooled, four stroke, OHV unit single
- Power: 34 hp (25 kW)
- Transmission: 4-speed, multi-plate wet clutch
- Weight: 310 lb (140 kg) (dry)

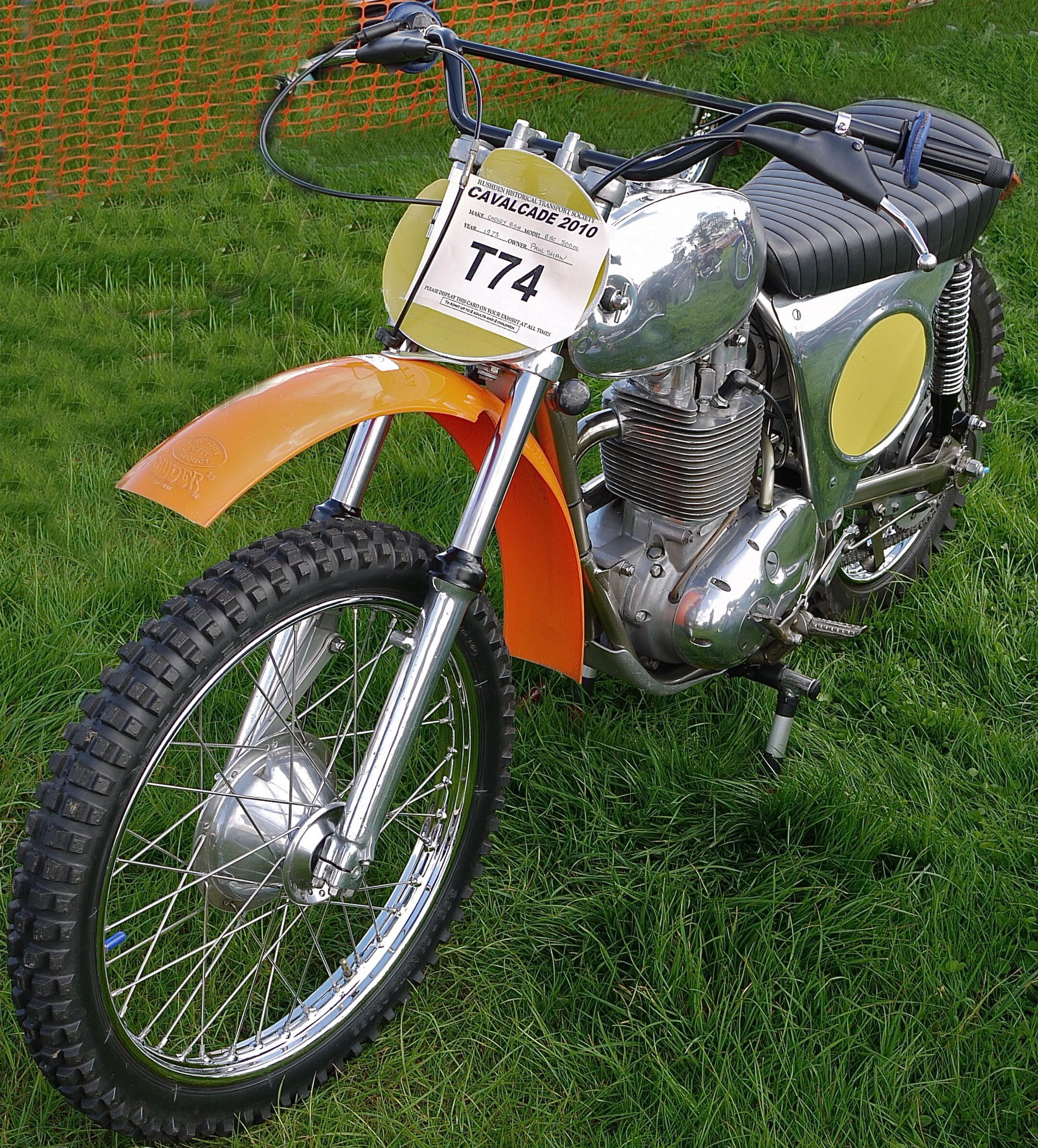
Cheney BSA 500cc B50 Victor 19

The BSA B50 was a single-cylinder 499 cc (30.5 cu in) ohv motorcycle, produced by BSA at their factory in Small Heath, Birmingham. The last of the big capacity unit-construction singles from the Birmingham Small Arms company, it had an alloy engine with a bore of 84 mm (3.3 in) and a stroke of 90 mm (3.5 in). As well as the road version, special models were produced for off-road competition use.

== Development ==
BSA's earlier 500cc single was the BSA Gold Star, a pre-unit machine with a duplex frame similar to that of the Golden Flash twin. The Gold Star was not considered suitable for the progression to unit construction. The name was revived when the 250 cc BSA C15/Starfire was eventually developed into the 500 cc B50 (via the B40 & B44). The dry sump B50 included features such as "oil in the frame" and the electrics in a single removable 'pod'. BSA kept production costs down by using parts across a range of models, launched in 1971. About 5,700 were built. Some B50s were modified for off-road use by specialist builders such as Eric Cheney.

== Racing success ==
B50 bikes were successful in both road-racing and off-road events. A modestly modified B50 Gold Star 500 entered by Mead & Tomkinson of Hereford, England and ridden by Nigel Rollason and Clive Brown won the 500cc class in both the Thruxton 500 miler and the Barcelona 24 hours ( at the Montjuïc circuit), and won the Zolder 24-hour race outright. Also, a B50 fielded by Mead & Tomkinson once held the class lap record in the Production Isle of Man TT.

After the demise of BSA, Alan Clews bought up remaining B50 part stocks and set up Clews Competition Motorcycles, producing successful CCM motocross bikes based on the B50.

== B50SS (Gold Star) ==
The BSA B50SS 'street scrambler' Gold Star was designed for road use and was partly aimed at the US market and proved its credentials by winning the 500cc class in the Thruxton 500 miler and the Barcelona 24-hour endurance race.

== B50T (Trail) ==
Trail version The B50T was specifically designed with the fast-growing trail riding boom in mind in the US, with the bike using many parts common to both the SS and MX versions.

== B50MX (Moto Cross) ==
The B50MX was designed for off-road competition and produced between 1971 and 1973. The very last MX's produced were therefore coming off the production line after the demise of BSA and were 'badged' as the Triumph TR5MX.

== Triumph TR5T Trophy Trail/Adventurer ==
In an attempt to make new models from existing BSA/Triumph parts, a Triumph T100C engine was fitted into modified B50 cycle parts. Launched in late 1972 (1973 model year), the new model was called the Triumph Adventurer in the UK and the Trophy Trail in the US, where most of the machines were sold on the East Coast. The model used Lucas electrics, Nippon Denso Speedo and rev counter and handlebar switches from Yamaha. Production continued into 1974, after which the model was dropped. A British team finished second in the 1973 IDST on these machines.

== Norton P92 ==
As part of an attempt to produce new models from existing parts, NVT produced a few prototype P92 models. This model comprised a B50 engine in a BSA Fury/Triumph Bandit frame using Isolastic mountings from the Norton Commando. The US DOT had mandated that all motorcycles sold in the US should have a left hand gear change. The B50 had the gear lever on the right, so to comply with this requirement, the engine was tilted forward in the frame and a gear linkage run under the gearbox to provide a left hand gear change. The model never progressed to production.

== B100 V-Twin (with two B50 cylinders ) ==
Specialist motorcycle designer Gerald Fitzpatrick created a 1000 cc BSA V-twin using parts from two B50 engines in 1977. The frame was a slimline featherbed Norton Atlas. Triumph considered putting the B100 into production but were not able to finance re-tooling costs.

The B100 prototype was ridden for two years and has been stored since but was featured in the magazine British Bike Mechanics in April 1978 and January 1988.
