= BSA B44 =

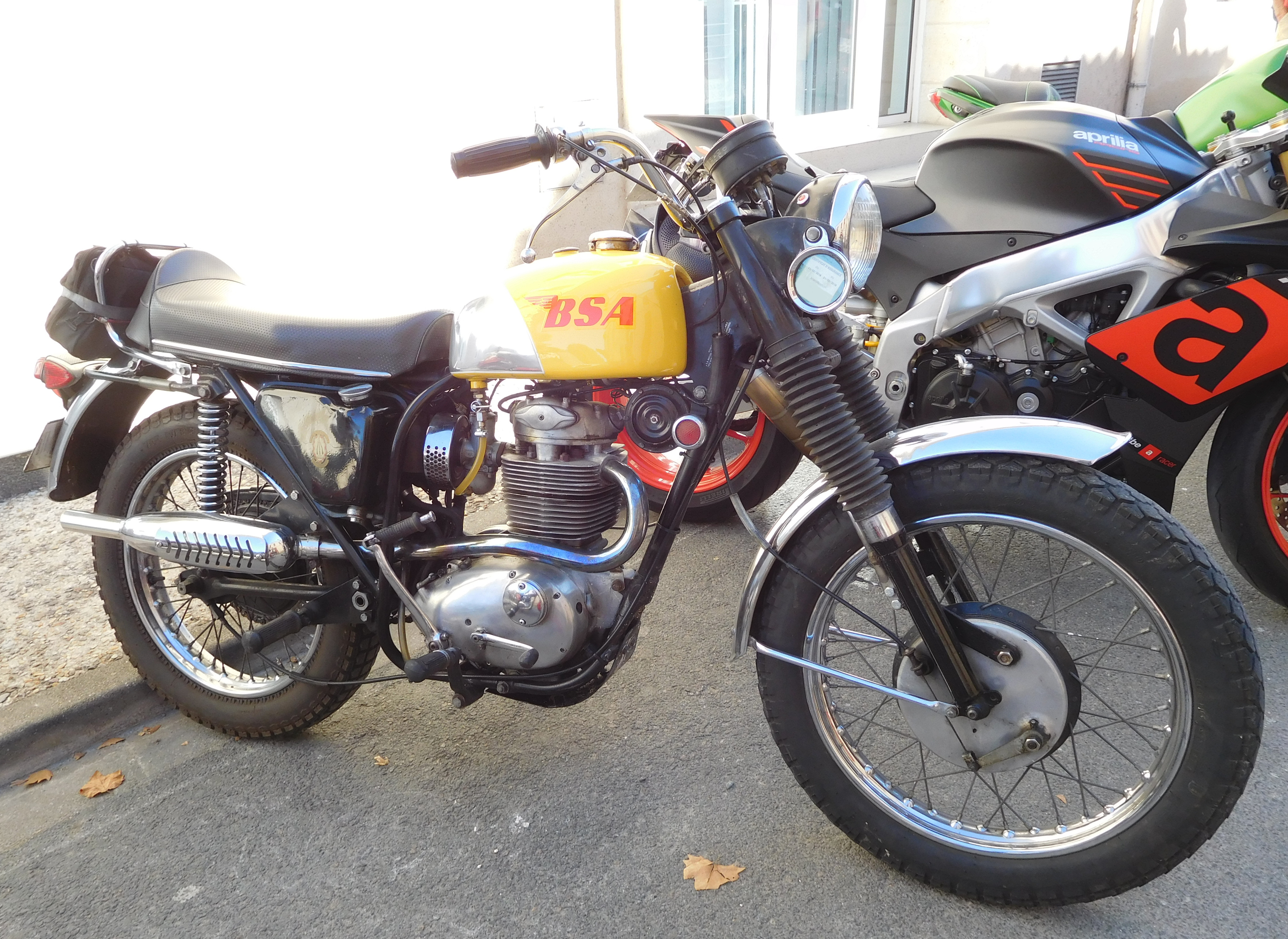
- B44VS Victor Special
- Manufacturer: BSA motorcycles
- Also called: Victor GP; Victor Enduro; Victor Special; Victor Roadster; Shooting Star
- Parent company: Birmingham Small Arms Company
- Production: 1966-1970
- Assembly: Small Heath, Birmingham
- Successor: BSA B50
- Engine: 441 cc air-cooled, unit construction single-cylinder OHV four-stroke
- Bore / stroke: 79 x 90 mm
- Transmission: Wet, multi-plate clutch, 4-speed gearbox, chain drive
- Frame type: Single cradle
- Suspension: Front: telescopic forks Rear: swinging arm
- Brakes: Drum brakes front & rear

The BSA B44 was a series of 441 cc (26.9 cu in) unit construction single-cylinder OHV four-stroke motorcycles made by the Birmingham Small Arms Company between 1966 and 1970. The machines were developed from the BSA World Championship Motocross machines, which were themselves based on the C15/B40.

== Background ==
In 1963 BSA began competing a C15T fitted with the 343 cc (20.9 cu in) B40 engine in various classes. Works rider Jeff Smith won the Scottish Six Days 350 cc cup that year and finished 3rd in the 500 cc Motocross World Championship.

Brian Martin, head of BSA's competition department, started a feasibility study to enlarge the B40 engine. The engine was enlarged to 421 cc (25.7 cu in), which was considered the maximum reliable size. For the 1964 Motocross season, the engine was fitted in a lightweight frame that carried the oil in the top tube. The machine weighed 228 lb (103 kg). Smith took this machine to 3 victories in the championship, and with 3 rounds to go, the displacement was increased to 441 cc (26.9 cu in). Smith won the final three rounds and beat the winner of the two previous championships, Swede Rolf Tibblin, to the title by a narrow margin.

Smith was dominant in the 1965 season on the 441 and had the title sewn up half-way through the season. In the final race, the East German GP, Smith used a pre-production model of the soon-to-be-announced Victor GP and finished sixth.

== Technical Details ==
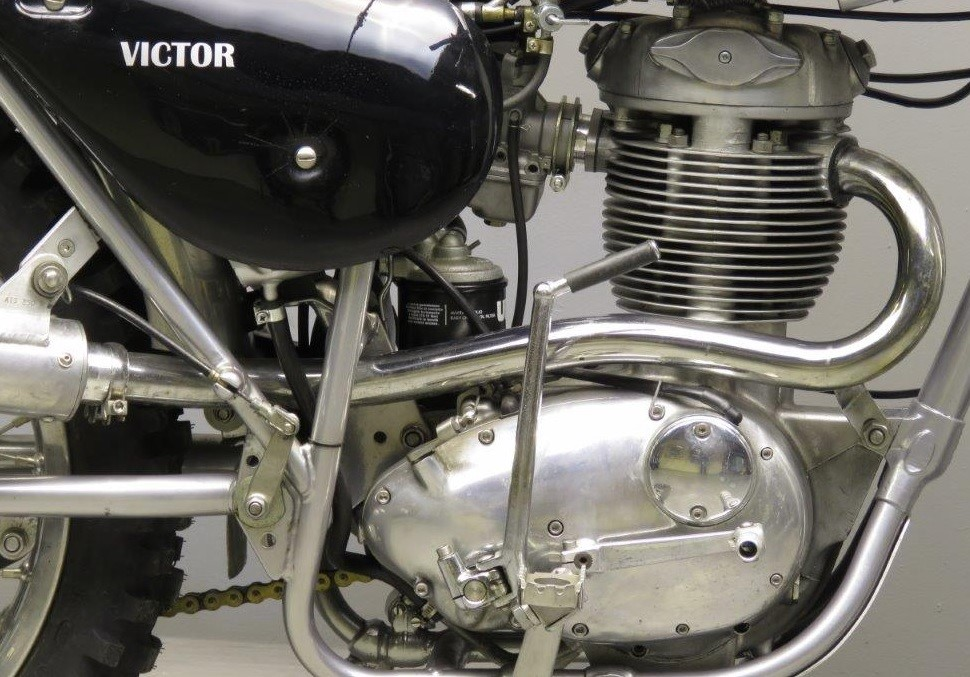
1967 Victor Enduro "round fin" engine

The 441 cc engine, developed by the BSA Competitions Department, was based on the B40. The extra capacity was obtained by increasing the B40's 70 mm stroke to 90 mm, the 79 mm bore was retained. To strengthen the bottom end, the timing side main bearing was changed from a plain bush to a ball bearing, and the drive side main bearing was changed from a ball to a roller bearing. The cast iron barrel of the B40 was changed to an alloy item for the 441. Compression ratio of the GP model was 11.4:1, and was reduced to 9.5:1 on the Enduro by means of a plate below the barrel.

In 1967, the Victor Roadster was introduced, which had a square-finned barrel and head and a compression ration of 9.4:1. The Enduro version was fitted with this configuration in 1968. Power output was 34 bhp (25 kW) for the GP models and 28–30 bhp (21–22 kW)) for the other models.

The GP featured a frame derived from the works racers, other models used a frame developed from the C15 Trials bikes.

== Models ==
=== B44 Victor GP ===
On the strength of Jeff Smith's two World Championship victories, BSA introduced a race replica at the 1965 Earls Court Motorcycle Show, the B44 Victor GP.

The model was discontinued in 1967, around 500 GPs being produced in total.

=== B44VE Victor Enduro/B44VS Victor Special ===
A road legal on-off-road version with lights was introduced in 1966 as the B44VE Victor Enduro in the UK and the B44VS Victor Special in the US. From 1967 the Victor Special name was used in all markets. The fuel and oil tanks were made in alloy. Production continued until the model was replaced by the B50 Victor Trail in 1971.

=== B44VR Victor Roadster/B44SS Shooting Star ===
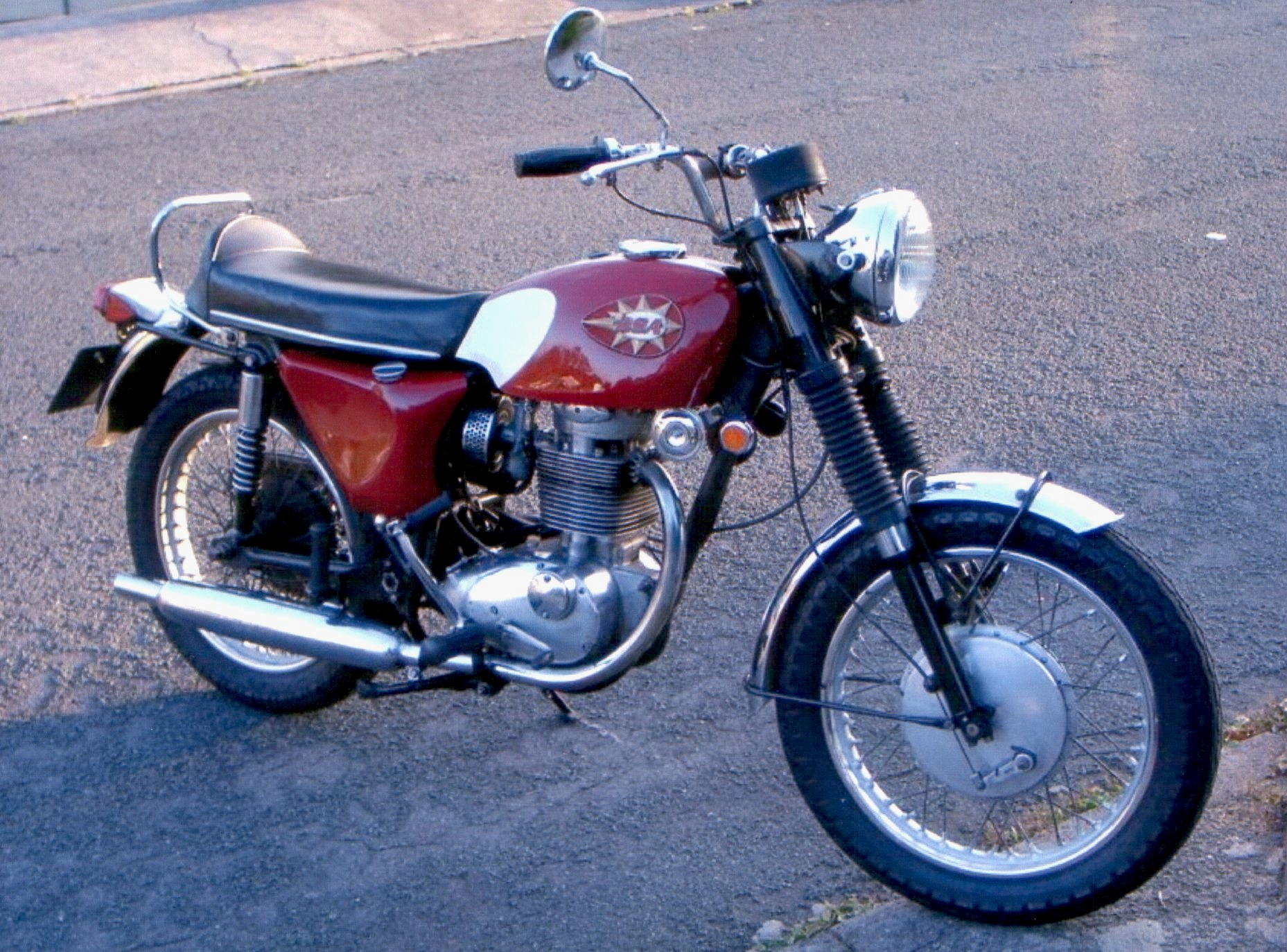
1968 B44SS Shooting Star

A roadster version, designated B44VR Victor Roadster in the UK and B44SS Shooting Star in the US, was introduced in 1967. The model used fibreglass fuel and oil tanks and was fitted with a 7″ half-width front brake. From 1968 the model was known as the Shooting Star in all markets, the tanks were changed to steel, and a larger 8" front brake was fitted. A 7" full width twin leading shoe front brake was fitted from 1969. The model was discontinued when the 500 cc B50 models were introduced in 1971.

== Bibliography ==
- Henshaw, Peter (2015). BSA 350, 441 & 500 Singles: Unit Construction Singles C15, B25, C25, B40, B44 & B50 1958-1973. Veloce Publishing Ltd. ISBN 9781845847562.
- Wright, Owen (1992). BSA: The Complete Story. Crowood Press. ISBN 9781852237028.
