= BSA B25 =

Series of motorcycles made by the Birmingham Small Arms Company

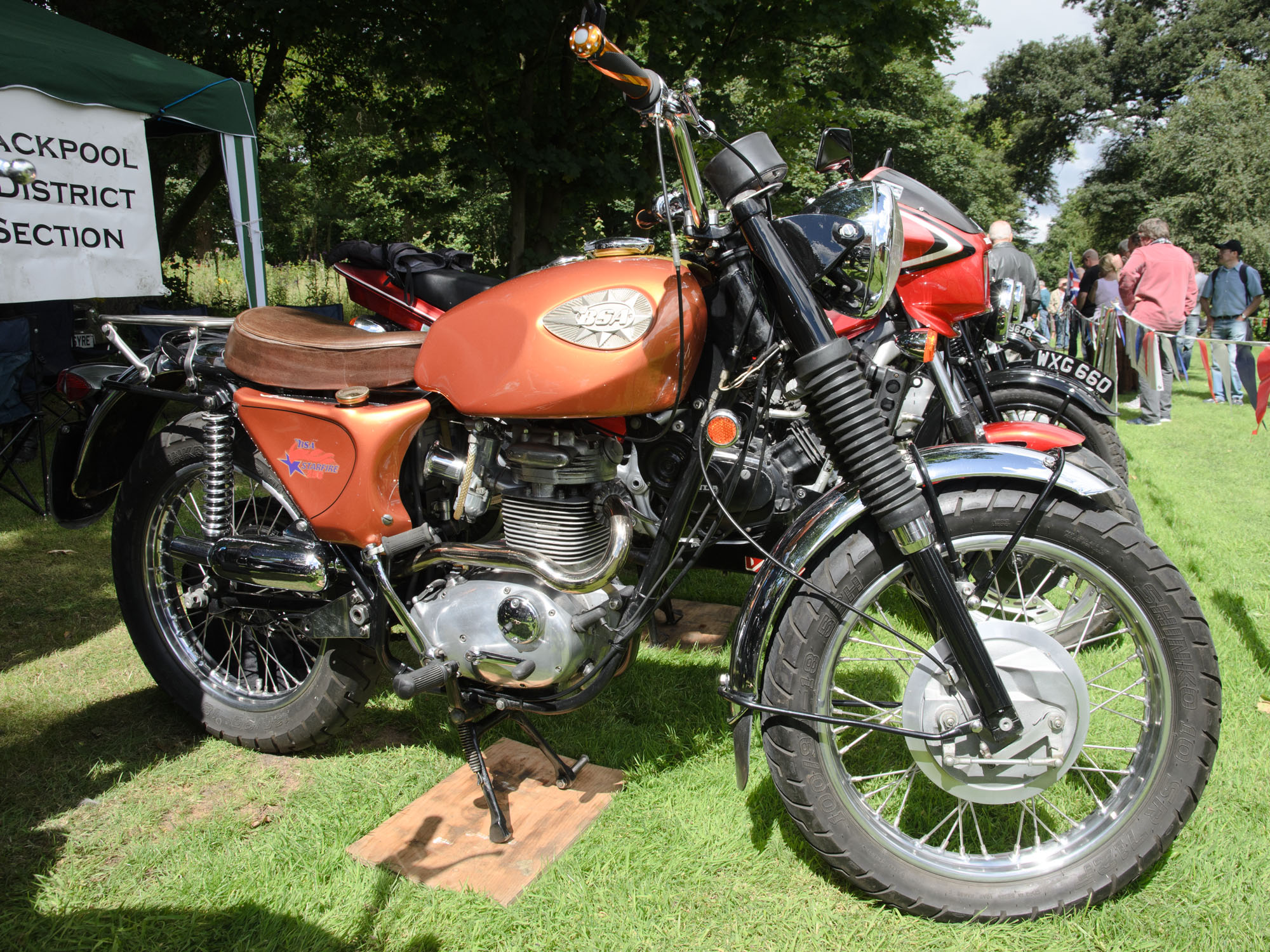
- 1969 BSA Starfire
- Manufacturer: BSA motorcycles
- Parent company: Birmingham Small Arms Company Limited
- Production: 1967–1971
- Assembly: Small Heath, Birmingham, UK
- Predecessor: BSA C15
- Engine: 247 cc (15.1 cu in), air-cooled, unit construction, OHV, four-stroke, single
- Bore / stroke: 67 mm × 70 mm (2.6 in × 2.8 in)
- Compression ratio: 10:1
- Power: 26 bhp (19 kW) at 7250 rpm
- Transmission: Wet, multi-plate clutch, 4-speed gearbox, chain drive
- Frame type: Single cradle
- Suspension: Front: telescopic forks Rear: swinging arm
- Brakes: Drum brakes front & rear

The BSA B25 was a series of 250 cc (15 cu in) unit construction single-cylinder OHV four-stroke motorcycles made by the Birmingham Small Arms Company. Developed from the BSA C15, the machines were produced between 1967 and 1971. The B25 was the fastest British production 250.

== Technical details ==
The 247 cc engine was a higher performance development of that used the existing C15. Bore and stroke of 67 x 70 mm was retained, but a new alloy barrel and cylinder head were introduced featuring square fins. The pushrod tunnel was cast into the barrel rather than being a separate item as on earlier models. Tappet adjustment was by eccentric rocker shaft.

To improve performance the inlet tract was opened up and bigger valves fitted along with the newly introduced Amal Concentric carburettor. Compression ratio was increased to 10:1 and a sports camshaft used. Power output was 26 bhp (19 kW) at 7250 rpm, (later reduced to 22.5 bhp (16.8 kW) on the P34 models) The engine was free-revving and would rev to over 8,000 rpm.

Unlike the later C15s, which used a roller bearing big end, the B25 reverted to a plain big end and split conrod. The model gained a reputation for unreliability due to big end and conrod failures. BSA attempted to address this in the P34 models by fitting a conrod with a larger shoulder. The oil pump was also changed to a cast iron body design, the earlier zinc alloy bodies tending to distort and reduce oil pressure. An inline paper oil filter was also added to improve oil quality.

A duplex chain took power to a wet, multi-plate clutch. The gearbox had 4 speeds and final drive was by chain.

Developed from the competition C15s, the all-welded frame had a single downtube that split into two to form a cradle under the engine. The later P34 used a frame where the oil was stored in the top spine, this frame was shared with the B50 models.

Electrics were upgraded to 12v (the C15 used a 6v system). The output from the alternator was regulated by a zener diode with a large heat sink mounted between the front forks.

== B25 Starfire/C25 Barracuda ==
The first model of the series was introduced in 1967 as the C25 Barracuda in the UK and the B25 Starfire in the USA (although the US models had frame and engine numbers prefixed C25). The model was a more sporty replacement for the C15 and, in the UK, aimed at learner riders.

Sharing many cycle parts with the 441 cc B44 Victor Roadster, the model had a 2 US gallons (1.7 imp gal) fibre glass tank and a seat with a rear hump. Front forks were two-way damped and rubber gaiters fitted instead of the metal covers of the C15 and at the rear the springs of the shock absorbers were now exposed. Chrome mudguards and a chrome headlight shell was fitted. Single-sided 7 inches (180 mm) drum brakes were fitted front and rear.

1968

The B25 Starfire designation was adopted for all markets (Frame and engine numbers being prefixed B25B). The machine gained a full-width 7" front brake, and larger petrol tanks fitted; 2.5 US gallons (2.1 imp gal) on the US version and a steel 3.4 imperial gallons (4.1 US gal) on the UK version.

1969

In common with other machines in the BSA/Triumph range, a new 7" twin leading shoe front brake was fitted. Minor cosmetic changes included rubber knee pads on the tank and a chrome passenger grab-rail. The US model was given a high-level exhaust and the cylinder and cylinder head finished in black. Engine and frame numbers were prefixed B25S.

== B25FS Fleetstar ==
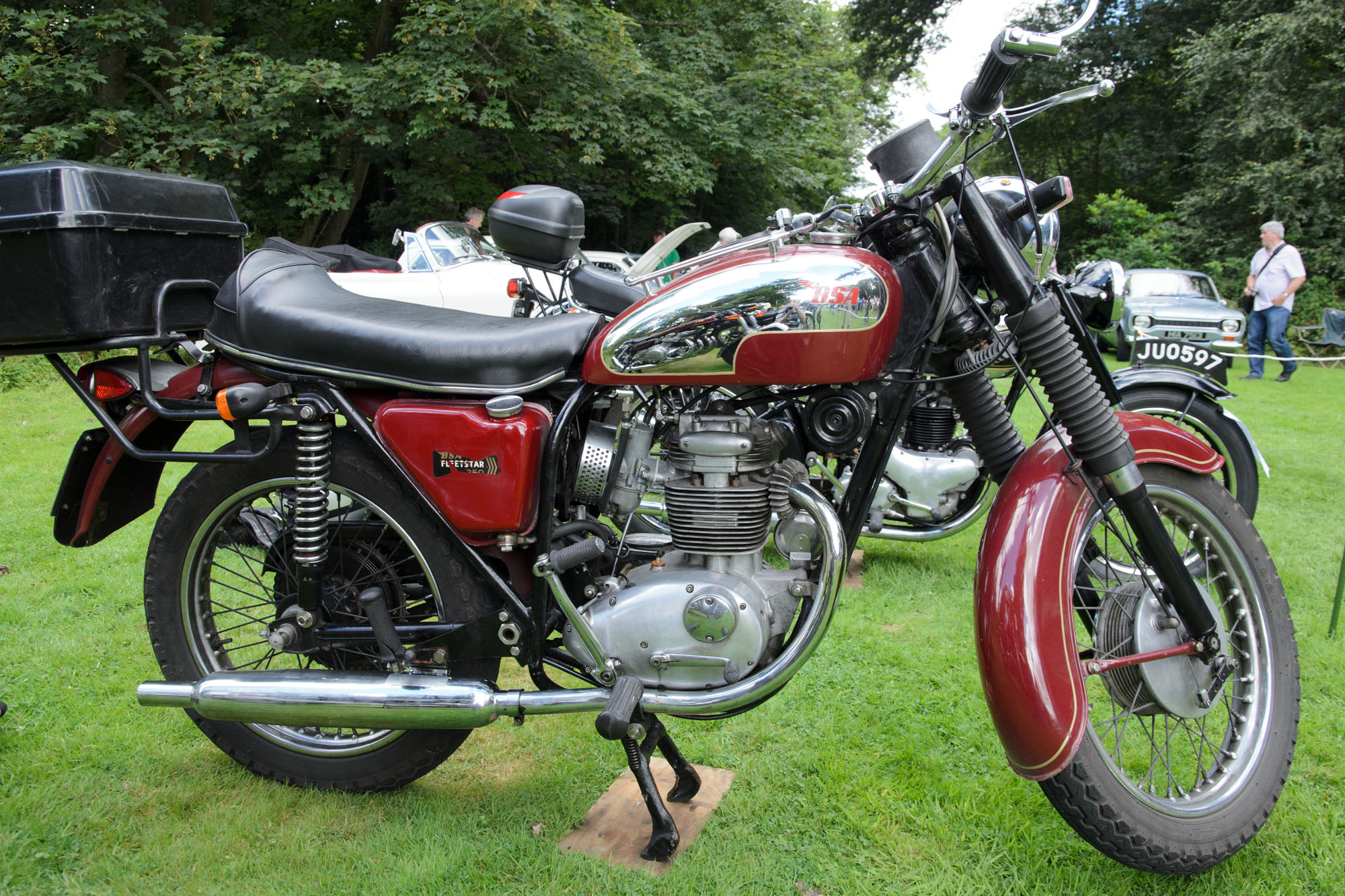
1968 BSA Fleetstar

A less sporty version, the B25FS Fleetstar, was introduced in 1969 to appeal to fleet customers such as the police. The compression ratio was reduced to 8.5:1, which dropped power output down to 21 bhp (16 kW). The machine had painted, valance mudguards and a more conventional steel tank. Various accessories such as fairings, leg-guards and panniers could be fitted dependent on the purchaser's requirements.

The machine was updated with the oil bearing frame in 1971, but unlike the other B25 models retained its roadster styling. Around 449 Fleetstars were manufactured, about 250 of these being sold to the police.

== B25 Woodsman ==
The B25 Woodsman variant with a high-level exhaust was produced alongside the standard model for non-US markets (the US model having a high level exhaust). The model was soon withdrawn and only about 10 machines were made.

== P34 (oil-in-frame) models ==
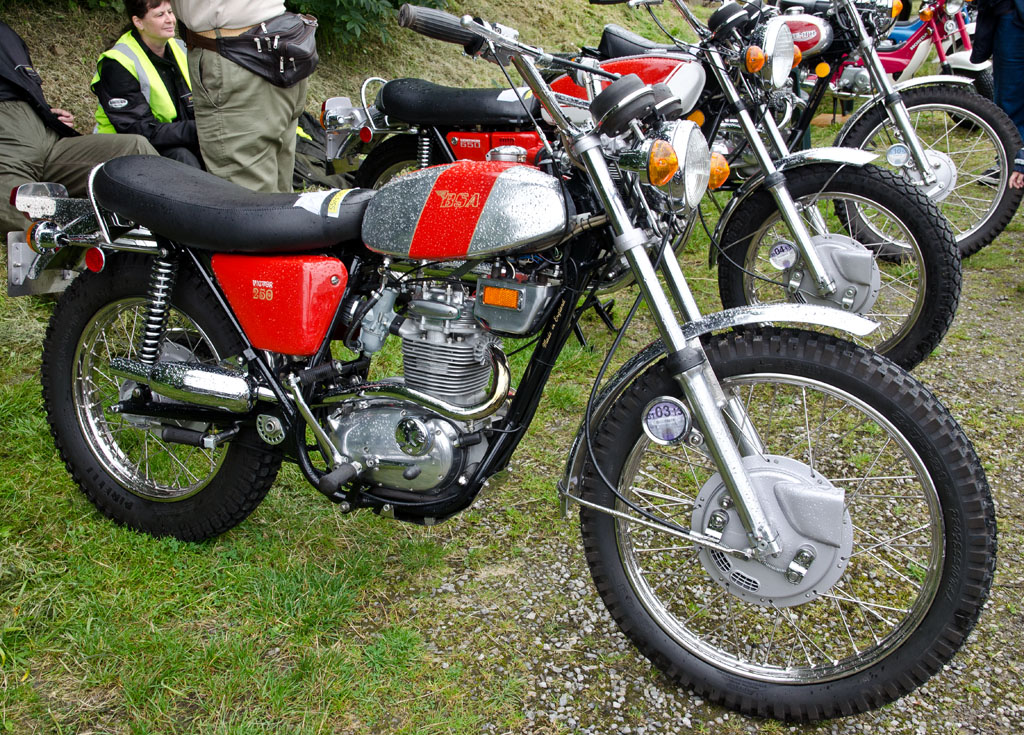
1971 BSA Victor Trail 250

Since the late 1960s, BSA engineers had been working on a revamp of the existing range and development of new models. In October 1970, the new range, collectively known as The Power Set, was released. The revamp was divided into individual projects. The singles project, which consisted of the 250 cc B25 and a new 500 cc B50, was code-named P34.

The engine received some upgrades. Failures of the conrod was addressed by redesigning the conrod with a larger shoulder section. This required the crankshaft to be machined to clear the thicker conrod. Being a plain bearing, the big end requires a good flow of oil. A new cast iron bodied oil pump was fitted, the previous zinc alloy bodied pump was prone to warping leading to reduction in oil pressure. A new full-flow paper oil filter was also fitted. These modifications were intended to reduce the tendency for the big end to fail. Power output was reduced to 22.5 bhp (16.8 kW).

The mating surfaces between the barrel and cylinder head were made larger and a new head gasket designed. Rocker box mounting studs were increased in size. A thrust washer was placed between the clutch chain-wheel and its mounting to reduce wear problems. A redesigned clutch hub allowed an extra plate to be fitted. The rear engine mounting lug was increased to 75 mm for consistency with the 500 engine.

The all-new cycle parts were shared with the B50, and many of the components were common to the complete BSA/Triumph range. The frame, which held the oil in the top tube, was developed from the competition machines. A new high-level lozenge shaped box silencer was fitted, which was designed to meet possible future more stringent noise laws. Common to the rest of the BSA/Triumph range were the Ceriani type forks and conical wheel hubs. The hubs were 7" rear and either 6" sls or 8" tls front.

These models were only in production for a year. The financial situation of the BSA Group forced a great reduction in the model range for 1972 and the 250s were discontinued.

=== B25SS Gold Star 250 ===
The B25SS Gold Star 250 was marketed as an on or off-road machine. The UK versions had the 8" tls front brake and a longer front mudguard to accommodate a front number plate, which was required by UK at this time. The US version had the 6" sls front brake and a 6" shorter front mudguard. Both variants had a steel 2 imperial gallons (2.4 US gal) petrol tank with a twist-off filler cap. The machine was fitted with 18" wheels.

=== B25T Victor Trail 250 ===
Marketed as an off-road machine, the B25T Victor Trail 250 used most of the components of the 250 Gold Star. The most significant changes were an alloy petrol tank, front mudguard mounted on the bottom fork yoke, a 20" front wheel and off-road tyres, the rear being a larger 400 section. The 6" sls front brake was used on both the UK and US variants.

== Triumph variants ==
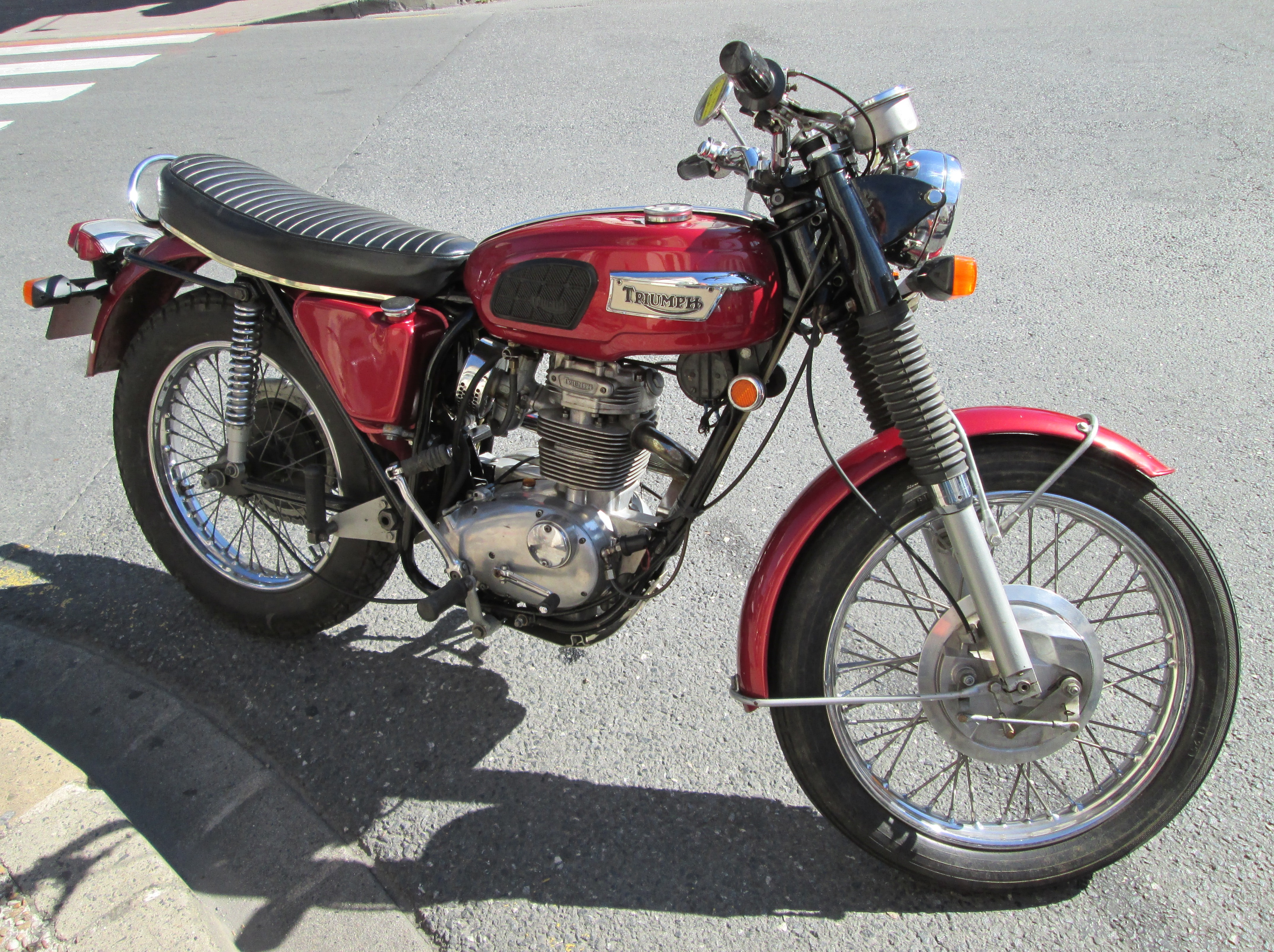
1970 Triumph TR25W Trophy

=== TR25W Trophy ===
Triumph Engineering had been bought by BSA in 1951 but had retained its own identity and had a separate model range. As a replacement for the ageing Triumph Tiger Cub, the TR25W Trophy was introduced in 1968. (The "W" in the model designation stood for "woodsman") The machine shared the chassis of the Starfire, but used 19" wheels front and rear, with a steel Triumph tank and side panels, high bars and a high level exhaust on the right hand side. The TR25W was built at BSA's Small Heath factory.

A steel fuel tank was used for all years and in 1969 and the machine also received the 7" tls brake. The exhaust was moved to the left side for 1970.

=== T25T Trail Blazer ===
The T25T Trail Blazer was virtually identical to the BSA Victor Trail 250 apart from paint finishes and badges.

=== T25SS Trail Blazer SS ===
The T25SS Trail Blazer SS was also known as the Blazer SS. It had a slightly different tank to the BSA Gold Star 250, but otherwise was the same except for paint finishes and badge. A 3 imperial gallons (3.6 US gal) tank was available, which because of its extra length required a shorter dualseat to be fitted.
