= BSA W33-7 =

- Manufacturer: BSA
- Production: 1933
- Engine: 499cc four stroke single
- Transmission: Four speed gearbox to rear chain
- Wheelbase: 54 in (1,400 mm)
- Seat height: 27 in (690 mm)

The BSA W33-7 was a British motorcycle made by BSA at their factory in Small Heath, Birmingham in 1933.

== Development ==
The BSA W33-7 was a 499cc 4.99 hp over head valve single cylinder four stroke. The full duplex cradle frame had fixings for a sidecar fitted as standard. The fuel tank was chrome plated with green side panels. The 6 volt electrical switches and ammeter were mounted in the middle of the top of the fuel tank. Only produced in 1933 it was replaced by the BSA W33-8 BSA Blue Star in the same year.
