= BSA B21 =

BSA motorcycle produced 1937–1939

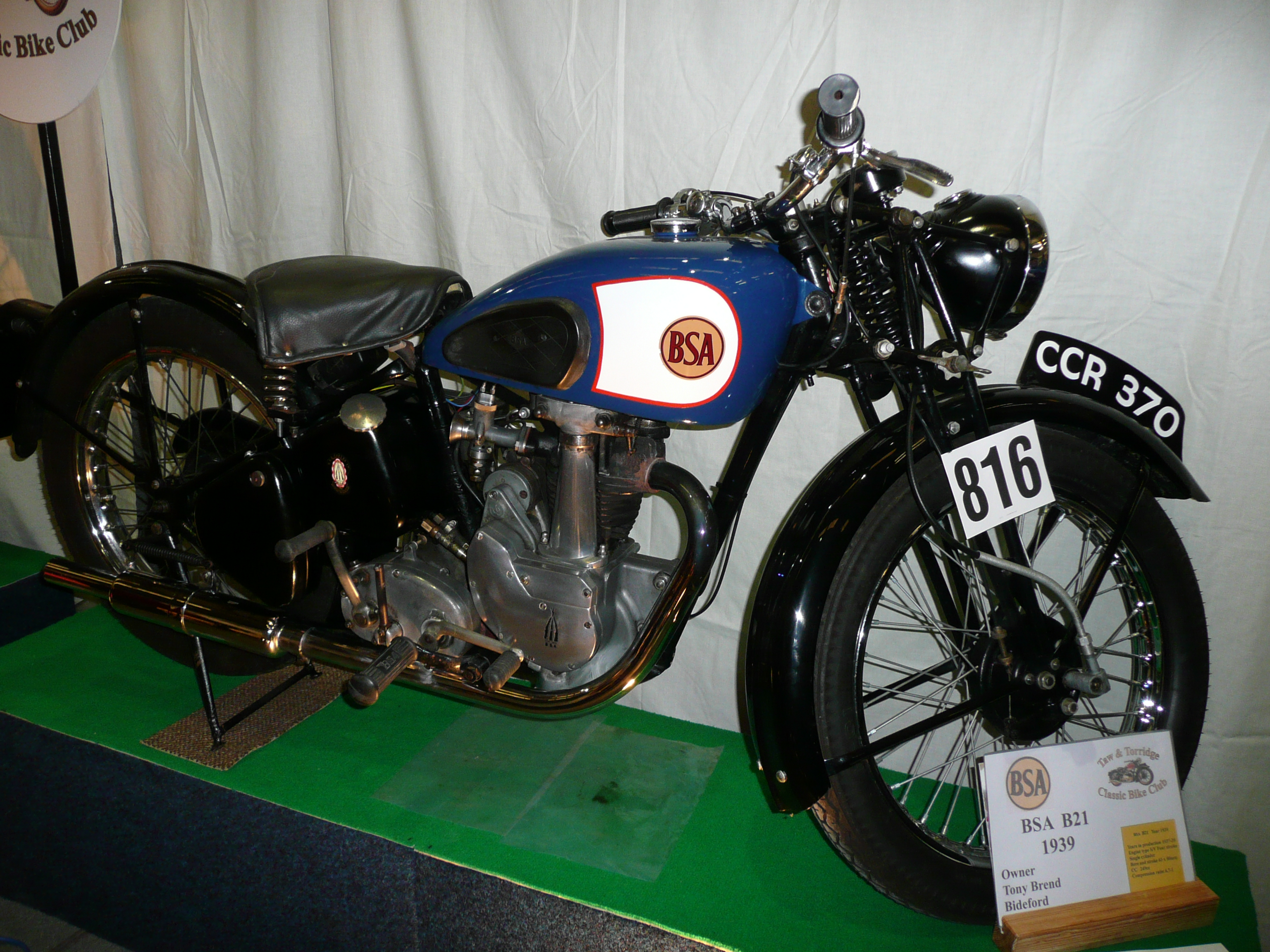
- 1939 BSA B21
- Manufacturer: Birmingham Small Arms Company
- Production: 1937–1939
- Engine: 249 cc single-cylinder OHV four-stroke
- Transmission: 4-speed, chain
- Fuel capacity: 3 imp gal (14 L)
- Related: BSA M23 Empire Star

The BSA B21 was a British motorcycle made by Birmingham Small Arms Company (BSA) at their factory in Small Heath, Birmingham. Production started in 1937 and ended with the outbreak of World War II in 1939.

== Development ==
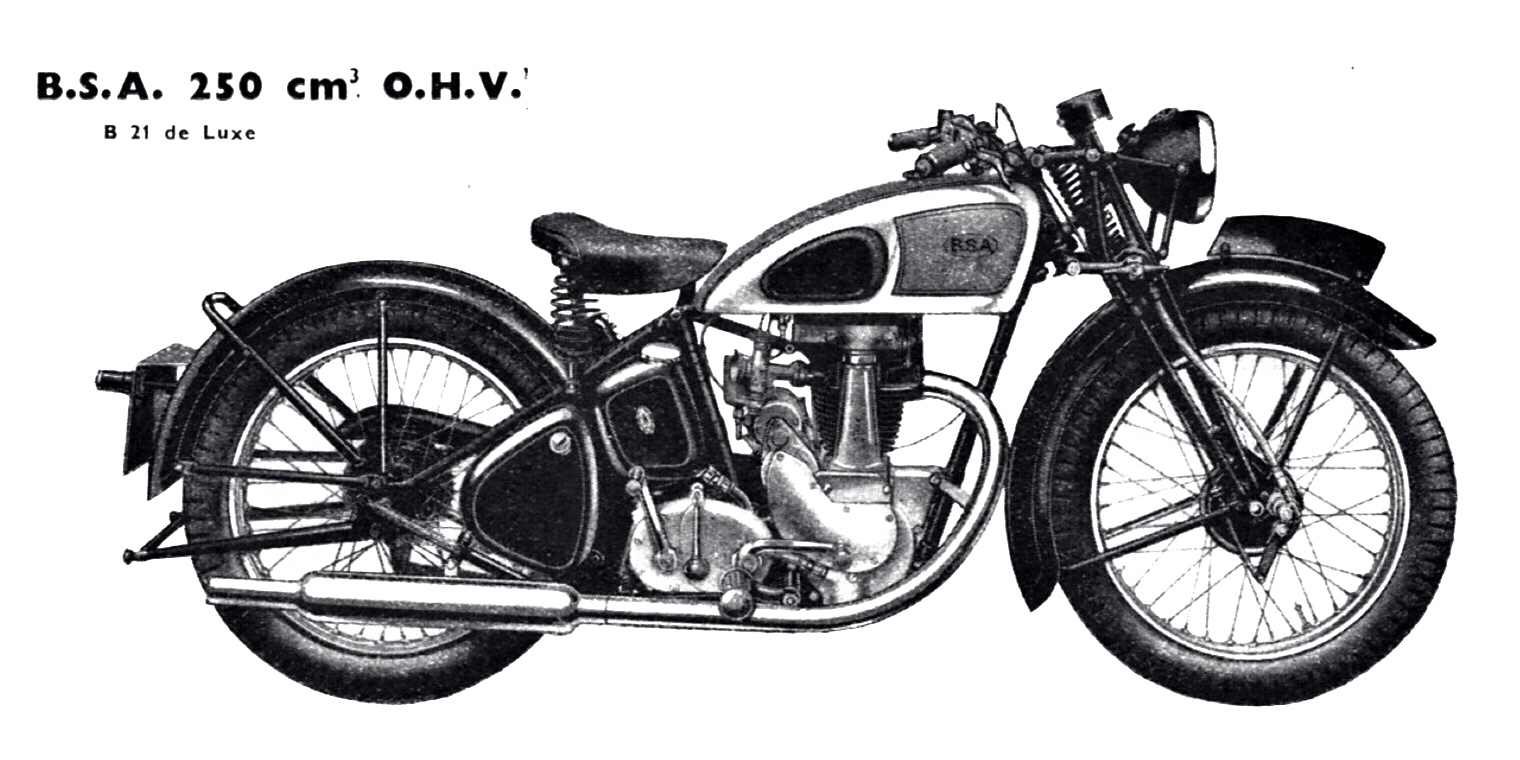
BSA B21 de luxe (1939).

During the depression of the 1930s, BSA rationalised its model range. In 1937 BSA B21 introduced a new series of models designed by Val Page. The B21 was the 250 cc overhead valve model in this range, which also included the M23 Empire Star in 500 cc form.

The B21 used a single-cylinder OHV engine with magneto ignition, an Amal carburettor and a four-speed hand-change gearbox. Front suspension was by spring-loaded girder forks the rear was unsprung, with rider comfort provided by a sprung saddle.

When the Second World War began, BSA's production switched to military contracts. The BSA M20, a 500 cc side-valve model, was adopted as a military motorcycle, and the B21 was discontinued.

== See also ==
- List of BSA motorcycles
- Val Page
- BSA M20
