= BSA C15 =

British, 250 cc single cylinder motorcycle, produced by BSA in the 1960s

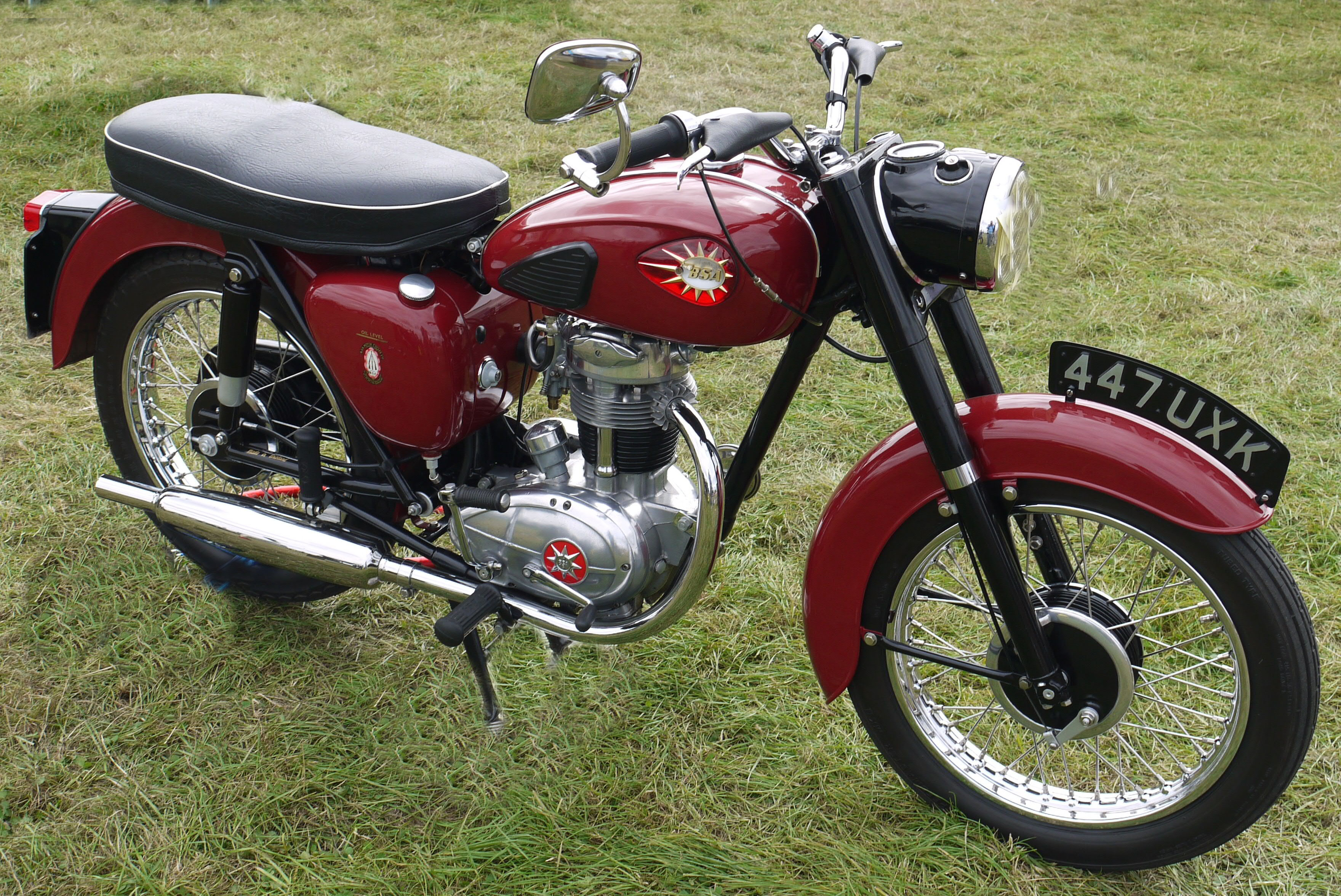
- Manufacturer: BSA Motorcycles Ltd., Armoury Road, Small Heath, Birmingham, England
- Also called: Star
- Parent company: Birmingham Small Arms Company
- Production: 1958–1967
- Predecessor: BSA C12
- Successor: BSA B25 Starfire, BSA C25 Barracuda
- Engine: 4-stroke 249 cc (15.2 cu in) OHV single cylinder, alloy head, Amal 375 carburettor
- Bore / stroke: 67 mm × 70 mm (2.6 in × 2.8 in)
- Power: 15 bhp (11 kW) @7000rpm
- Ignition type: Coil with 60 watt Lucas RM13 alternator
- Transmission: Four-speed, chain drive
- Brakes: 6 inches (15 cm) front and rear with full width hubs
- Tyres: 3.25 × 17″ front and rear
- Wheelbase: 51.25 inches (130.2 cm)
- Weight: 280 lb (130 kg) (dry)
- Fuel capacity: 3 gallons

The BSA C15 was a 250 cc single-cylinder ohv motorcycle manufactured by the British company BSA from September 1958 until 1967, and was BSA's first four-stroke unit-construction bike. For most of that period, after the introduction of 'Learner Laws' in 1961, a 250 cc was the largest capacity solo machine that a learner could ride unaccompanied when displaying L-plates in the United Kingdom. A road-going Sports derivative was added in 1961, and off-road versions, for Trials and Scrambles, were also available in the range.

Producing only 15 bhp (11 kW), the C15's lack of power meant that it was hard for the BSA to compete with the more sophisticated Japanese motorcycles (such as the Honda C71 and CB72) which began arriving in the UK in the 1960s.

== Development ==
BSA acquired the Triumph marque in 1951, and the BSA C15 250 cc four stroke was derived from the 200 cc Triumph Tiger Cub, itself coming from the 150cc Terrier. Edward Turner became head of the BSA automotive division and in 1958 BSA introduced the concept of unit construction, where the engine and gearbox were combined in one piece rather than as separate components. The BSA C15 'Star' was the first unit construction model and proved more reliable and economical than its predecessor, the pre-unit BSA C11.

The C11 engine had an iron barrel and alloy head with overhead valves operated by pushrods which ran in a separate tube to fully enclosed rockers. The camshaft was geared directly from the crankshaft with skew gears driving the oil pump and the contact breaker assembly mounted behind the cylinder via a shaft. The alternator was to the left and the primary drive was via a duplex chain to a multi plate clutch. The four speed gearbox was at the rear of the vertically split crankcase. The frame was single loop with twin rails under the engine and pivoted fork rear suspension, and both wheels were 17 inch with full width cast iron hubs. An oil tank was under the seat on the right matched by a toolbox on the left. Between them was an ignition switch panel hiding the battery. The headlamp was fitted in a nacelle which also housed the instruments and switches as was fashionable at the time. Deeply valanced mudguards were fitted to the standard model, making it look heavier than it actually was.

A successor to the C11, the C15 had a completely redesigned frame and 250 cc engine. The bike proved to need careful maintenance, being prone to oil leaks, electrical faults, gearbox problems, valve-gear failures, a weak big-end, and clutch adjustment problems. Initially, the contact breaker housing protruded at the rear of the cylinder above the gearbox, but was later relocated to the right-side crankcase, accessed via a circular plate.

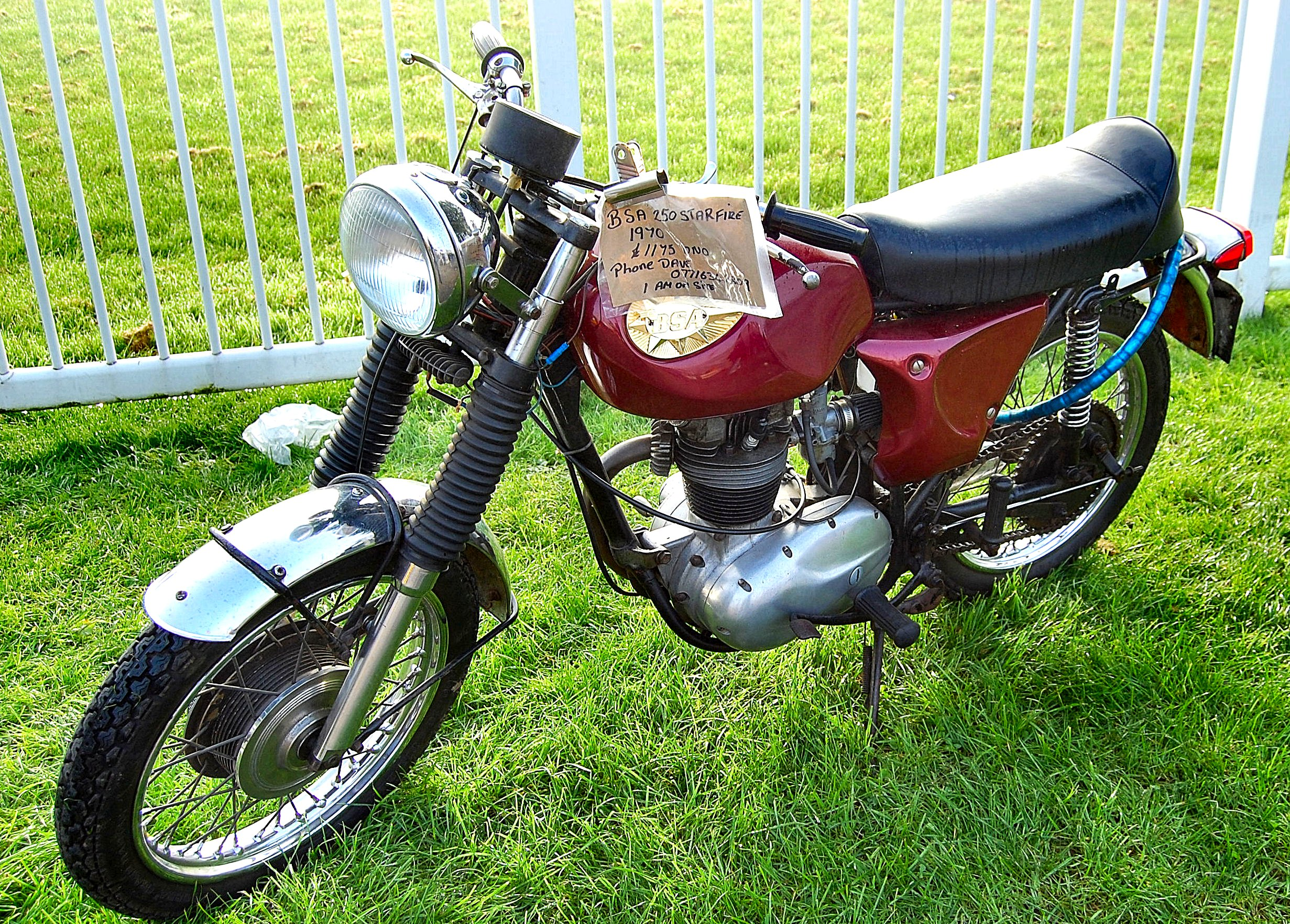
BSA Starfire

BSA developed an increased capacity 441 cc model, marketed as the BSA B44 Shooting Star and the BSA Victor Special. Following development work in producing Jeff Smith's works B40-based Victor, from 1966 onwards the C15 bottom-end (crankcases, bearings, oil pump with circulation system and gearbox components) was similarly upgraded.

In 1967 the 250 cc C15 was succeeded by the BSA B25 'Starfire' and BSA C25 'Barracuda' models, which had a quickly detachable rear wheel and 12 volt electrics.

== Models ==
=== BSA C15 Star ===
The 1959 C15 Star was the first model in the range.

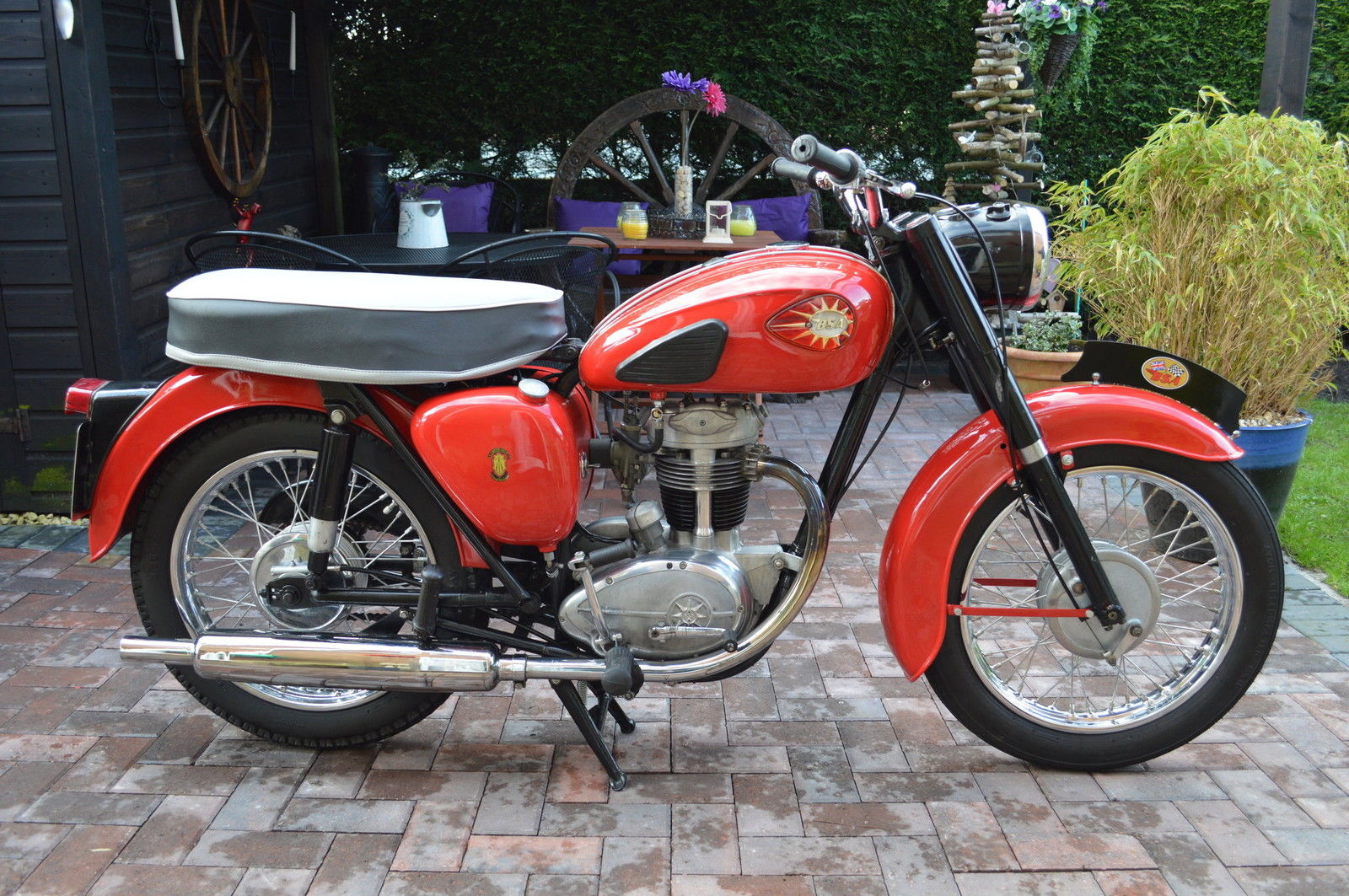
1959 BSA C15 Star - right side

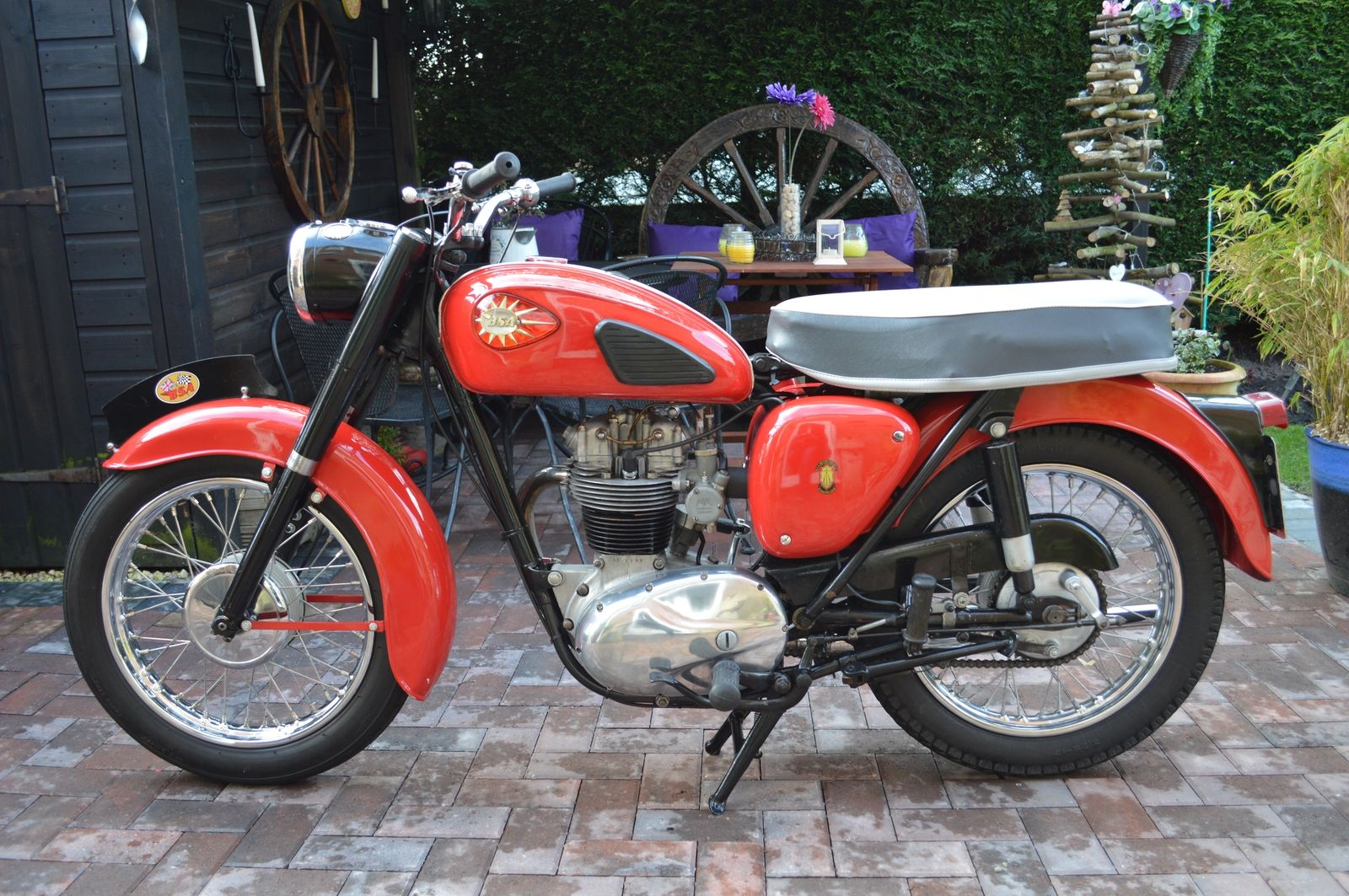
1959 BSA C15 Star - left side

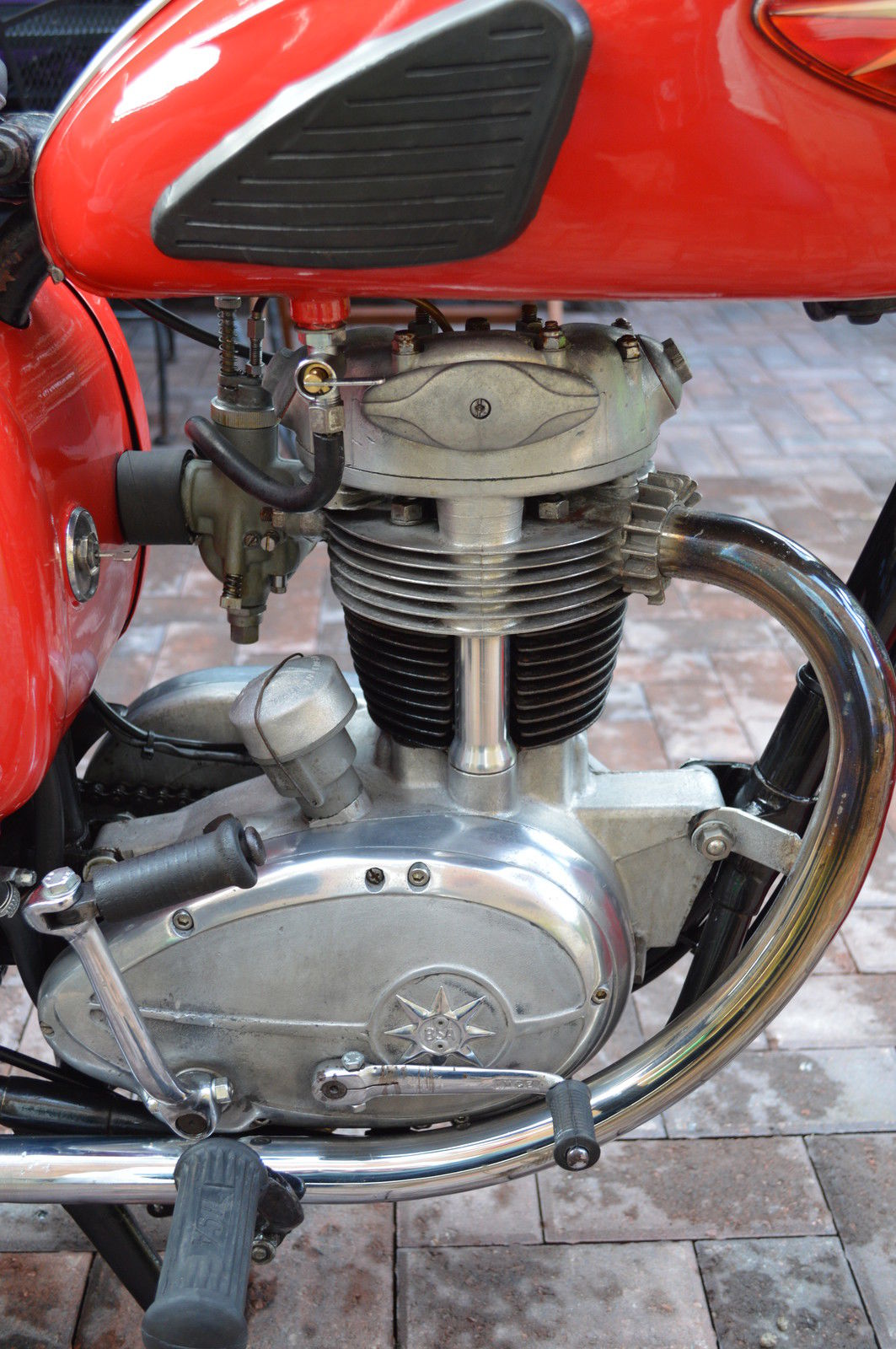
1959 BSA C15 Star - engine

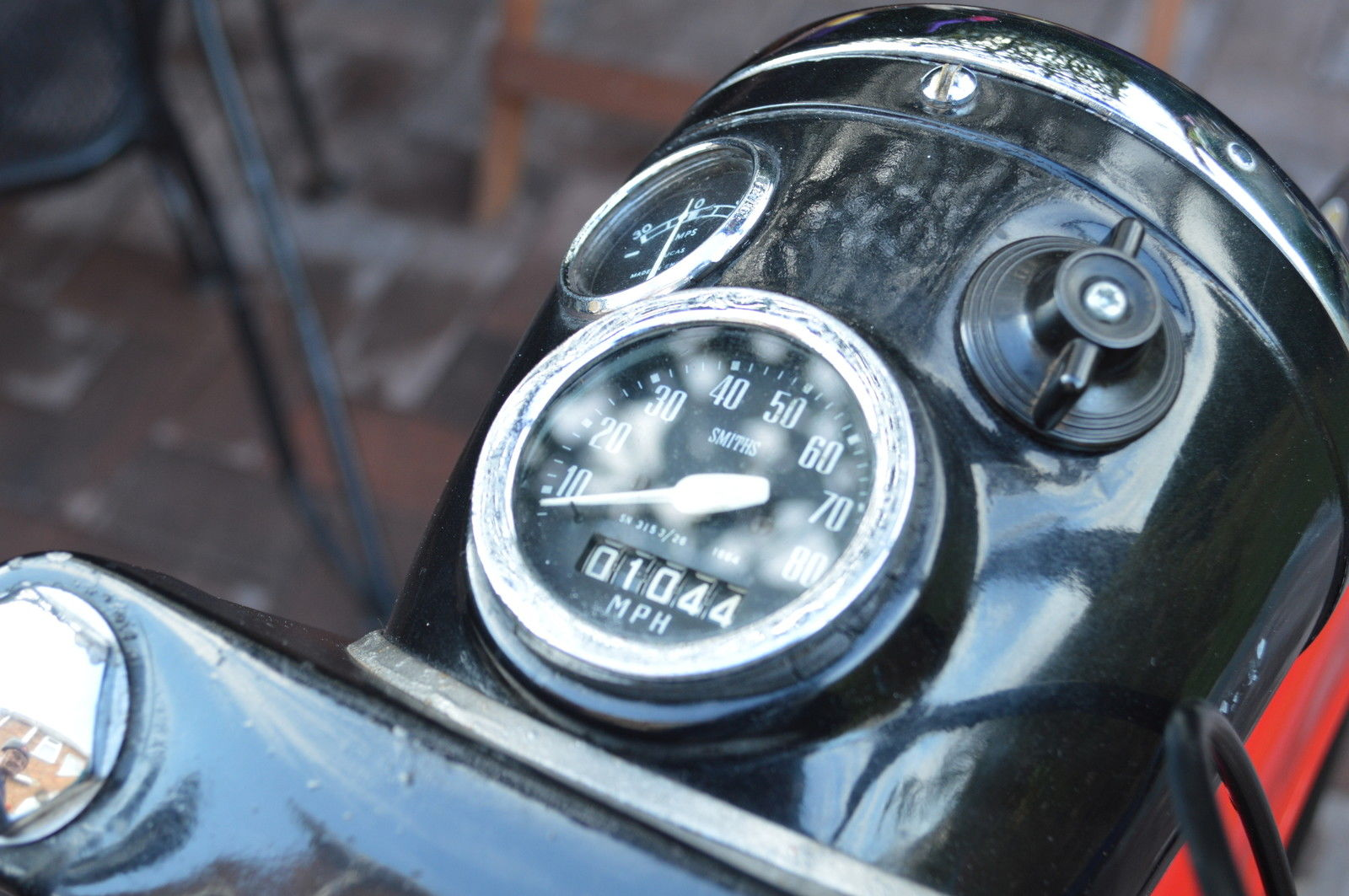
1959 BSA C15 Star - clocks

=== BSA C15 'Sportsman' (SS80) ===
In 1961 the 'Super Sports' model (SS80) or C15 Sportsman joined the range, with a tuned engine, roller big-ends and lower handlebars. A faster 350 cc version, the SS90 based on the BSA B40 was also added to the range but was not a big seller to the general public – as it was too big for learners and too small for those who had passed their motorcycle test - but the B40 was ideal for military use including use with the British Armed Forces.

=== BSA C15G ===
The BSA C15G was produced from 1966 to 1967 and was the last version of the C15 engine with the ball bearing timing side main bearing, roller drive side and strengthened crankcases, larger oil pump and needle roller gearbox layshaft bearings.

=== BSA C15T ===
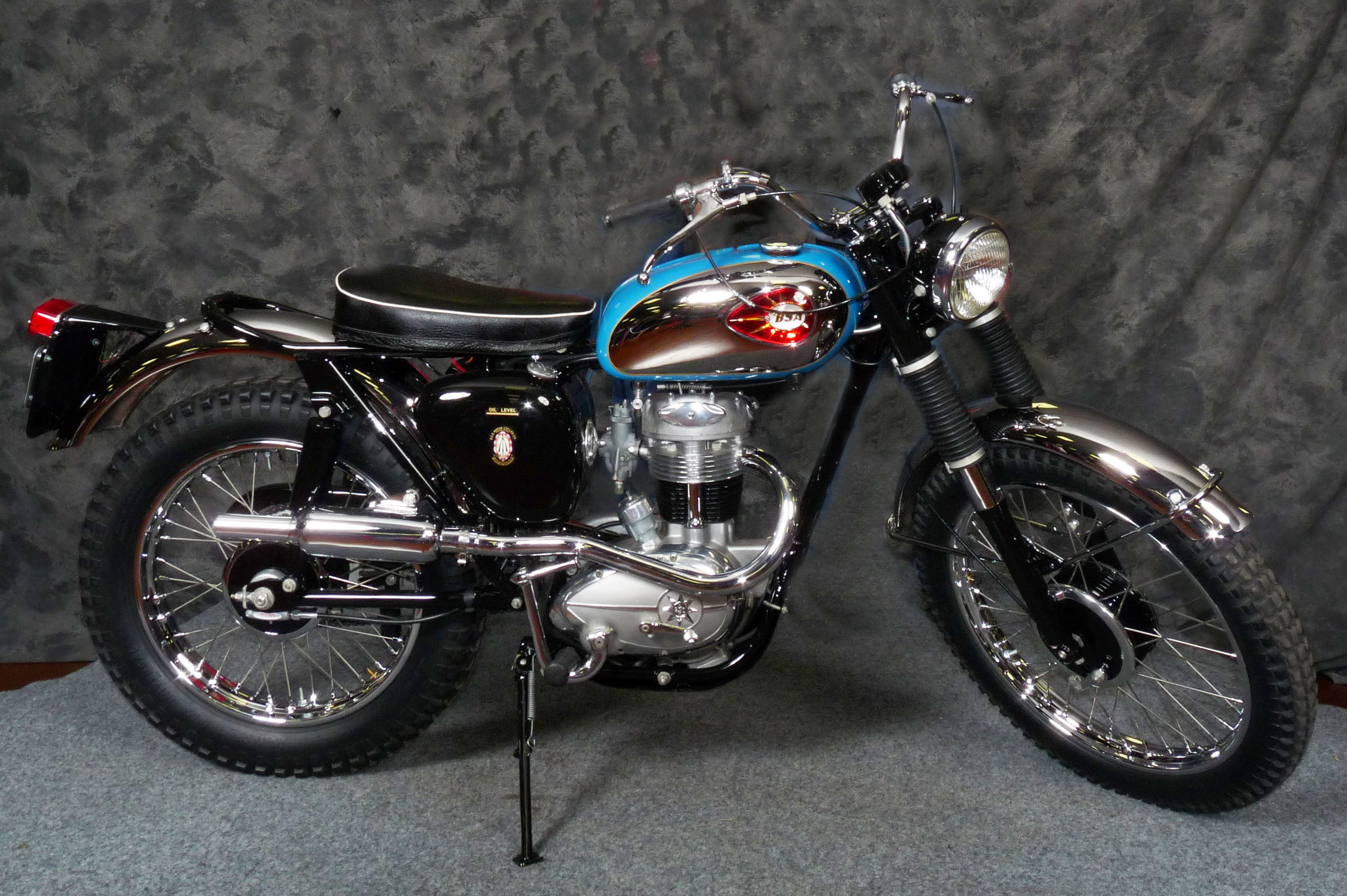
Trials C15

The BSA C15T was a trials version with a higher clearance frame fitted with a reinforced plate, special gear ratios suited to off-road use, a 20" front wheel in the UK and a high level exhaust pipe. A special tank and optional lighting allowed it to be converted for legal road use. Still with an iron barrel and alloy head, the engine had a special camshaft to lower the tune for off-road trials use (for more "plonk"). The first series competition frame with single down tube suffered rear tyre clearance problems in heavy mud. This was largely resolved in the later twin down-tube competition frame with its wider swing arm. The C15T proved to be competitive at club and national levels, and it remained unchanged in the BSA range until 1965.

=== BSA C15T Trials Cat ===
In 1964 and 1965 the overbored 500 cc BSA C15T 'Trials Cat' ridden by Jeff Smith won the 500 cc World Moto-Cross Championship. This success led to the development of the 441 cc BSA Victor Scrambler.

=== BSA C15S ===
The BSA C15S was the scrambler (motocross) competition version of the 250 cc Star produced between 1959 and 1965. As with the trials model, the C15S saved the weight of a battery through an 'energy transfer' electrical system which was notoriously unreliable. The problem was that the timing and points gap required far too much careful setting for a rugged competition motorcycle. The scrambler C15 shared the same frame as the trials (designated with a C suffix), had a larger exhaust valve, higher compression ratio and modified camshaft for more power. It was unsilenced and had special tyres and strengthened fork springs with rubber fork gaiters to protect the seals.

=== BSA C15 Starfire ===
The BSA C15 Starfire Roadster was produced between 1963 and 1964 with chrome mudguards and tank side panels. Re shaped seat and tank, which gave the bike a more modern appearance.

=== BSA C15P ===
The BSA C15P was a police model produced between 1963 and 1967.

== See also ==
- List of BSA motorcycles
- List of motorcycles of the 1950s
