= BSA Blue Star =

British single-cylinder motorcycle from the 1930s

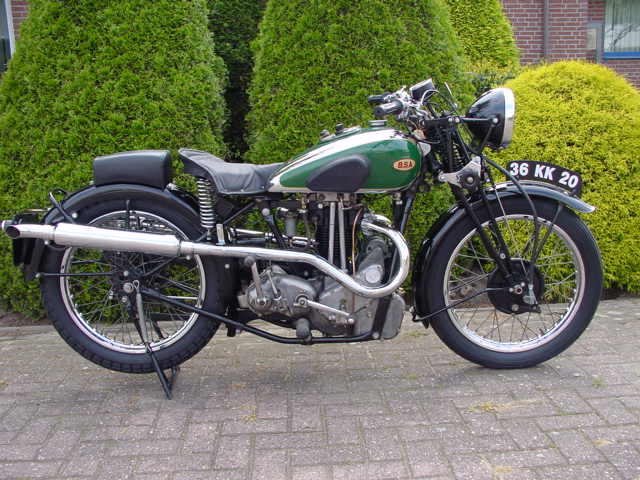
- Manufacturer: BSA
- Production: 1932-1936
- Engine: 249, 349 and 499cc single cylinder 4 stroke
- Power: 28 bhp @ 5,200 rpm
- Transmission: 4 Speed / chain
- Weight: 358 pounds (162 kg) (dry)

The BSA Blue Star is a British motorcycle made by BSA at their factory in Small Heath, Birmingham. The Blue Star range was produced between 1932 and 1936. In 1936 a slightly uprated sports version called the BSA Empire Star was launched with the Blue Star remaining in the model range and called the “New Blue Star, Q21”. The Blue Star became known for its reliability and handling. In 1937 an entirely new engine designed by Val Page featured in the Empire Star and the Blue Star was dropped from the range. The Empire Star developed into the famous Gold Star in 1938 (also known as the M24).

The B33-3 O.H.V. 249cc Blue Star was called the Blue Star Junior and the R33-5 348cc O.H.V. Blue Star was known as the Sporting Blue Star. It was the W33-8 (Q21 in 1936) 499cc O.H.V. that became the most popular, however, and led to the development of the Gold Star. It was known as the "sea beezer" and it was BSAs fifth best seller.
