= BSA B44 Shooting Star =

British single-cylinder motorcycle from the 1960s

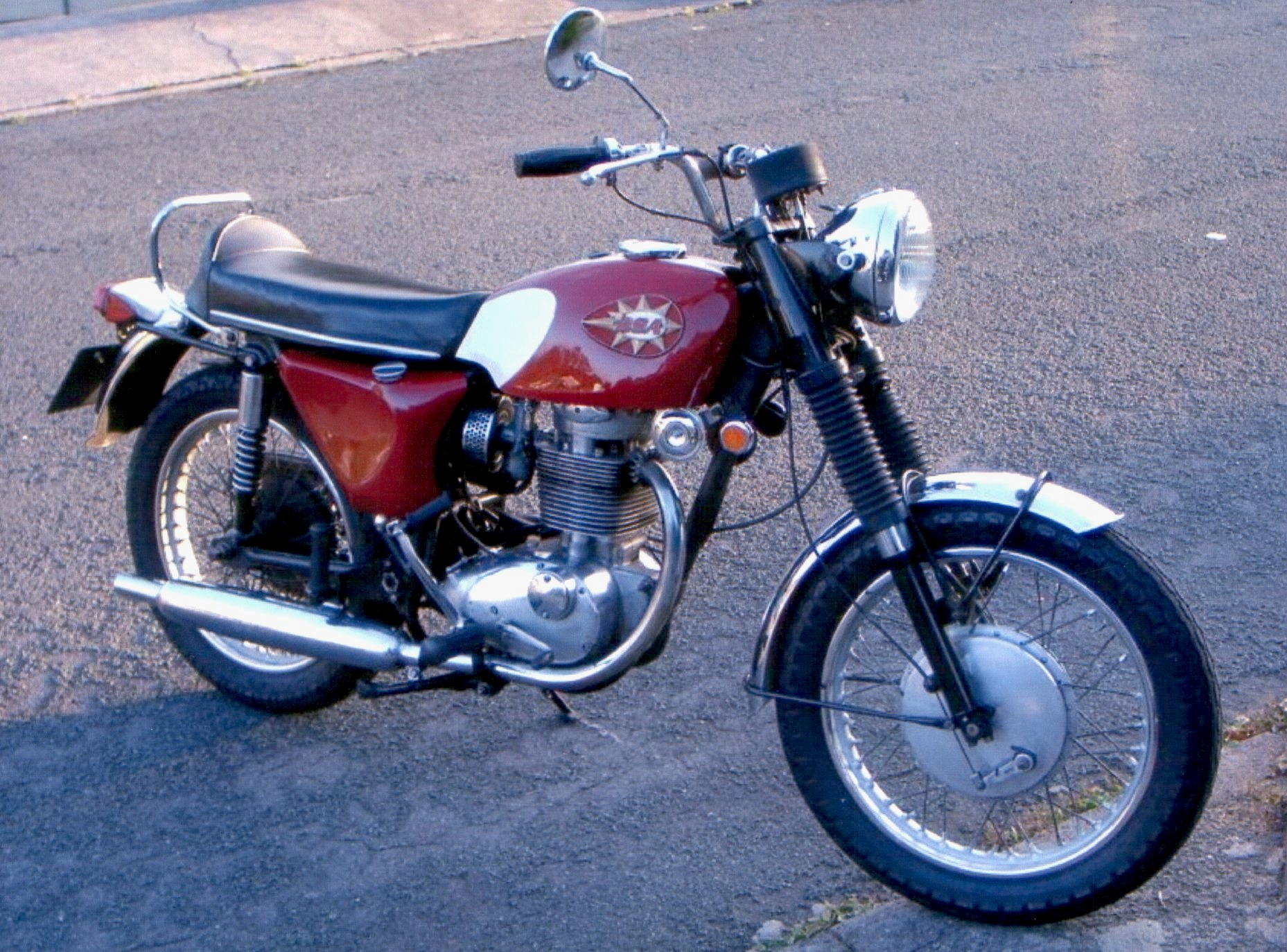
- Manufacturer: BSA
- Also called: Victor Roadster
- Production: 1966–1970
- Engine: 441cc (26.91 cubic inches) Four-stroke, single-cylinder, air-cooled, OHV, 2 valve per cylinder
- Power: 30 hp 21.9 KW @ 6500 rpm
- Transmission: 4 speed/chain
- Wheelbase: 52 inches (53 inches in 1969)
- Dimensions: L: 82 inches (83.2 inches in 1969); W: 28 inches (28.2 inches in 1969)
- Seat height: 31 inches
- Weight: 155.0 kg (341.7 pounds) (dry)
- Fuel capacity: 3.96 gallons (15.00 litres)

The BSA B44 Shooting Star was a motorcycle made by BSA at their factory in Small Heath, Birmingham. Similar to the BSA C15 and sharing many of the same parts, the B44 had an uprated chassis. A weak point of the BSA 250 and most 350 unit singles were the big end bearing and timing side crank bush. The B44 had a double roller big end and a single lipped roller bearing supporting the drive side of the crank, with a ball bearing on the timing side. The timing side ball bearing was prone to failure, so one popular update was to replace it with an NUP305 removable flange roller bearing, thus strengthening the timing side and controlling the crankshaft end float. On the B50 single lip roller bearings were fitted on both sides of the crankshaft, with an outrigger ball bearing on the drive side to provide increased rigidity and end float control.

== History ==
In 1965 an off-road motocross BSA B44 named the ‘’Victor’’ was launched at the Earls Court Show. Developed from scramblers used by Jeff Smith to win the 1964 and 1965 500cc World Championships, followed by the Victor Grand Prix and Victor Enduro models, as well as a road-going version, the 1967 Victor Roadster. The Victor Grand Prix Scrambler had a displacement of 441cc, and the Enduro model was known as the 441 Victor in the United States. BSA began offering a road version, the B44VR Victor Roadster, in 1967. When that model was exported to U.S. dealers in 1968, the name was changed to the B44SS Shooting Star. The B44VS Victor Special was also successfully exported to the US between 1968 and 1970.

In 1968 the B44 became BSA's top export model. The good availability of spare parts and the relative simplicity of the single-cylinder engine meant that the surviving examples are easily restored to as-new condition.

On the original 1969 footage of the Woodstock Concert, producer Michael Lang is seen riding the off-road version, the BSA Victor Special, motorcycle across the pastures.

== Features ==
The Victor Roadster (or Shooting Star, a name borrowed from a 1950s-era BSA twin), had a top speed of around 90 mph (140 km/h) (only a few mph faster than the 250 BSA Barracuda). The Victor Roadster of 1967 had a fibreglass tank and side covers, a 7-inch, half-width front brake, and the square-barrel Victor engine. In 1968, an 8-inch front brake was introduced, and from 1968, US versions came with higher handlebars and reflectors both beneath the tank and on either side of the tail light. In 1969 the Shooting Star was updated with a steel fuel tank and a twin-leading-shoe brake.

Victors had impressive power-to-weight ratios that made them ideal for hill climbs. The 9.4:1 compression ratio required a compression release lever for kick starting.
