= Unit construction =

For the vehicle design where the vehicle's skin is used as a load-bearing element, see Monocoque.

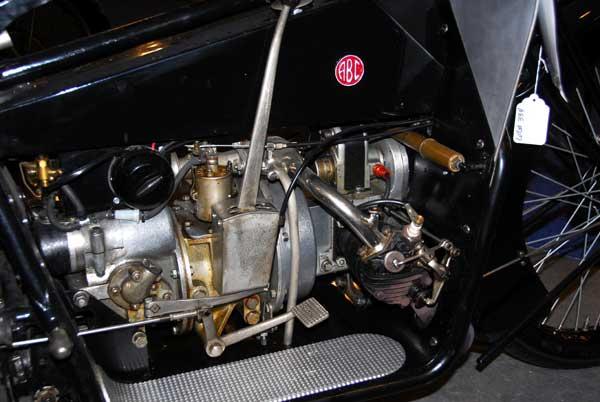
1921 ABC opposed twin unit construction engine / transmission

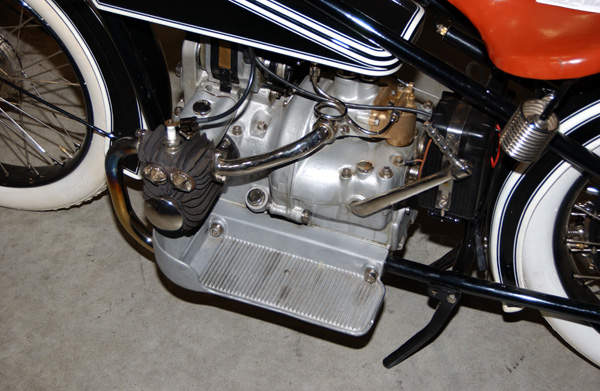
1923 BMW R32 unit construction engine / transmission

Unit construction is the design of larger motorcycles where the engine and gearbox components share a single casing. This sometimes includes the design of automobile engines and was often loosely applied to motorcycles with rather different internal layouts such as the flat twin BMW models.

Prior to the adoption of unit construction, the motorcycle engines and gearboxes typically had separate casings and were connected by a primary chain drive running in an oil-bath chaincase. The unit construction design retained a similar chain drive but continued to use separate oil reservoirs for the engine, gearbox, and primary drive.

Triumph and BSA were already using cast non-ferrous alloy chaincases and started converting to unit construction in the 1950s. A driving factor behind the BSA/Triumph change was that Lucas had declared an intention to abandon production of motorcycle dynamos and magnetos, and instead produce only alternators. By contrast, Velocette, Matchless/AJS, and Norton motorcycles continued to be pre-unit construction (the former machines with pressed-steel primary cases) until the end of production in the 1960s and 1970s respectively. In reality, the casings were not really "unitary," as the crankcase section was vertically divided in the middle and no oil was shared between the three portions. In the 1960s Japanese motorcycles introduced the now-familiar horizontally split clamshell which has become almost universal.

Modern horizontally split four stroke engines invariably use single oil reservoir (whether wet- or dry-sump) but, while this simplifies matters, it is arguable that the previous system of having different types of oil for engine and gearbox is preferable. The BMC Mini was an early example of a car with the "gearbox-in-the-sump;" but this practice of using a single oil reservoir, which has become the norm for motorbikes, is generally undesirable for cars and trucks. Two stroke "total-loss" bikes always have separate oil for the gearbox, as engine oil is burned along with the fuel.

== Advantages and disadvantages ==
The advantages of unit construction are:

- the combined unit contributes to the stiffness of the entire motorcycle.
- unit construction may enable the engine unit to become a stressed member of the frame.
- the primary chaincase can be lighter and more compact.
- the primary chaincase can be shorter, so that wheelbase may also be shorter.
- engine and transmission are now much more accurately aligned to each other in the frame, improving primary drive life.
- the engine is cleaner and fashionably modern in appearance (compared to earlier designs).

A significant disadvantage is that there is no longer any tension adjustment possible of the chain drive between engine and transmission, and tensioning (which is almost certainly still required) must be over a rubber-faced steel slipper. This is quiet and the tensioner does not wear greatly. This change to unit construction meant that it was no longer possible to choose a gearbox from a different manufacturer (e.g. a close-ratio unit for racing) and to send worn gearbox units to be rebuilt.

== History ==
=== Early history ===
Alfred Angas Scott, founder of The Scott Motorcycle Company, designed a motorcycle with unit construction for the engine and gearbox. Production of the motorcycle began in 1908.

In 1911, Singer offered motorcycles with unit-construction 299 cc and 535 cc engines.

In 1914, ABC founder Granville Bradshaw designed a unit-construction horizontally opposed ('flat') twin for Sopwith Aircraft, who, at the time, also made motorcycles.

In 1919, Harley-Davidson introduced the Model W Sport Twin with a unit construction flat-twin.

In 1920 Carlo Guzzi constructed the G.P. 500 prototype with unit-construction. This was followed in 1921by the first Moto Guzzi production model, the "Normale", also a 500cc unit-construction motorcycle.

In 1921, an expanding Bianchi (Italy) showed its first unit-construction side-valve 600 cc V-twin.

In 1923, Rover introduced a 250 cc unit-construction model, followed by a 350 cc in 1924, but production ended in 1925.

In 1923, the advanced three-speed Triumph single-cylinder 346 cc sv unit-construction Model LS appeared, but did not sell well, and ended production in 1927.

In 1923, BMW released its own unit construction shaft drive flat twin of 498 cc. BMW has never built a motorcycle with a separate gearbox.

From 1924, FN single-cylinder engines changed from semi unit construction (as seen in the last semi-unit single, the 1922 FN 285TT, in its last year of sale in 1924,) to unit construction engines (as seen in the new-for-1924 M.60).

In 1928, BSA made their first and only two-stroke, a 175 cc unit construction bike, for only one season, otherwise four-stroke twins became unit construction in 1962.

The 1930 Triumph 175 cc Model 'X' two-stroke, two-speed is their first "all-unit construction" two-stroke single-cylinder engine.

From 1932, New Imperial was known for pioneering innovations in unit construction on motorcycles . They made the Unit Minor 150 and Unit Super 250 in this manner and by 1938 all of their machines were unit construction.

In 1938, Francis-Barnett offered a 125 cc unit-construction Snipe.

In 1946, the Series B Vincent employed unit construction and used the engine-gearbox as a stressed member of the frame.

The 1947 Sunbeam S7, an advanced overhead-cam, longitudinal twin, unit construction motorcycle, designed by Erling Poppe, used shaft drive.

In 1957 the Royal Enfield Clipper was replaced by the unit-construction Crusader.

In 1957 the first unit construction twin cylinder motorcycle made by Triumph, the 350 cc (21 ci) 'Twenty One' 3TA, designed by Edward Turner and Wickes, was introduced for the 21st Anniversary of Triumph Engineering Co. Ltd. Unfortunately it also had the first "bathtub" rear enclosure, which proved a sales failure.

The 1958 Ariel Leader used unit construction.

=== Triumph ===
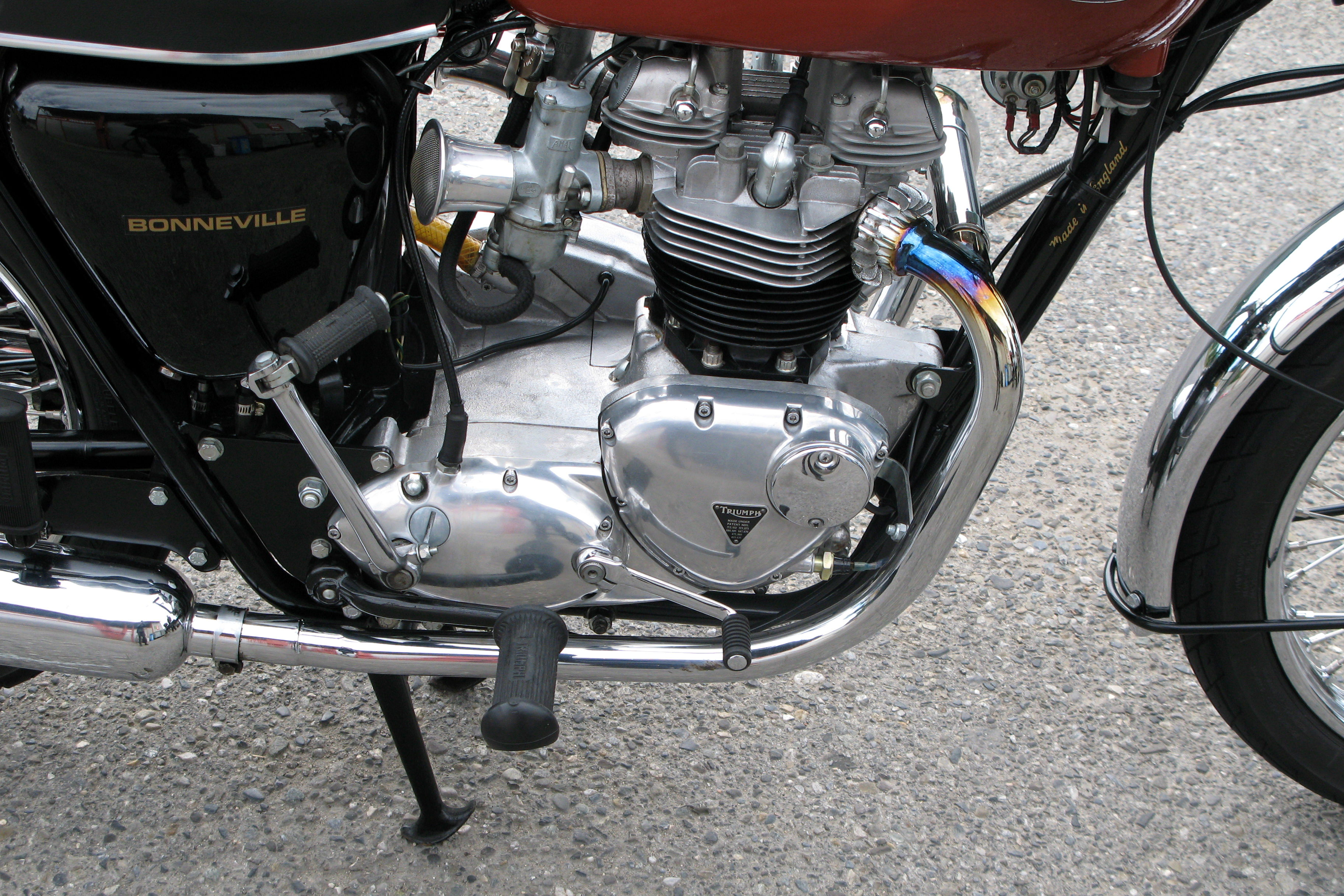
Triumph unit-construction engine

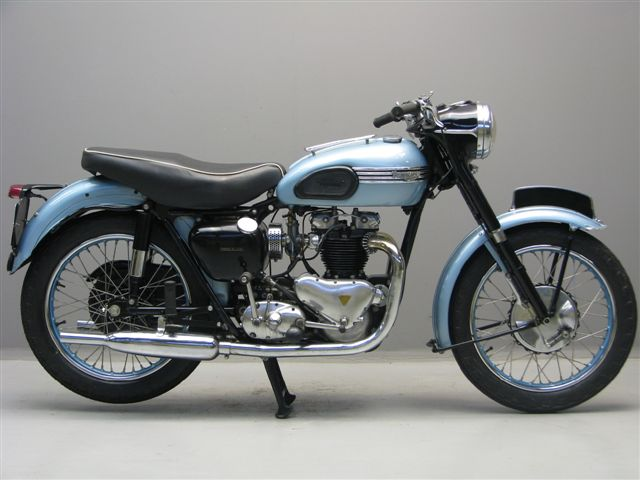
Triumph T110 with pre-unit-construction engine

Triumph Motorcycles produced its first single-cylinder unit construction model with the 149 cc Terrier launched in 1952. It was quickly followed by the more popular 196 cc Tiger Cub in 1953. They made the first twin-cylinder unit construction model in 1957 with the release of the 350 cc Twenty One 3TA (so named because it was approximately twenty-one cubic inches capacity). The 500 cc Triumph 5TA followed, and the 650 cc models were made unit construction in 1963. The 1963—1969 unit construction 650 cc Triumph Bonneville has become sought- after models, partly as the 1970-onward oil-in-frame chassis was considered inferior.

=== BSA ===
==== Unit singles ====
The BSA Bantam range of two-stroke engines introduced the unit construction concept to BSA since its introduction in 1949. BSA produced their first four-stroke unit construction singles in 1959 when they introduced the C15 to replace the venerable c12 single. The unit construction (in contrast to the separate engine and gearbox of the C10/C11 and c12) gave the family of motorcycles started by this model its familiar name.

The C15 was intended as a utility "get to work" model, with a simple yet sturdy design.

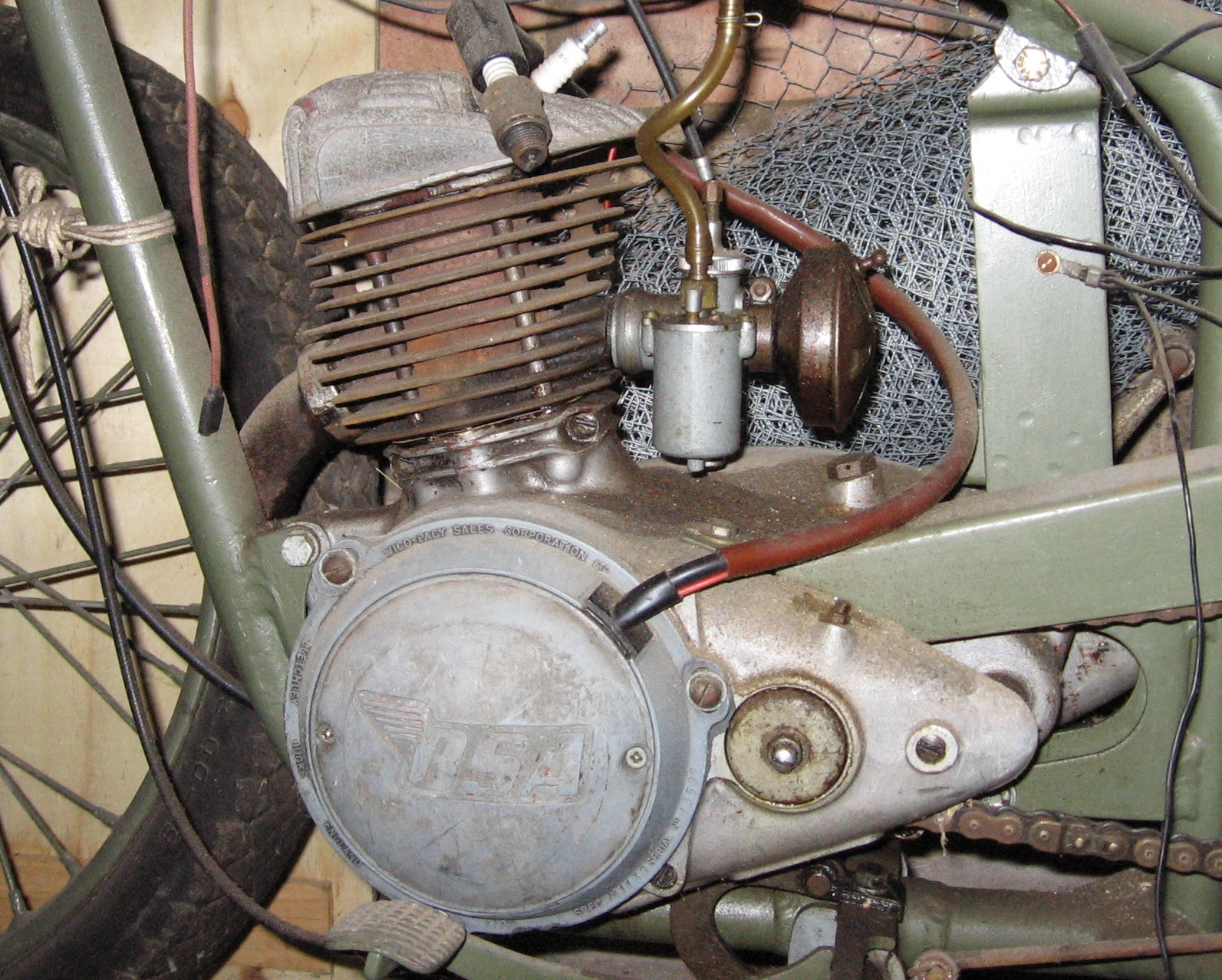
BSA Bantam 125 cc engine on model D1

Along with the C15 came the B40, the 350 cc version. This was no faster than the C15, but had a little more lugging power. A version of the B40 was also produced (in considerable quantities) for various branches of the military. These motorcycles (known as the "Ex-WD B40") were more rugged than the vanilla version (in particular, the timing-side main bearing was over- rather than under-engineered and an oil filter was fitted), slightly de-tuned and given a version of the competition frame. For these reasons, these bikes can make very good buying, and are often used as the basis for competition machines.

Several minor changes were made to the C15 in 7 years (with some variations on the theme - the "warmer" SS80 and SS90, plus competition versions).

In 1967 the model underwent some revisions and a name change to B25. The model then continued with little variation until BSA collapsed in the early 1970s.

The BSA unit single was an affordable introduction to motorcycling for many young men in the 1960s and 1970s. The simple design meant that inexperienced and under-equipped home mechanics could keep them running under most circumstances. The effects of such inexperienced maintenance led to a slightly undeserved reputation for unreliability - a well maintained and regularly serviced unit single will chug along for a very long time with no problems.

The warmer versions (such as the much-loved Starfire) were generally less robust, but their light weight, enjoyable handling and peppy engines meant that many people considered the hours of necessary maintenance a worthwhile trade-off.

Many BSA unit singles were built, meaning there are few 1960s motorcycles with such a large supply of readily available spares. The tunability and ready supply of these motors, combined with their compact and light(ish) construction has also made them a popular choice for modern "Classic" competition.

The BSA design was based on the Triumph Tiger Cub, first produced in 1952. The continuation of the model until 1973 speaks well for the popularity and utility of this design, but also reflects badly on the forward-thinking and investment of the BSA management. By 1967 unit singles were looking slow and rattly and the "charm" of the traditional British oil-leak was wearing thin. The new breed of Japanese motorcycles arriving on the scene were fast and exotic in comparison, and the buying public can certainly not be blamed for their eventual shunning of the entire British motorcycle industry.

== See also ==
- ABC Motorcycle
- BMW motorcycles
- List of BSA motorcycles
- List of Triumph motorcycles
