= Kawasaki W230 =

2025 retro-standard motorcycle by Kawasaki

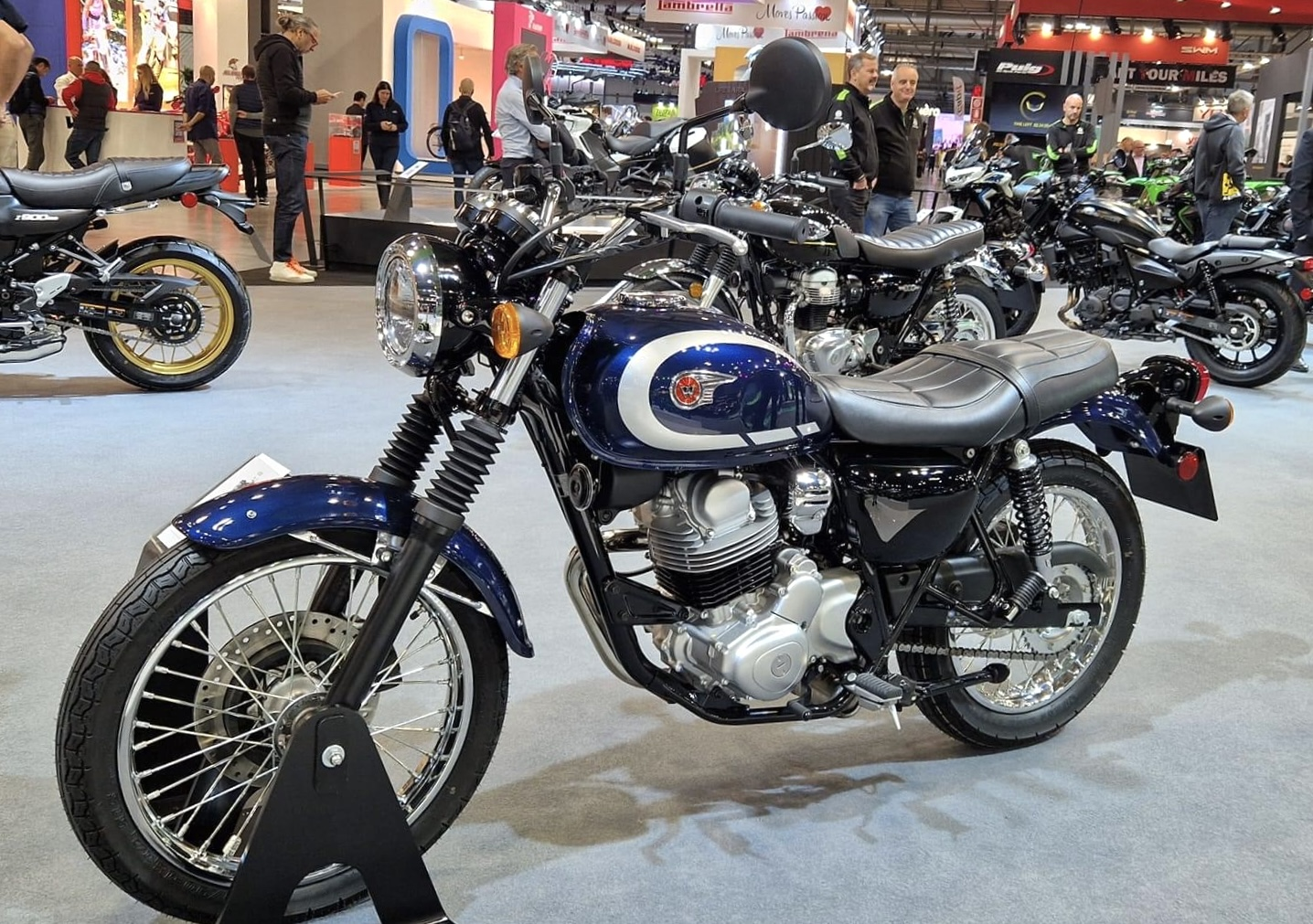
- Manufacturer: Kawasaki Heavy Industries Motorcycle & Engine Company
- Production: 2025–present
- Class: Retro-standard
- Engine: 233 cc, air-cooled, four-stroke, SOHC single-cylinder
- Bore / stroke: 67.0 × 66.0 mm
- Compression ratio: 9.0:1
- Top speed: 121–129 km/h (75–80 mph) (est.)
- Power: 17 hp (12.7 kW) @ 7,500 rpm (claimed)
- Torque: 19 N·m (14 lb⋅ft) @ 5,800 rpm (claimed)
- Transmission: 6-speed, chain final drive
- Frame type: Semi-double cradle steel
- Suspension: 37 mm telescopic fork (front); dual shocks, preload-adjustable (rear)
- Brakes: Disc front and rear, dual-channel ABS
- Tires: 90/90-18 (front), 110/90-17 (rear)
- Wheelbase: 1,415 mm (55.7 in)
- Seat height: 745 mm (29.3 in)
- Weight: 133 kg (293 lb) (dry)
- Fuel capacity: 12 L (3.1–3.2 US gal)

The Kawasaki W230 is a retro-standard motorcycle introduced by Kawasaki for the 2025 model year. It is the mid-range model in the Kawasaki W series, positioned below the W800, but above the W175. The motorcycle combines styling elements from earlier W-series models, such as the 1965 Kawasaki 650-W1, with a modern single-cylinder engine and contemporary safety equipment.

== Development ==
Kawasaki positioned the W230 as an entry-level model in the W series. Its engine is derived from the 233 cc unit used in the Kawasaki KLX230 dual-sport motorcycle, but modified with changes to crankshaft inertia, camshaft profiles, and exhaust tuning for road use and to resemble the character of earlier W-series models.

== Design and styling ==
The motorcycle incorporates styling elements from earlier W models, including a teardrop-shaped fuel tank, wire-spoked wheels, fork gaiters, and chrome fenders. It is equipped with a round headlamp, dual analogue instruments, and a one-piece saddle. Modern additions include LED lighting and an LCD display providing trip and fuel information.

== Technical specifications ==
Kawasaki W230 specifications
Specification	Details
Engine	233 cc, air-cooled, four-stroke, SOHC single-cylinder
Bore × Stroke	67.0 × 66.0 mm
Compression ratio	9.0:1
Claimed power	17 hp (12.7 kW) @ 7,500 rpm
Claimed torque	19 N·m (14 lb⋅ft) @ 5,800 rpm
Transmission	6-speed, chain final drive, positive neutral finder
Frame	Semi-double cradle steel
Suspension	37 mm telescopic fork (front); dual shocks with preload adjustment (rear)
Brakes	Single 265 mm disc (front), 220 mm disc (rear), both with ABS
Wheels/tyres	18 in front (90/90-18), 17 in rear (110/90-17), wire-spoked
Wheelbase	1,415 mm (55.7 in)
Seat height	745 mm (29.3 in)
Ground clearance	150 mm (5.9 in)
Curb weight	143 kg (315 lb) (with fluids)
Fuel capacity	12 L (3.1–3.2 US gal)

== Equipment and features ==
The W230 includes chrome exhausts, rubber fork gaiters, painted steel mudguards, and a multifunction display integrated into the twin analogue dials. Launch colour options were Metallic Ocean Blue/Ebony in North America and Europe, Spark Black in Japan, and Matte Green in parts of Asia.

== Reception ==
Press coverage noted the W230's low seat height, light handling, and resemblance to earlier W-series motorcycles. Reviews also observed its modest power output and relatively higher pricing compared with competitors in the entry-level retro motorcycle segment, including the Royal Enfield Classic 350 and Benelli Imperiale 400.

== Model history ==
Model history
Year	Notes
2025	Launch of the W230 as the entry-level model in the W series

== See also ==
- Kawasaki W series
- Kawasaki W650
- Kawasaki W800
