= Meguro motorcycles =

Japanese motorcycle brand

Meguro Manufacturing
- Native name: 目黒製作所
- Romanized name: Meguro Seisakusho
- Industry: Manufacturing
- Founded: Meguro, Tokyo, Japan; August 1924
- Founder: Nobuji Murata; Takatsugu Suzuki
- Defunct: October 1964
- Fate: Merged into Kawasaki Heavy Industries
- Area served: Japan
- Products: Motorcycles, gearboxes

Meguro (Japanese: メグロ) is a brand of motorcycles originally built by Meguro Manufacturing (目黒製作所, Meguro Seisakusho) before the company was absorbed into Kawasaki Heavy Industries. Once a prestige brand, supplying the Japanese government with military and police motorcycles and racing alongside Honda, Meguro became bankrupt after launching a range of lightweight motorcycles which sold poorly, and experiencing a yearlong strike.

The Society of Automotive Engineers of Japan rates the 1937 Meguro Z97 as one of their 240 Landmarks of Japanese Automotive Technology.

== History ==
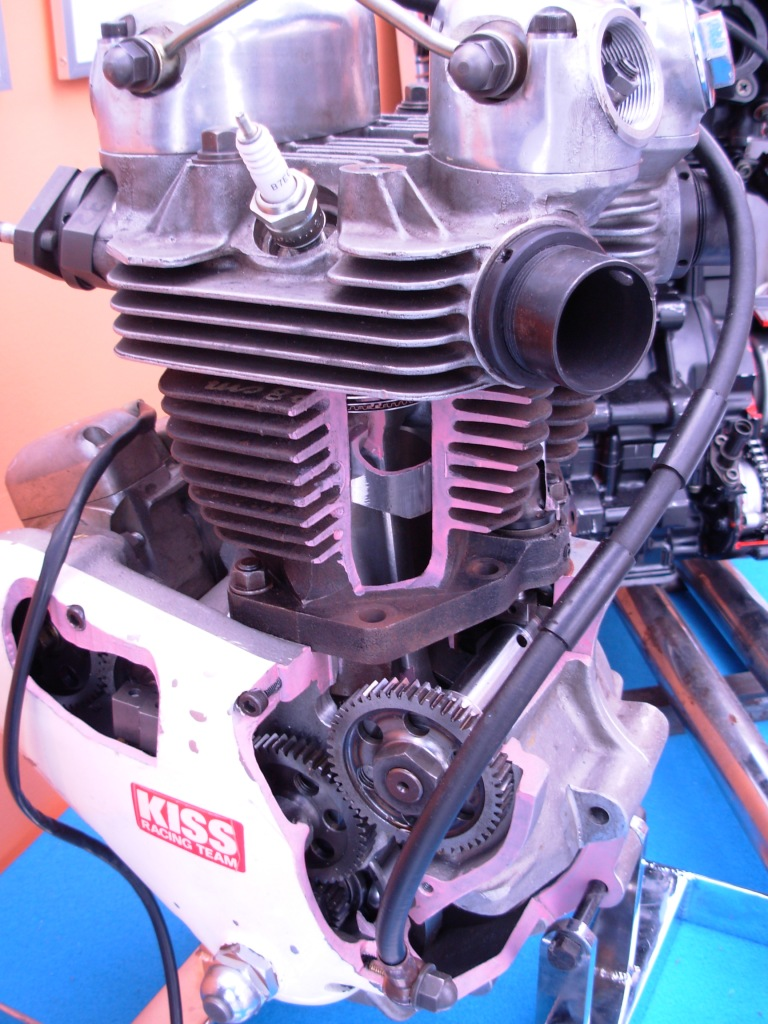
Meguro MR twin-cylinder engine cutaway

Meguro Manufacturing was founded by Nobuji Murata and Takatsugu Suzuki in 1924 to produce motorcycle parts for the nascent Japanese motorcycle industry. Named after a district of Tokyo, Meguro had its roots in Murata Iron Works, which was established in 1922. After the 1929 Wall Street crash, Meguro invested in Harley-Davidson and obtained drawings, tooling and important knowledge of metal heat treatments in order to make gearboxes. These were then used in their vehicles and those of another early Japanese company called Rikuo (陸王; "Land King"). The resulting transfer of American intellectual property taught the Japanese how to produce motorcycles in quantity.

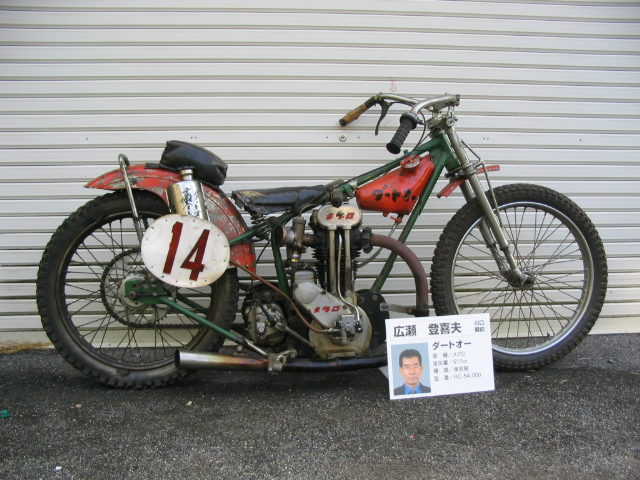
Meguro racing motorcycle

In 1935, Meguro debuted the 500 cc single-powered Z97, based on a Swiss Motosacoche design, but production was restricted due to the start of World War II, during which the company supplied aircraft parts. Meguro started full production again in 1948, the Z97 being joined by models with 125 cc, 250 cc and 350 cc overhead valve singles. In the 1950s, Meguro entered racing and built its first twin-cylinder design, the 651 cc T1 "Senior", with a British-inspired pre-unit parallel twin engine, and later the K series "Stamina" model, a copy of the BSA A7, one of which Meguro had bought in 1953. Its quality and engineering were superior to that of the BSA, and it was described by British motorcycle designer Edward Turner as "too good to be true". For the first time, the Japanese motorcycle industry was seen as a threat. Its other models, designed in collaboration with Kawasaki, were entirely of Japanese design. Meguro raced their 500 cc overhead camshaft single at the Asama Kazan speedway in Tsumagoi, Gunma. For many years, the company was only outsold by Honda. In 1958, Meguro developed a range of 50 cc, 125 cc, 250 cc and 350 cc consumer products, which failed to sell due to being too expensive. By 1960, Meguro was Japan's longest-running motorcycle company out of the hundreds that had once flourished producing copies of European models. The company had become affiliated with Kawasaki; it first changed its name in 1962 to Kawasaki-Meguro, which produced the successful 125 cc B8. Then, in October 1964, seeing the commercial and marketing value of a motorcycle division and Meguro's established sales outlets alongside its heavy industry operations, Kawasaki took full control of the company.

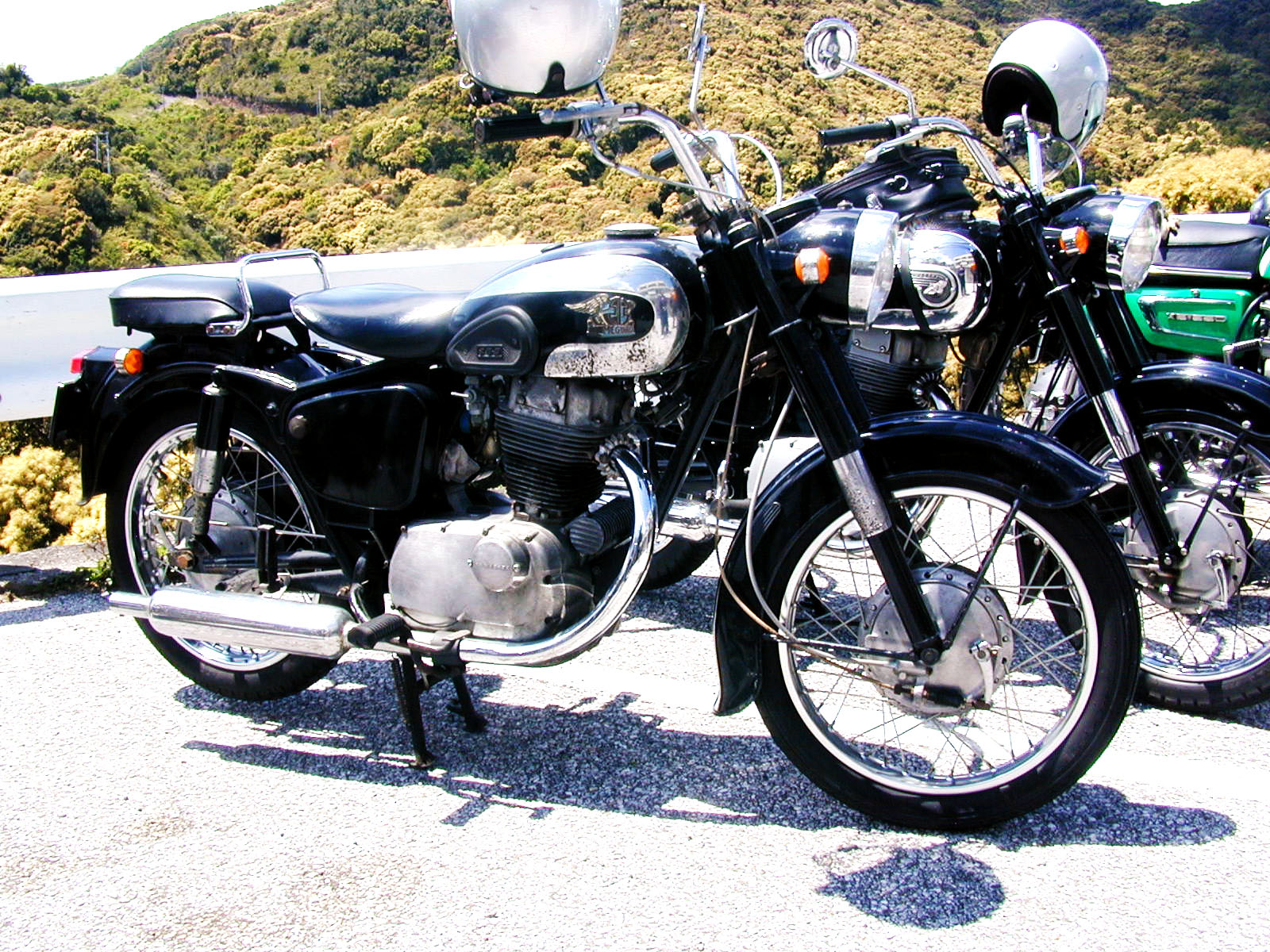
Kawasaki 250 Meguro SG

"Kawasaki-Meguro Works"-branded 125 cc, 175 cc and 250 cc single-powered motorcycles continued to be sold until 1969. The 500 cc K series twin-cylinder model was later enlarged and developed into the 625 cc Kawasaki W series, which would see use as an official vehicle for government purposes.

=== Influence on Kawasaki retro models ===
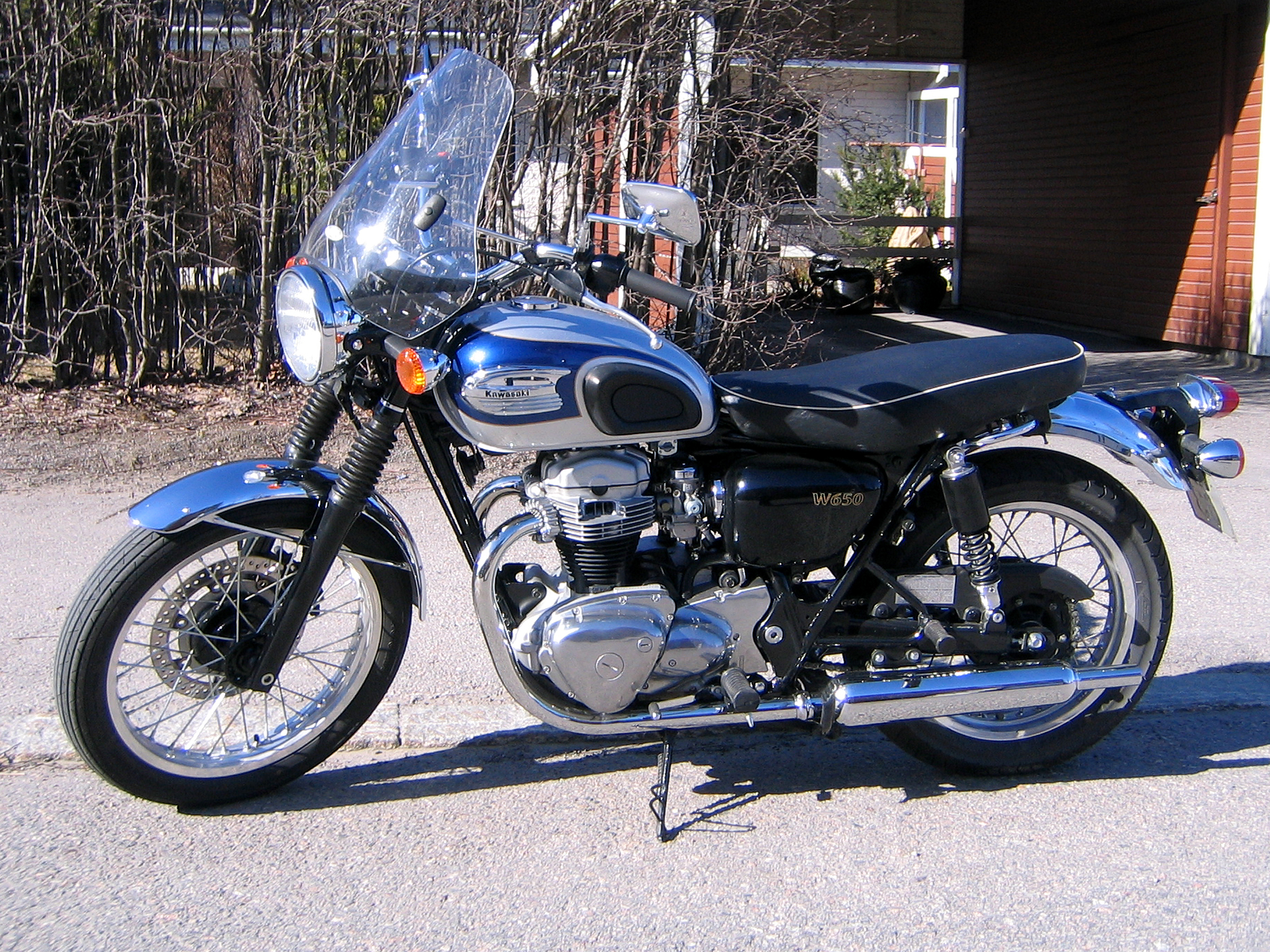
Kawasaki W650

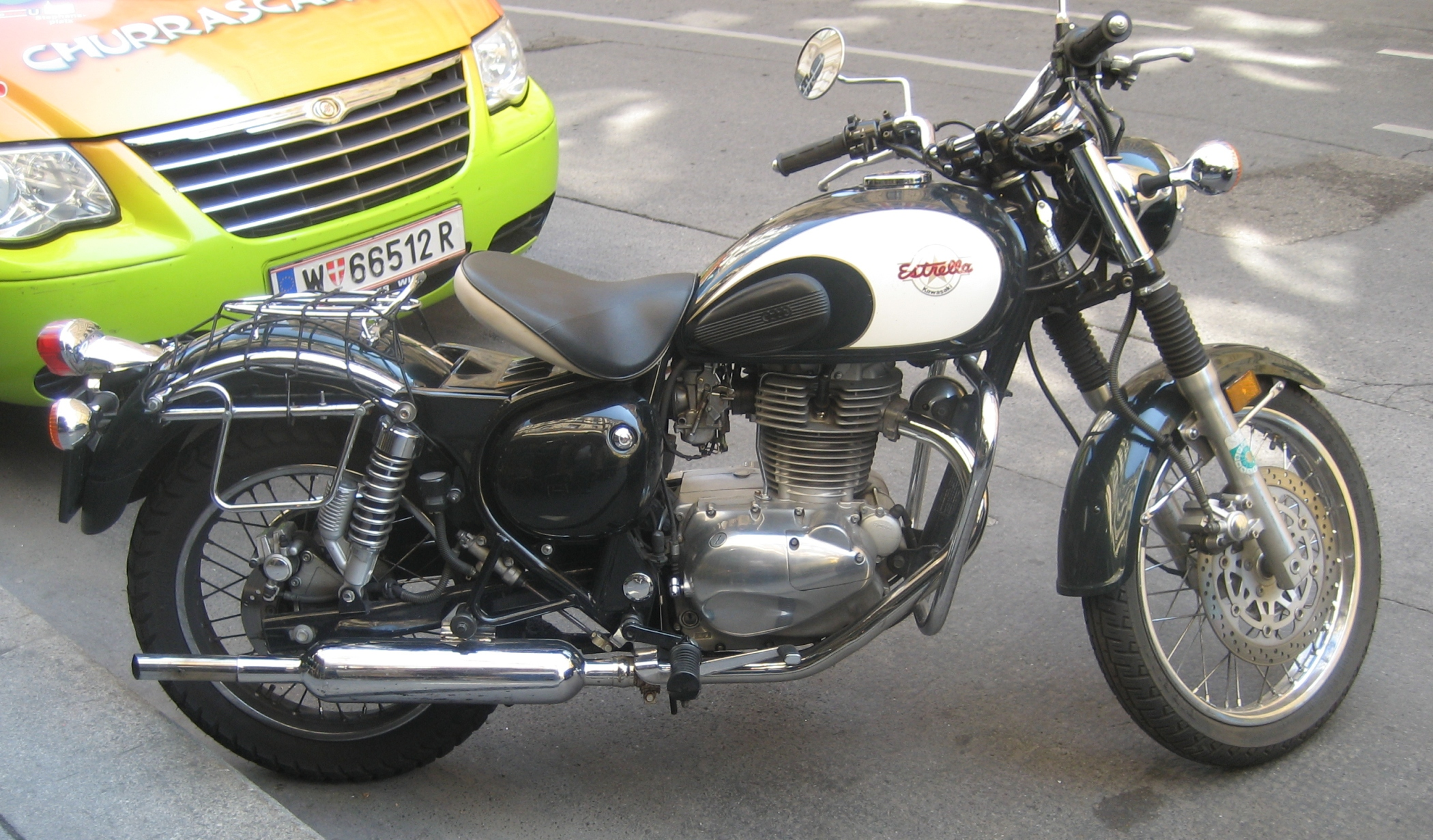
Kawasaki Estrella

In 1999, Kawasaki launched the 675 cc parallel-twin W650 with retro styling inspired by the Kawasaki W2, and the 250 cc four stroke single-cylinder Meguro-inspired Estrella. Kawasaki discontinued the W650 in 2007, but replaced it in 2011 with an enlarged version, the 773 cc W800.

=== Revival ===
On December 8, 2020, Kawasaki announced the revival of the Meguro brand with a new model—the W800-based K3—available on February 1, 2021. Both the K3 and W800 are mechanically identical, but the K3 is visually distinct and priced higher. The K3 was followed by the S1, a 250 cc single based on the Kawasaki W230, in late 2024.

== Former models ==
Years produced	Name	Displacement (cc)	Layout	Notes
1937–1938	Z97	500	Single, OHV	Capable of 11 PS (8.1 kW).
1938-1941	Z98	500, 600	Single, OHV	
1947-1951	Z1	500	Single, OHV	
1950-1951	J Junior	250	Single	Equipped with a hydraulic front fork and no rear suspension; engine designed by Tetsuji Makita of Kurogane fame.
1951-1952	J2 Junior	250	Single, OHV	1952 models were equipped with rear suspension.
1951-1952	Z2	500	Single, OHV	Equipped with a hydraulic front fork.
1952-1953	Z3	500	Single, OHV	Improved rear suspension compared to the Z2.
1952-1956	J3 / J3A	300	Single	
1953-1954	S Junior	250		
1953-1955	Z5	500	Single, OHV	Equipped with a four-speed gearbox.
1953-1956	Y Rex	346	Single, OHV	Capable of 13 PS (9.6 kW). Competed in the São Paulo 400th Anniversary Race in 1954, but did not start after a crash during qualifying.
1954-1956	S2 Junior	250	Single, OHV	Equipped with a four-speed gearbox.
1955-1956	Z6	500	Single, OHV	Improved engine capable of over 20 PS (14.7 kW); used by postwar government agencies.
1955-1960	T1 Senior	650	Parallel twin, OHV	Capable of 29.5 PS (21.7 kW).
1956-1959	S3 Junior	250	Single, OHV	
1956-1960	Z7 Stamina	500	Single, OHV	
1957-1959	Y2 Rex	346	Single, OHV	Improved engine capable of 16 PS (11.8 kW); frame design incorporating both steel tubing and plating.
1957-1960	T2 Senior	650	Parallel twin, OHV	Capable of 31 PS (23 kW); used mostly as police motorcycles.
1958-1960	F	250	Single, SOHC	
1959	S5 Junior	250	Single, OHV	
1959-1962	FY	325	Single	
1959-1962	YA Argus	325	Single	Sports version of FY.
1960	KS Stamina Sports	500	Parallel twin	Tokyo Motor Show-exclusive sports-tuned prototype; capable of 39 PS (28.7 kW).
1960-1963	S7 Junior	250	Single, OHV	Later models were equipped with a starter motor and 12-volt electrical system.
1960-1965	K Stamina	500	Parallel twin	
1962-1964	S8 Junior	250	Single, OHV	Equipped with a starter motor, 12-volt electrical system, and swingarm rear suspension.
1962-1964	AT Autorack	250	Single, OHV	Commercial model based on the S3; equipped with a lower-height rear carry rack.
1963-?	J8	300	Single	Changes made to exhaust system compared to the J3.
1964-1969	250 Meguro SG	250	Single	Branded as a Kawasaki, and the last model to wear the Meguro nameplate until 2021.
1965-1966	K2	500	Parallel twin	Branded as a Meguro-Kawasaki, and also sold as the Kawasaki 500.
1966	650 X	650	Parallel twin	Tokyo Motor Show-exclusive Kawasaki W series prototype, branded as a Meguro-Kawasaki.
