= Kawasaki W175 =

Motorcycle produced by Kawasaki from 2017

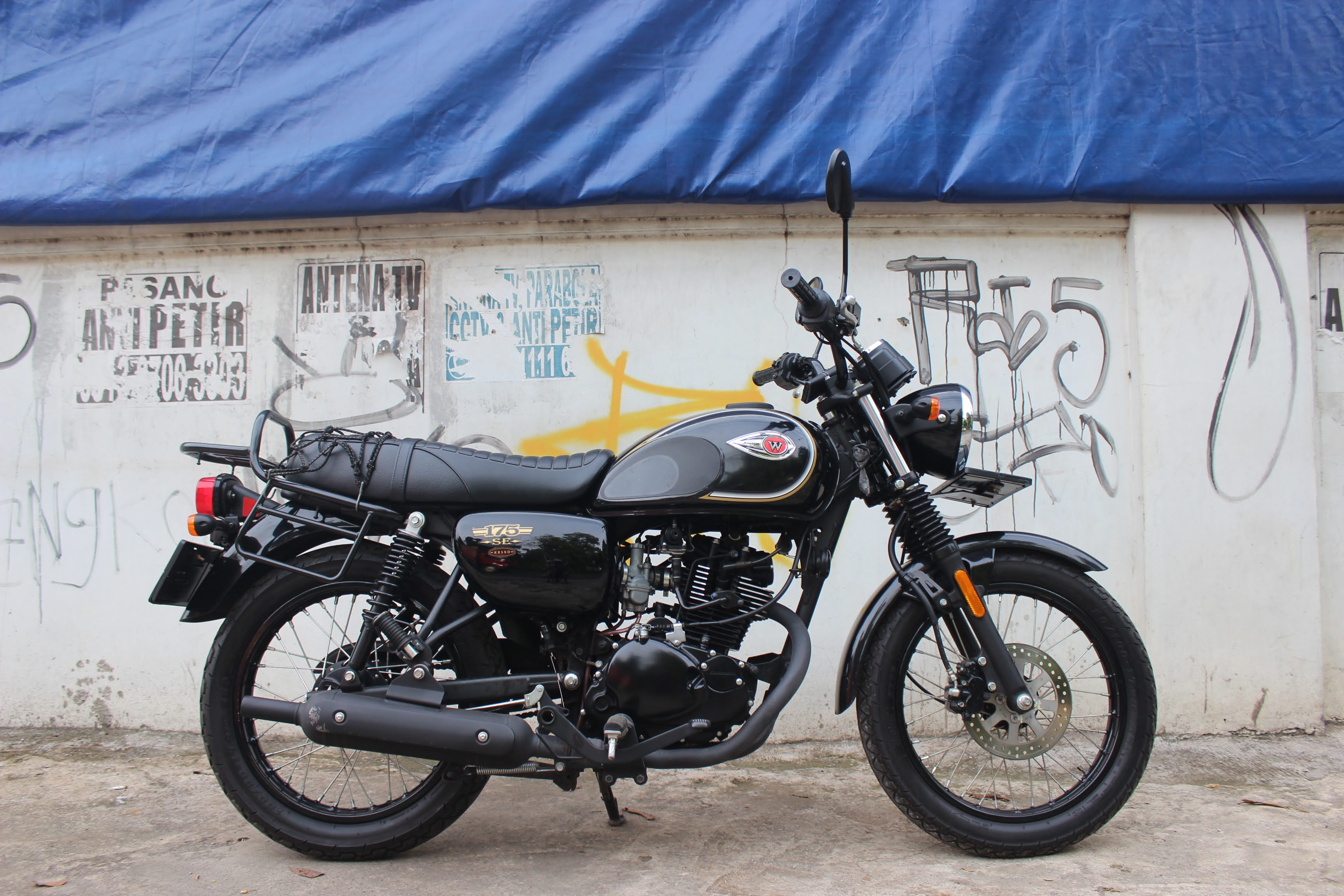
- Manufacturer: PT Kawasaki Motor Indonesia
- Parent company: Kawasaki
- Production: 2017–
- Assembly: Bekasi, West Jawa, Indonesia
- Predecessor: Kawasaki EL175
- Class: Standard
- Engine: 177 cc (10.8 cu in) air-cooled single
- Bore / stroke: 65.5 mm × 52.4 mm (2.58 in × 2.06 in)
- Compression ratio: 9.1:1
- Top speed: 110 km/h
- Ignition type: CDI
- Transmission: Multi-disc wet clutch, 5 speed, chain
- Frame type: Steel tubular double cradle
- Suspension: F: 30 mm inverted telescopic R: swingarm, dual shock absorbers, adj. preload
- Brakes: F: 220 mm disc R: 110 mm drum
- Tires: F: 80/100-17M/C 46P; R: 100/90-17M/C 55P
- Rake, trail: 26.0°, 76 mm
- Wheelbase: 1,275 mm (50.2 in)
- Dimensions: L: 1,930 mm (76 in); W: 765 mm (30.1 in); H: 1,030 mm (41 in)
- Seat height: 775 mm
- Fuel capacity: 13.5 L (3.0 imp gal; 3.6 US gal)
- Related: Kawasaki Barako

The Kawasaki W175 is a 177 cc (10.8 cu in) air-cooled four-stroke single-cylinder motorcycle made by Kawasaki since 2017. It is a retro styled, like the Kawasaki W series along with the Estrella (now called as W250), W650, and W800.

Kawasaki held the world premiere launch for this bike at Jakarta in November 2017, and began offering the bike for the Indonesian domestic market. The W175 was original exported for Thailand, Philippines, and Latin American markets such as Uruguay, Mexico and Bolivia. The model was launched in North America in May of 2026.

The engine is fuelled by a Mikuni VM24 carburetor, aimed for easier maintenance. Like the W800, the bike does not have a kick start, instead it is equipped with electric start. No center stand (although a side stand does come as standard), no tachometer, and no fuel indicator.

This bike gained some popularity among bike modification enthusiasts and public figures, including President Jokowi of Indonesia who owns a chopper-style modified version of this bike and Governor Ridwan Kamil of West Java.

It is sold in a few different versions, including the W175 Standard, W175 Cafe, and W175 TR dual purpose. All versions except the dual-purpose have a teardrop styled 13.5 L (3.0 imp gal; 3.6 US gal) fuel tank. The dual purpose TR models have a 7.5 L fuel tank. For the lighting equipment, the bike uses halogen bulbs for the H4 60/55 headlight with clear multi reflectors. The turn indicators and mirrors are shared with the Kawasaki KLX150.

Performance wise, the bike was tested by an automotive journalist team and got a top speed figure of 110.1 km/h. Based on the test, the bike could accelerate to 100 km/h in 16.3 seconds.

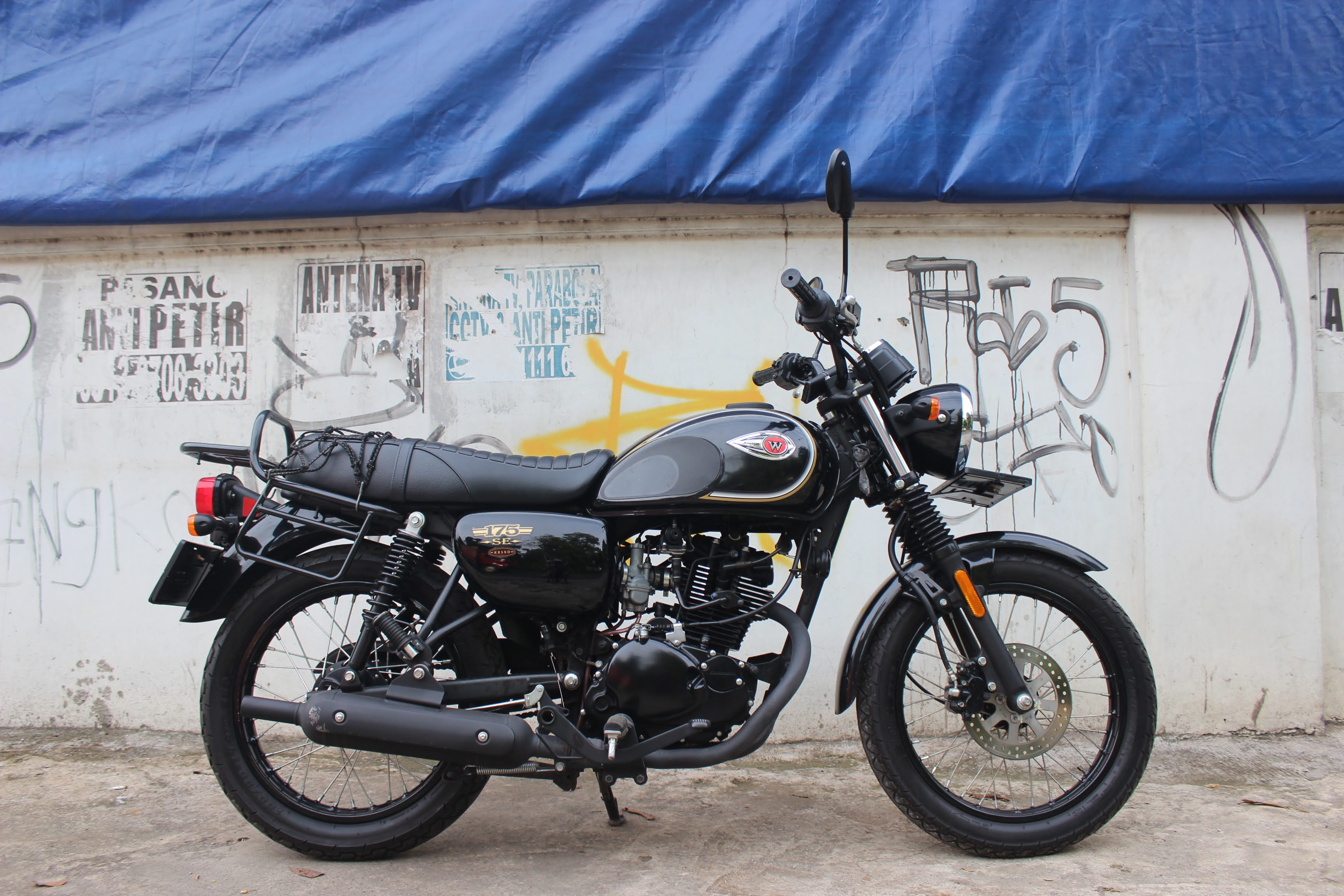
2018 Kawasaki W175 SE Right Side View

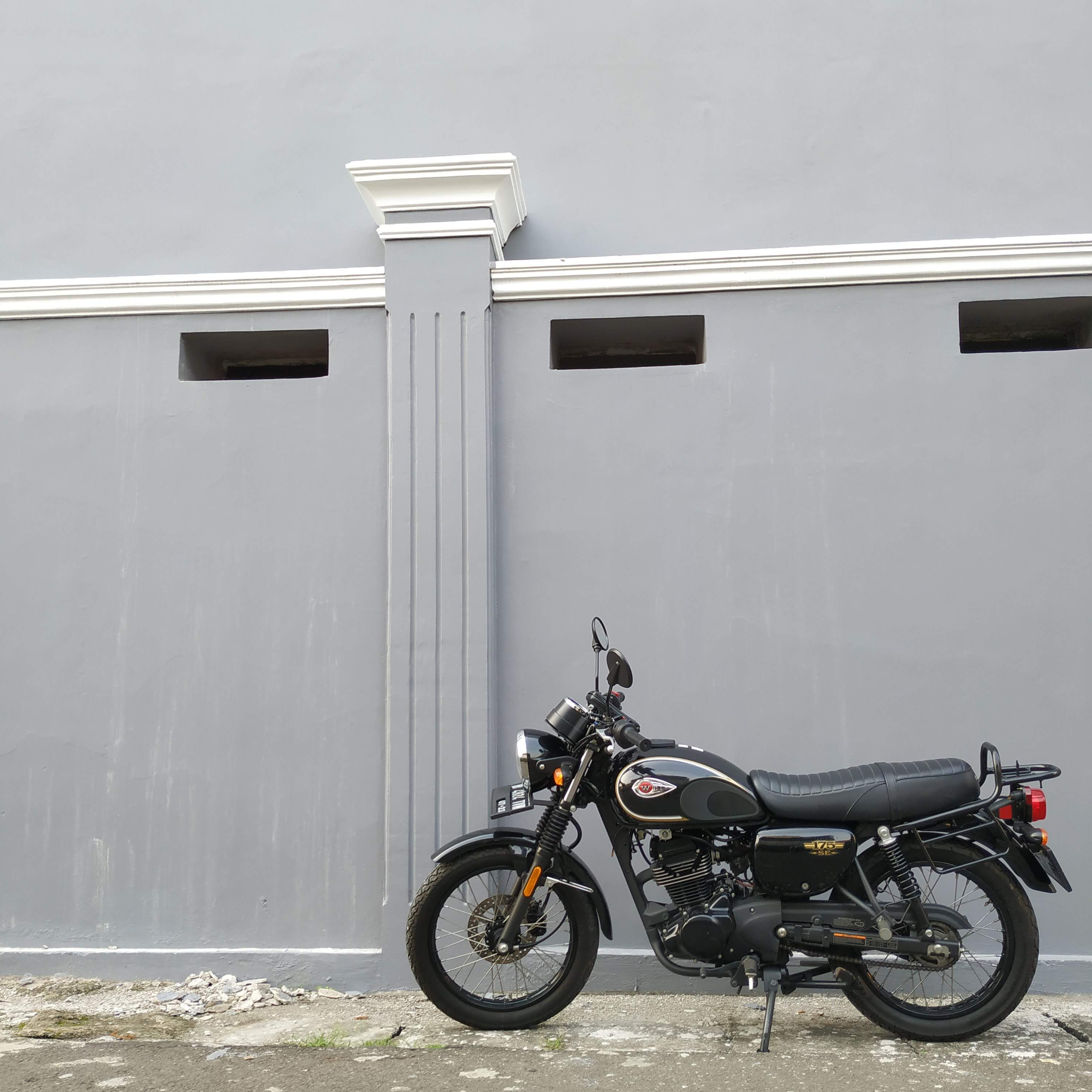
2018 Kawasaki W175 SE Left Side View

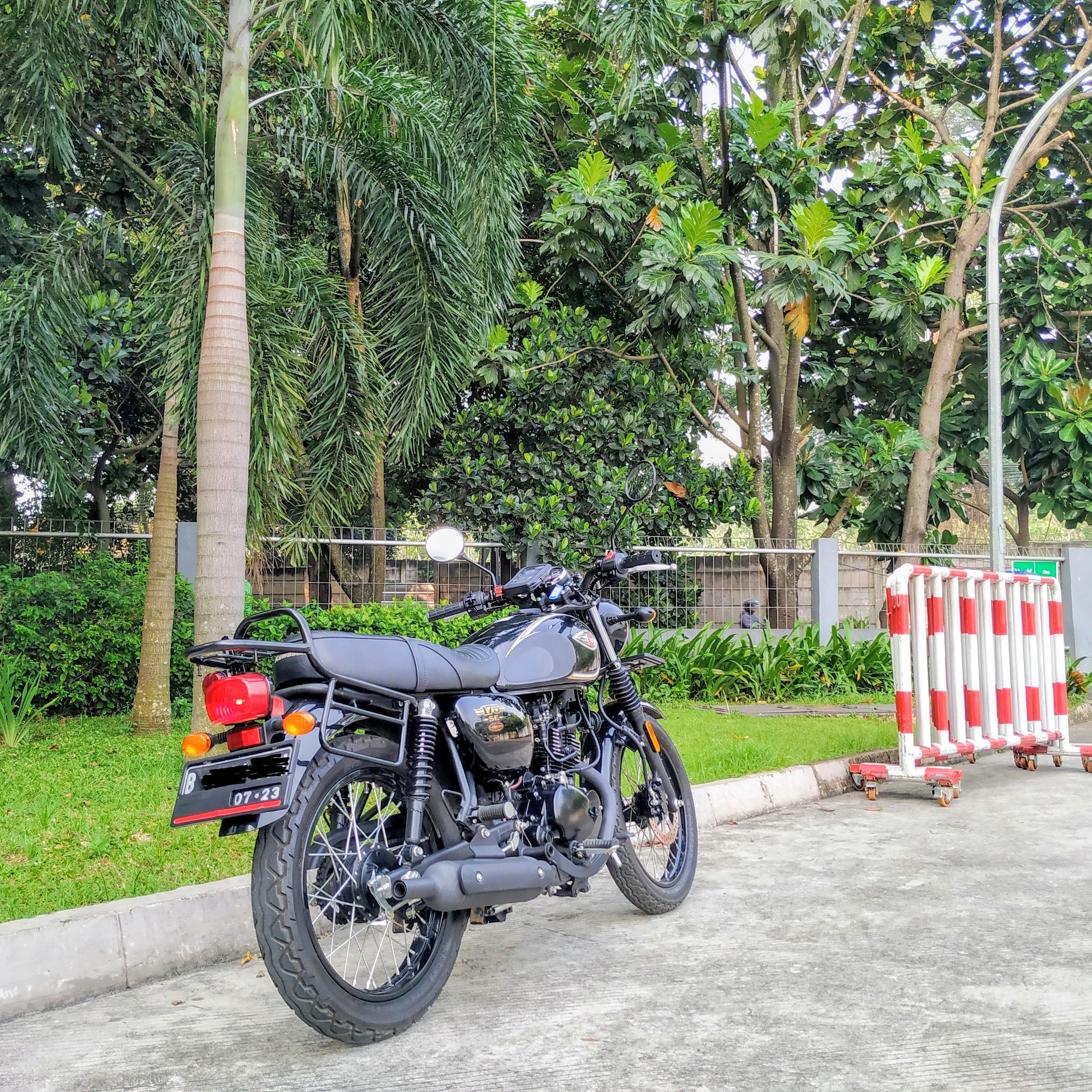
2018 Kawasaki W175 SE Rear Side View

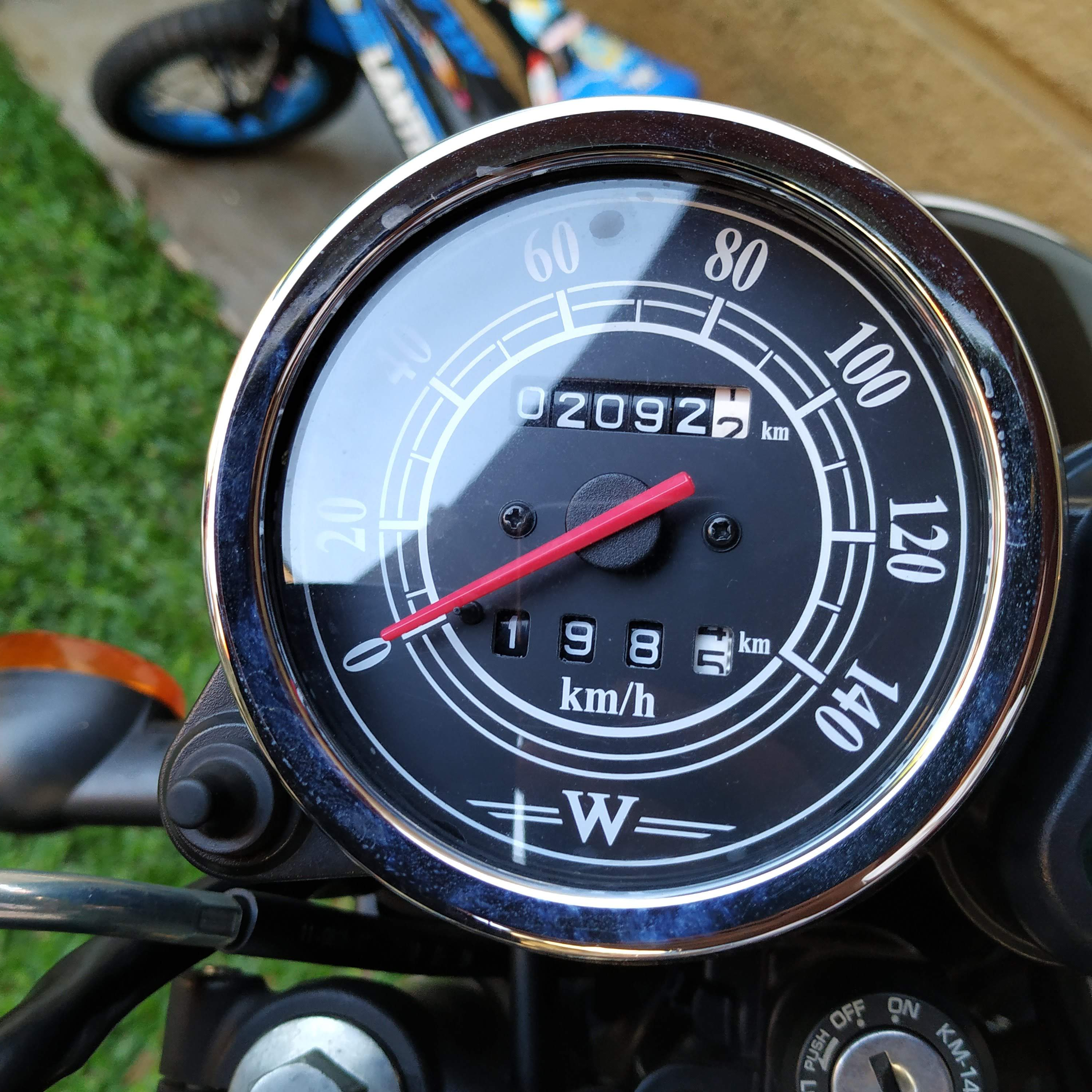
2018 Kawasaki W175 SE Meter Cluster
