= BSA A7 =

Motorcycle

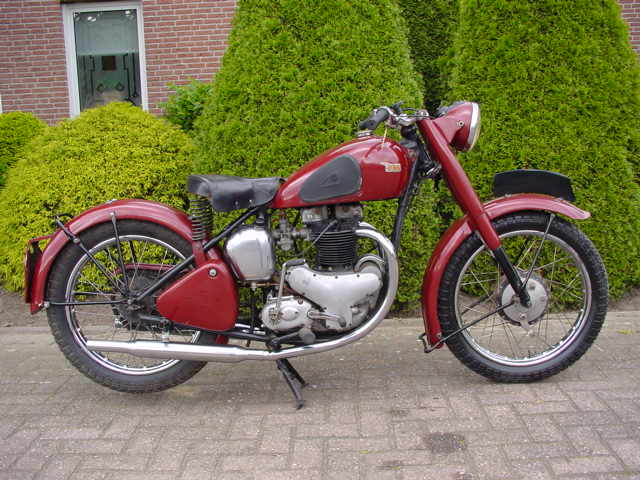
- 1948 BSA A7, with rigid rear end
- Manufacturer: BSA
- Production: 1946–1962
- Assembly: Small Heath, Birmingham England
- Successor: BSA A50
- Engine: 495 and 497 cc (30.2 and 30.3 cu in) straight twin
- Bore / stroke: 495: 62 mm × 82 mm (2.4 in × 3.2 in); 497: 66 mm × 72.6 mm (2.60 in × 2.86 in)
- Top speed: 85 mph (137 km/h) (495); 90 mph (140 km/h) (497)
- Power: 26 bhp (19 kW) (495); 30 bhp (22 kW) @ 5800 rpm (497)
- Ignition type: Magneto
- Transmission: Duplex primary chain to 4-speed gearbox, bolted to rear of crankcase Single-row primary chain to separate 4-speed gearbox (swinging arm models)
- Frame type: Rigid; Plunger; Half-duplex cradle
- Wheelbase: 1,391 mm (54.75 in)
- Weight: 166 kilograms (366 lb) (dry)
- Fuel capacity: 3.5 imp gal (16 L)

The BSA A7 is a range of 500cc parallel-twin engined motorcycles that was made by Birmingham Small Arms Company (BSA) at its factory in Armoury Road, Small Heath, Birmingham. The range was launched in 1946 with a 495 cc (30.2 cu in) long-stroke engine. An improved 497 cc (30.3 cu in) version based on the BSA A10 engine was launched in 1950. Various A7 models continued in production with minor modifications until 1961–62, when the unit construction A50 model superseded them.

== Development ==
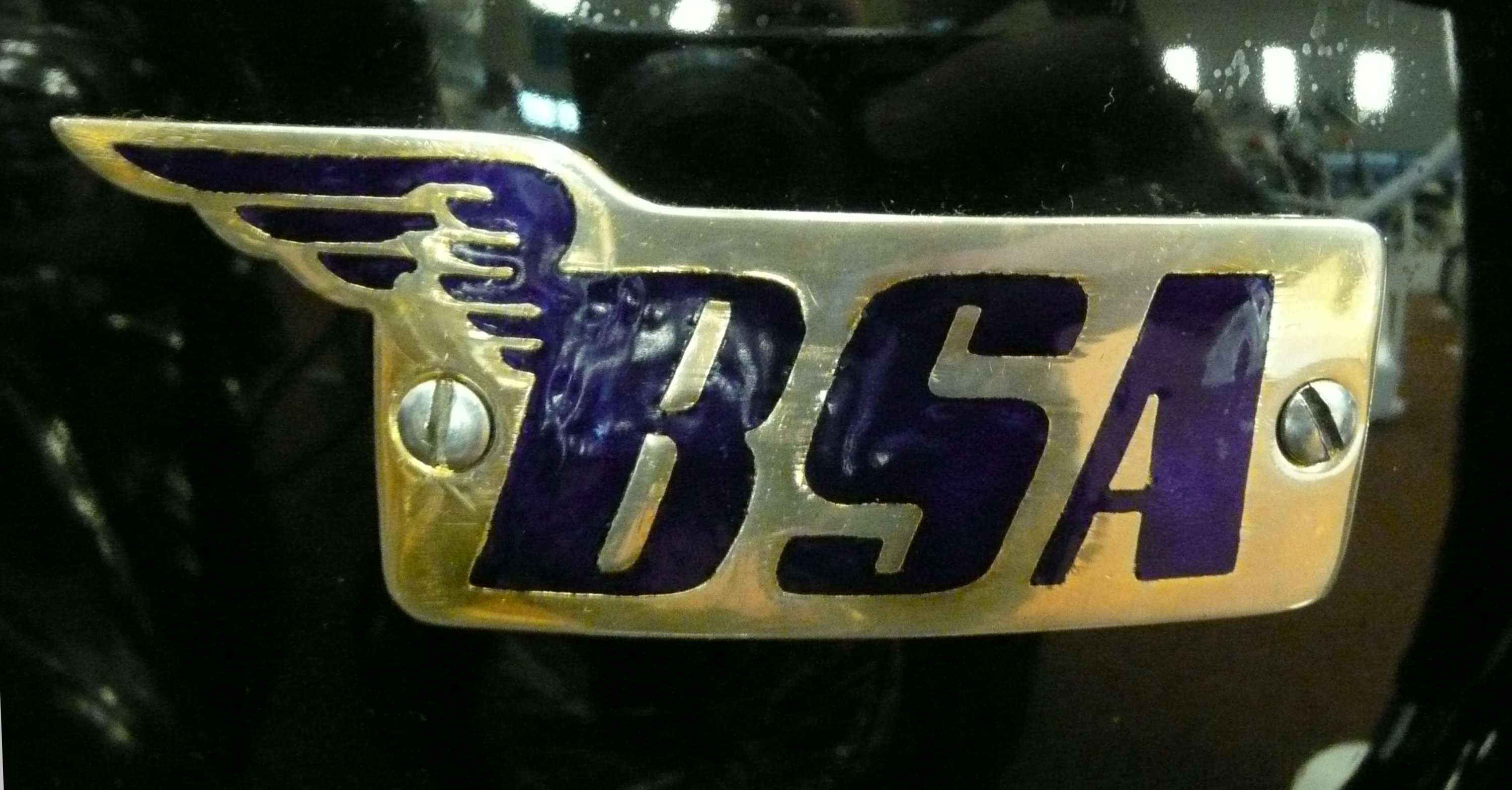
A7 fuel tank badge

After the 1938 launch of the Triumph Speed Twin designed by Edward Turner, BSA needed a 500cc parallel twin to compete with it. Designed by Herbert Parker, David Munro and BSA's chief designer, Val Page, the A7 was BSA's first parallel twin. World War II delayed the launch, but several prototypes were built during the war. The model was launched in September 1946, after hostilities had ended.

The very first A7 off the production line was flown to Paris for the first motorcycle show after the end of the war. There was huge demand for affordable transport after the war and the simplicity of the A7 twin was helped along by the slogan "It's time YOU had a BSA!".

== Engine ==
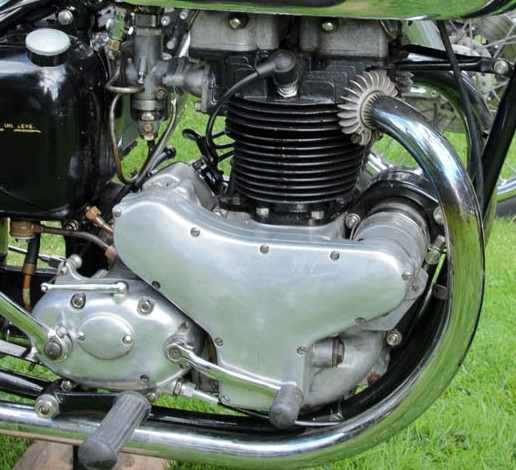
1947 long-stroke A7 engine, with gearbox bolted to the crankcase

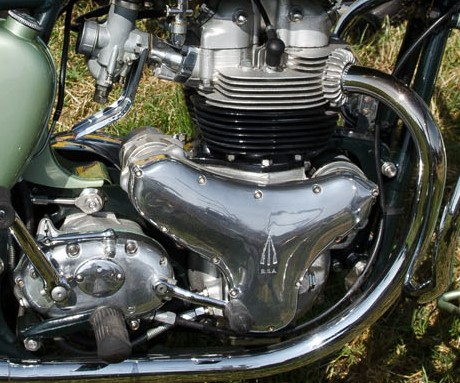
1955 A7SS Shooting Star engine, with separately-mounted gearbox

The 495 cc (30.2 cu in) twin cylinder engine produced 26 bhp (19 kW) and was capable of 85 mph (137 km/h). The engine has a long stroke, with a bore and stroke of 62 mm × 82 mm (2.4 in × 3.2 in). A single camshaft behind the cylinders operates the valves via long pushrods passing through a tunnel in the cast iron block. This system needed numerous studs and nuts to secure the cast iron cylinder head and rocker boxes, many of them deeply recessed and requiring good box spanners, or the then uncommon socket spanners. As with other British motorcycles of the era, this set-up often led to oil leaks.

In October 1949, BSA launched the 650 cc A10 parallel twin, designed by Bert Hopwood. The engine in the A10 is a redesigned and improved version of the A7 engine. A 497 cc version of the redesigned engine was produced for the A7. Initially fitted in the higher-performance A7S Star Twin, it was also fitted to the A7 base model in 1951. The revised engine has a shorter stroke, with bore and stroke dimensions of 66 mm × 72.6 mm (2.60 in × 2.86 in).

In most motorcycles of this period, the primary drive chain that takes power from the engine to the gearbox is tensioned by drawing or rotating the gearbox backwards on a hinge with threaded rods. This is known as pre-unit construction. By contrast, the gearbox in the first A7s is bolted to the back of the crankcase, with an internal tensioner for the duplex primary chain. However, in 1954 when swinging arm rear suspension was introduced, the re-design used the less modern pre-unit construction and single-row primary chain. The electrics, as was universal for larger British motorcycles of the era, comprised two independent systems: the self-contained Lucas magneto for ignition, and a dynamo to charge the battery for lights and the horn. The first A7s were fitted with a single Amal Type 6 carburettor, which has a separate float chamber. Later models were fitted with Amal TT and then Amal 376 Monobloc carburettors.

== Cycle parts ==
The A7 was launched with a rigid frame and telescopic front forks. One useful feature is a hinged rear mudguard that lifts up for the rear wheel to be removed more easily.

Plunger rear suspension was offered as an option from 1949 onward. However, BSA was concerned at the high rate of wear on the plunger suspension, which lead to poor handling. A new frame, with swinging arm rear suspension, was introduced in 1954, and the rigid and plunger frames were discontinued.

== Model range ==
=== Overview of models ===
All models are swinging arm frame unless otherwise indicated.

1947	1948	1949	1950	1951	1952	1953	1954	1955	1956	1957	1958	1959	1960	1961	1962
A7 (Rigid) (Note: 495 cc (30.2 cu in) "long stroke" engine to 1951, improved 497 cc (30.3 cu in) engine from 1951)															
		A7 (Plunger)													
							A7 (Note: Also known as "A7 Flash" in the US)								
														A7 (Alternator)	
		A7S Star Twin (Plunger) (Note: Available with rigid frame as a special order from the factory)													
							A7SS Shooting Star								

=== A7 ===
The A7 was launched in 1947 with a rigid frame and the long-stroke engine with an iron cylinder block and cylinder head. Plunger suspension was offered as an option from 1949. The engine was changed to the shorter-stroke A10 based design in 1951. The rigid frame was discontinued in 1953, and the plunger in 1954. From 1954 the swinging arm frame was produced, and the name "Flash" given to the model in the US market. An alternator was offered as an alternative to the dynamo from 1961. Production ceased in 1962, when the unit-construction A50 was introduced.

=== A7S Star Twin ===
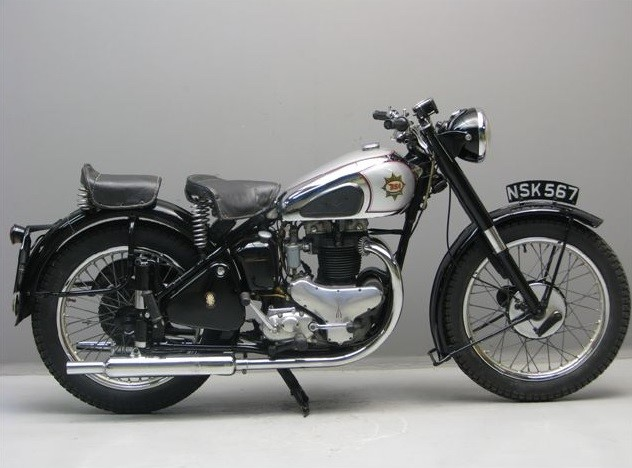
1949 A7S Star Twin, with plunger rear suspension

To compete with the Triumph Tiger 100, BSA launched the A7S Star Twin. This model has an increased compression ratio. It has the later A10-based engine, and the latest design of cylinder head with austenitic steel inlet and exhaust valves. The inlet manifold is separate from the cylinder head, so twin carburettors can optionally be fitted. The uprated engine was installed in a plunger frame, and finished with extra chrome. The model was made with an option of rigid or plunger frames. In 1953, a new alloy head was fitted, together with an Amal Monobloc carburettor. The model was discontinued in 1954 in favour of the Shooting Star model.

=== A7SS Shooting Star ===
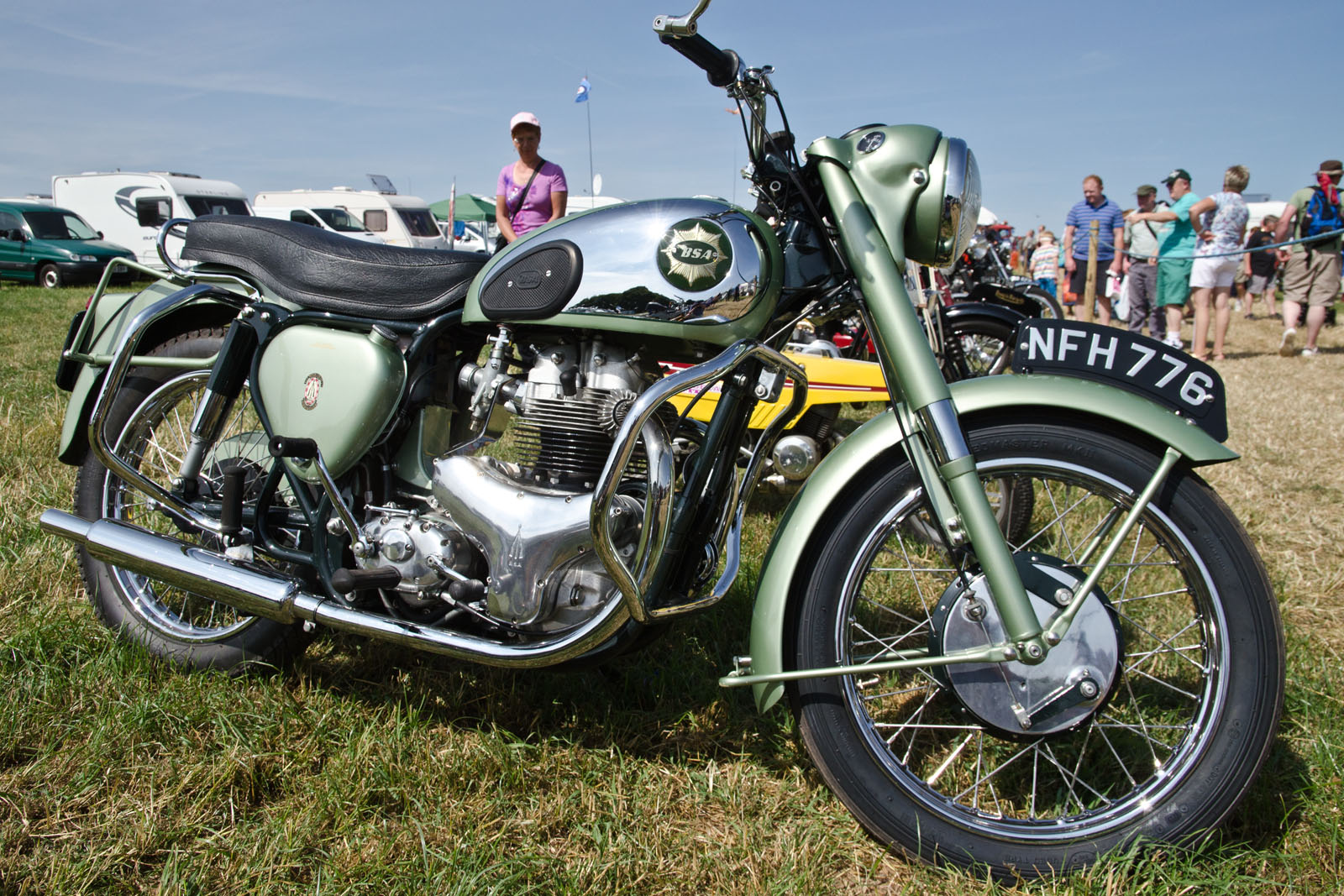
1955 A7SS Shooting Star, with swinging arm rear suspension

The Shooting Star was introduced in 1954 with the new swinging arm frame. The engine has a higher-performance cam, and compression was upgraded from 6.6:1 to 7:1. Power was increased to 30 bhp (22 kW) at 5800 rpm, with a top speed of just under 90 mph (140 km/h). The earlier models had a dark green frame, and a separate carburettor manifold fitted to the alloy cylinder head. By the end of production in 1962, the Shooting Star was the culmination of the development of the A7, with a black frame with metallic light green tank, mudguards and side panels. It has an alloy cylinder head, duplex cradle frame and swinging arm rear suspension, full-width cast iron wheel hubs, with drum brakes of eight inch diameter at the front, and seven inch diameter at the rear.

== Sporting success ==
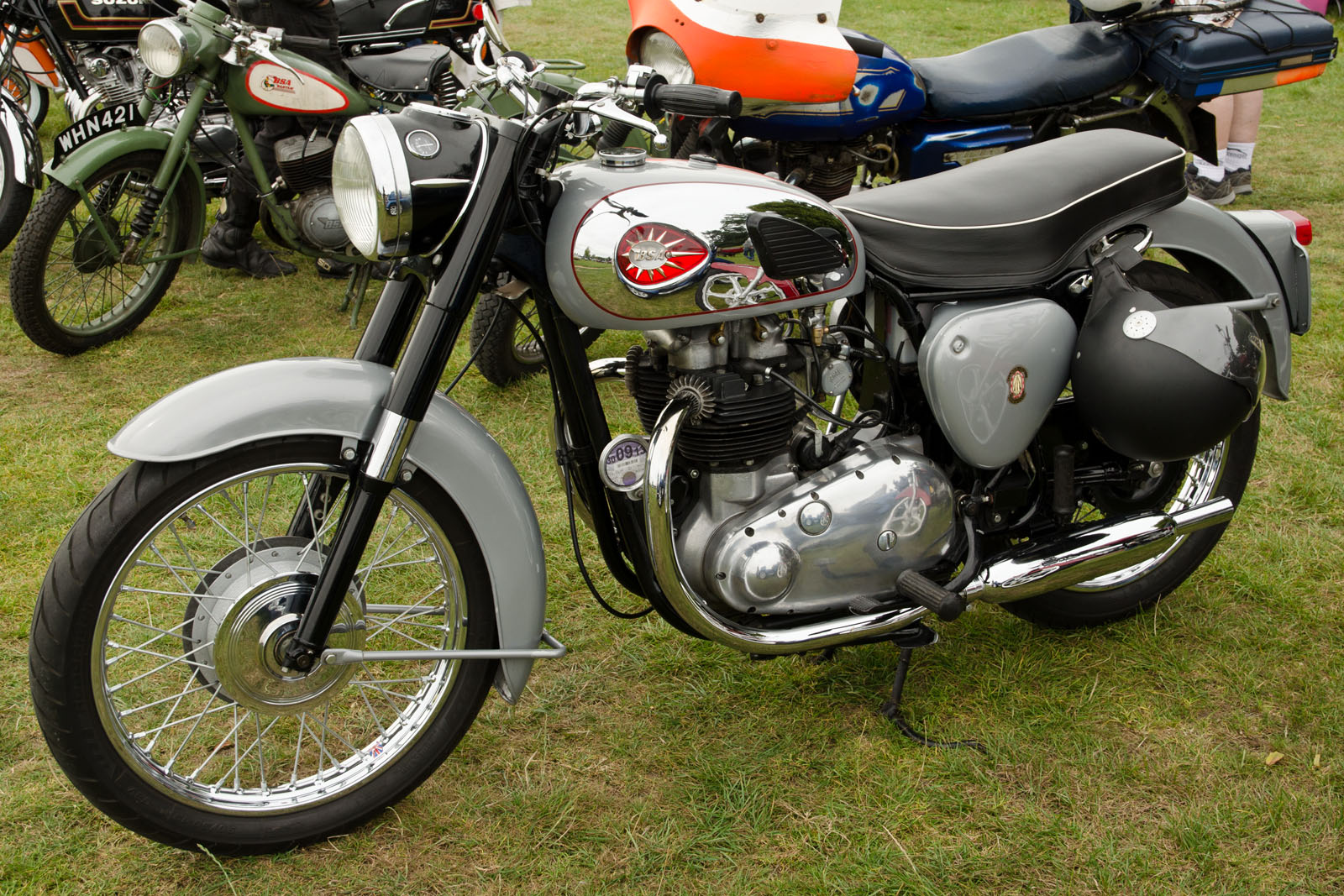
1958 A7 Star Twin, showing primary drive case

=== 1952 Maudes Trophy ===
In 1952, three BSA A7s were entered for the Maudes Trophy and the International Six Days Trial, achieving 4,500 miles (7,200 km) without problems, and confirming the reliability of the design. All three machines were randomly selected from the production line. They won gold medals, and earned BSA the Team award as well as the Trophy. The three machines were ridden by Brian Martin, Fred Rist and Norman Vanhouse. The team rode from Birmingham to Vienna, and then on through Germany, Denmark, Sweden, and Norway, before returning safely and with a clean sheet to Birmingham.

=== US speed record ===
Also in 1952, American BSA dealer Hap Alzina prepared a BSA Star Twin for an attempt on the American Class C speed record for standard catalogue motorcycles. The rules prevented major modification, but Alzina was allowed to use 80 octane fuel, which together with a compression ratio of 8 to 1 enabled rider Gene Thiessen to achieve a two way record speed of 123.69 mph (199.06 km/h).

=== 1954 Daytona 200 ===
In 1954, Bobby Hill won the Daytona 200 riding a rigid framed Shooting Star. His machine's rigid frame was a special order from the factory. In the 1950s, the race had one asphalt straight, and the other on the beach. Of the 107 starters, only 44 finished. Shooting Stars finished 1st, 2nd, 4th and 5th. A BSA Gold Star finished in 3rd.

== Meguro and Kawasaki derivatives ==
In 1960, Kawasaki Heavy Industries acquired an interest in the Meguro motorcycle company, which had bought a license to make a copy of the BSA A7. Meguro had been Japan's largest motorcycle manufacturer, but in the late 1950s its models had become less competitive, and it was short of money. Kawasaki's investment enabled Meguro to launch its A7 copy as the Meguro K.

In 1963, Meguro was taken over one hundred per cent by the new Kawasaki Motorcycle Corporation. Kawasaki maintained the licensing agreement with BSA and continued to build the K model. Due to lubrication problems, Kawasaki made engine modifications, and the Kawasaki K2 entered production in 1965 with improved crankshaft bearings and a larger oil pump. Since the introduction of the K2, the Meguro K model has tended to become known retrospectively as the K1.

In 1965, the K2 was enlarged to 624 cc to become the Meguro X-650 prototype, which was displayed at the 1965 Tokyo Motor Show. The X-650 then became in turn the prototype for the Kawasaki W1. For the new 650cc Kawasaki, the traditional look of Meguro motorcycles was replaced with a sleeker fuel tank, sportier mudguards, and other details intended to appeal to export markets, especially North America.

== See also ==
- List of motorcycles of the 1940s
