= Kawasaki W series =

Line of motorcycles made by Kawasaki

Kawasaki W1, W2, W3
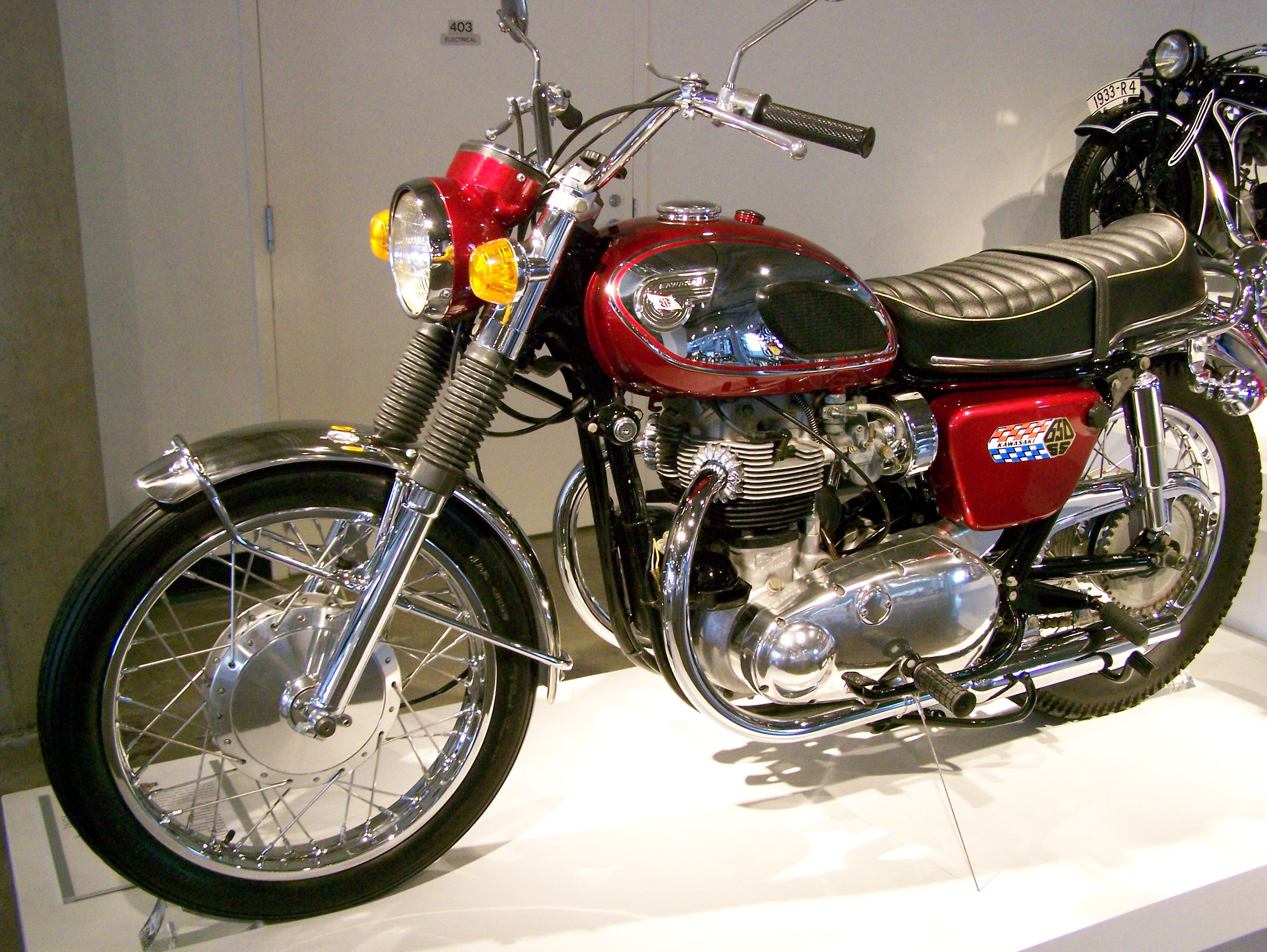
- Kawasaki W1SS, a two-carburetor offshoot of the original W1 with the brake pedal on left side
- Manufacturer: Kawasaki Aircraft Industries, later Kawasaki Motorcycle & Engine Company
- Also called: Meguro X-650, Kawasaki 650 Commander, Kawasaki RS650
- Parent company: Kawasaki Heavy Industries
- Production: 1965—1974
- Assembly: Akashi City, Hyogo Prefecture, Japan
- Predecessor: Meguro K1, Kawasaki K2
- Successor: Kawasaki W650
- Class: Standard
- Engine: 624 cc (38.1 cu in) 4-stroke, inline 2-cylinder, air-cooled, OHV
- Bore / stroke: 74.0 mm × 72.6 mm (2.91 in × 2.86 in)
- Compression ratio: W1 8.7:1; W2 9.0:1
- Top speed: W1 180 km/h (110 mph); W2 185 km/h (115 mph)
- Power: W1 50 PS (37 kW; 49 hp) @ 6500 rpm W2 53 PS (39 kW; 52 hp) @ 7000 rpm
- Ignition type: Battery ignition
- Transmission: Manual 4-speed
- Frame type: Steel tube duplex cradle
- Suspension: F: Telescopic; R: Swingarm
- Brakes: F: Mechanical drum, double 2 leading R: Mechanical drum, leading trailing
- Tires: F: 3.25-18; R: 3.50-18
- Wheelbase: 1,415 mm (55.7 in)
- Dimensions: L: 2,126 mm (83.7 in); W: 880 mm (35 in); H: 1,060 mm (42 in)
- Weight: 181 kg (399 lb) (dry)
- Fuel capacity: 15 L (3.3 imp gal; 4.0 US gal)
- Oil capacity: 3 L (3.2 US qt)

The Kawasaki W series is a line of vertical-twin standard motorcycles motorcycles made by Kawasaki beginning in 1965. First sold as a 1966 model in the North American market, the initial Kawasaki W1 had the largest engine displacement of any model manufactured in Japan at the time.

Based heavily on a licensed version of the post-war, pre-unit construction, 500cc vertical-twin BSA A7, the bikes were clearly aimed at the market then dominated by the classic British twins of the day. Production of the original series, which saw W2 and W3 models, ended in 1974. In 1999 the W650 appeared, and was produced through 2007. In 2011 Kawasaki announced another retro version of the “W” brand, the W800, which remained in production until 2016, then was re-introduced in 2019. A W175 was released in 2017.

== Antecedents: Meguro K series ==
In 1960 the Akashi-based Kawasaki Aircraft Company acquired an interest in the Meguro motorcycle company, which had obtained a license to produce a copy of the 500 cc BSA A7. Meguro had been Japan's largest motorcycle manufacturer but in the late 1950s its models had become less competitive and it was short of money. Kawasaki's investment enabled Meguro to launch its A7 copy as the Meguro K.

The BSA A7, Meguro K and their respective derivatives have an overhead valve (i.e., pushrod) straight-twin engine with a pre-unit construction architecture. All have a 360° crankshaft angle, which provides an even firing interval between the two cylinders but high vibration caused by the two pistons rising and falling together.

In 1963 Meguro was taken over one hundred percent by the new Kawasaki Motorcycle Corporation, which maintained the licensing agreement with BSA and continued to build the K model, but due to lubrication problems Kawasaki made engine modifications and the Kawasaki K2 entered production in 1965 with improved crankshaft bearings and a larger oil pump. Since the introduction of the K2, the Meguro K model has tended to become known retrospectively as the K1.

The K2 has a larger timing cover which distinguishes it from the model K and the BSA A7. Also the K2 chassis has a different rear subframe, fuel tank and side panels. These changes gave the K2 a typically conservative Meguro image, dissimilar to the original BSA A7.

In 1965 the K2 was enlarged to 624 cc to become the Meguro X-650 prototype, which was displayed at the 1965 Tokyo Motor Show. The X-650 then became in turn the prototype for the Kawasaki W1. For the new Kawasaki big bike, the traditional look of Meguro motorcycles was replaced with a sleeker fuel tank, sportier mudguards (fenders) and other details intended to appeal to export markets, especially North America.

The Society of Automotive Engineers of Japan (in Japanese), includes the 1966 Kawasaki 650-W1 as one of their 240 Landmarks of Japanese Automotive Technology.

=== Design ===
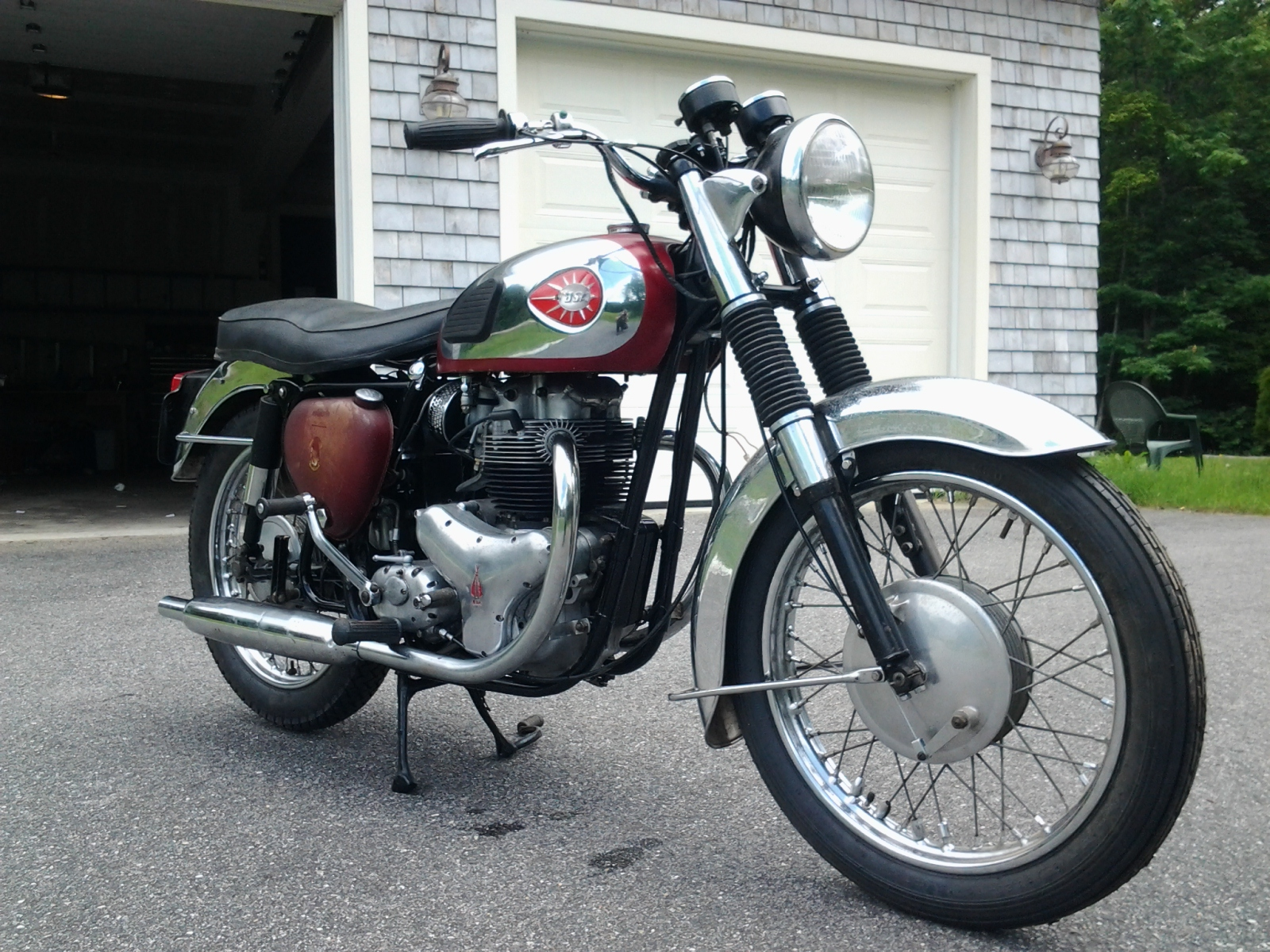
1960s BSA A10 Super Rocket

The Kawasaki W1 is based heavily on the post-war, pre-unit construction, 500cc vertical-twin BSA A7 design inherited from Meguro, but as time passed, the Kawasaki and BSA designs diverged. The BSA engine has a 70 mm (2.8 in) bore and 84 mm (3.3 in) stroke, whereas the W1 inherited its 72.6 mm (2.86 in) stroke from the K2 engine, adding displacement by increasing the size of its bore to 74 mm (2.9 in). This slightly oversquare (i.e., short-stroke) design favors higher engine speeds, while reducing stresses on the crankshaft. In addition, the new W1 had a multi-piece pressed crankshaft assembly with ball bearings and one-piece connecting rods with needle bearings, significant changes from the earlier BSA (and Meguro) engines that used plain insert type bearings and two-piece connecting rods. The BSA and Kawasaki 650cc engines were thus mechanically different, but they looked very similar.

Likewise, in the design of its twin-loop frame, as well as its overall styling, the W1 motorcycle was clearly influenced by classic British road bikes, including shifting with the right foot and braking with the left. From 1966 to 1968 W1 engines were built with a single 31 mm Mikuni carburetor (this is only feasible in a straight-twin with a 360° crankshaft angle). Starting in 1968, the W1SS with two 28 mm Mikuni carbs took the place of the original W1. Also in 1968, the W2 (aka Commander) emerged. The W2SS was a restyled W1SS with slightly more horsepower, and the W2TT was a high-pipe version with twin mufflers on the left side. Due to flat sales in North America the W2TT was discontinued in 1969, the W2SS ended in 1970, and finally in 1971 Kawasaki axed the W1SS.

The 650 remained popular in Japan, and although some were exported to Europe in the 70s, subsequent models were produced primarily for the domestic market. The penultimate model in the W series was the W1SA with stylistic changes, but most importantly with the gearshift lever on the left side and the rear brake pedal on the right side, which is the standard configuration for Japanese motorcycles. The final version was the 1973 W3 model (aka RS650) with upgraded suspension as well as twin disc brakes in front. W series production ceased in 1974.

=== Competition ===
As soon as the W1 was released, Kawasaki realized that even an improved version of the BSA A10 (itself already discontinued) was at a disadvantage against the newer and faster unit construction British twins, the BSA Spitfire and the Triumph Bonneville T120. The W1 also had to compete with other Japanese twin-cylinder street bikes, such as the Suzuki T500 and the Honda CB450. If the W1 was seen as being behind the times, then Kawasaki came back with a two-stroke engine that was clearly ahead of its time, in the 1967 Kawasaki A7 Avenger with performance at least equal to the W1. The following year the W series (as well as the British bikes) faced a new competitor in a state-of-the-art twin from Yamaha, the XS650.

In 1968 the domination of the inline-twin engine for high-performance street bikes came to an end when Triumph Engineering developed an inline-triple engine for the BSA Rocket 3/Triumph Trident. The 1969 Kawasaki H1 Mach III with an inline-triple two-stroke, and the Honda CB750's Inline-four engine into the bargain, foreshadowed the ascendancy of multi-cylinder engines. The W series engines were oil-tight and reliable, but by comparison they had low levels of performance with high levels of vibration, and were ultimately unsuccessful on the sales floor. At the same time that production of the W series was ending in Japan, Kawasaki came up with a formula for successful four-stroke street bikes in its Z series.

== Descendants: Kawasaki W brand ==
Kawasaki retro style motorcycles began with the Zephyr range, available in Japan as a 400 cc model. These retro-bikes evoked nostalgia for classic motorcycles from decades earlier, inspired by the Z series inline-fours from the 1970s. By the late 1990s successors to the Zephyrs were based on even older generations of motorcycles with twin-cylinder engines, the V-twin engined Drifter and the vertical-twin W650. Unlike the 1960s W series, the 1999–2007 W650 had an up-to-date engine design while holding on to the vintage British motorcycle look. The 2011–2013 W800 carries on with the W brand, and expands the range to include Café racer models.

In 2017, a smaller Kawasaki W175 was introduced in Indonesia for the South East Asian market thus becoming the lightest bike in the series.

== See also ==
- Kawasaki W230
