= Pre-unit construction =

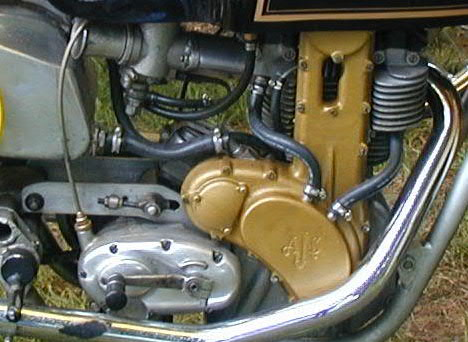
AJS racing motorcycle showing typical pre-unit construction engine and gearbox layout with mounting plates, slotted holes and screw-thread adjusters visible

Pre-unit construction, also called separate construction, is a motorcycle engine architecture where the engine and gearbox are separate components with their own oil reservoirs, linked by a driving chain within a primary chaincase. Mounting plates are usually attached to the frame allowing for chain adjustment by gearbox fore-and-aft movement and via screw adjusters and elongated mounting holes. Even though Singer offered an integrated engine and gearbox in a single casing in 1911, it was not until the 1950s that technical advances meant it was possible to reliably construct engines with integral gearboxes in a single unit, known as unit construction.

Another variant is semi-unit construction, where the gearbox is bolted directly to the engine. Early BSA A10 and A7 parallel twins (650cc and 500 cc, respectively) were semi-unit construction, but the factory later adopted pre-unit construction.

The term "pre-unit" was coined only after such engines were succeeded by "unit construction" designs. The term pre-unit particularly applies to BSA/Triumph's single- and twin-cylinder bikes after this firm adopted unit construction in the early 1960s. (By contrast Norton and Royal Enfield never advanced beyond pre-unit construction). Even after adopting unit construction BSA/Triumph still kept separate oil systems for the engine and gearbox. It was the Japanese who introduced the practice of using the same oil in motorcycle engines and gearboxes. With the exception of the Issigonis Mini family of cars, the practice in the automobile industry has also been to keep engine and gearbox oil separate. Gearbox oil needs to cope with large shearing forces, while engine oil need to be capable of acting as a coolant, so the adoption of a single lubricant for engine and gearbox is always something of a compromise.

A pre-unit motorcycle would not normally be able to use the engine as part of the frame as a stressed member, since the engine/primary-chaincase/gearbox assembly would not be sufficiently rigid. The 1969 'Isolastic'-framed Norton Commando had its pre-unit engine, gearbox, and swingarm assembly bolted together on plates fixed to the frame via shimmed rubber bushes.

Among the Japanese manufacturers, Kawasaki produced a separate construction 650 cc vertical twin, inherited as a consequence of taking over Meguro in 1964. The Meguro K models were copies of the BSA A7 and BSA A10 design, but although external appearances were similar, no parts are interchangeable with the BSA forebears.

== History ==
In the early days of motorcycles, particularly in Europe, several manufacturers (such as Rudge) were diversifying from making bicycles to motorcycles. These firms would build, say, the frame and fuel tank, but most of the other elements, such as engine, gearbox, brakes, electrics, controls and instruments were bought in from outside manufacturers such as JAP, Villiers and Lucas. This situation made pre-unit construction almost inevitable.
