= Kawasaki W800 =

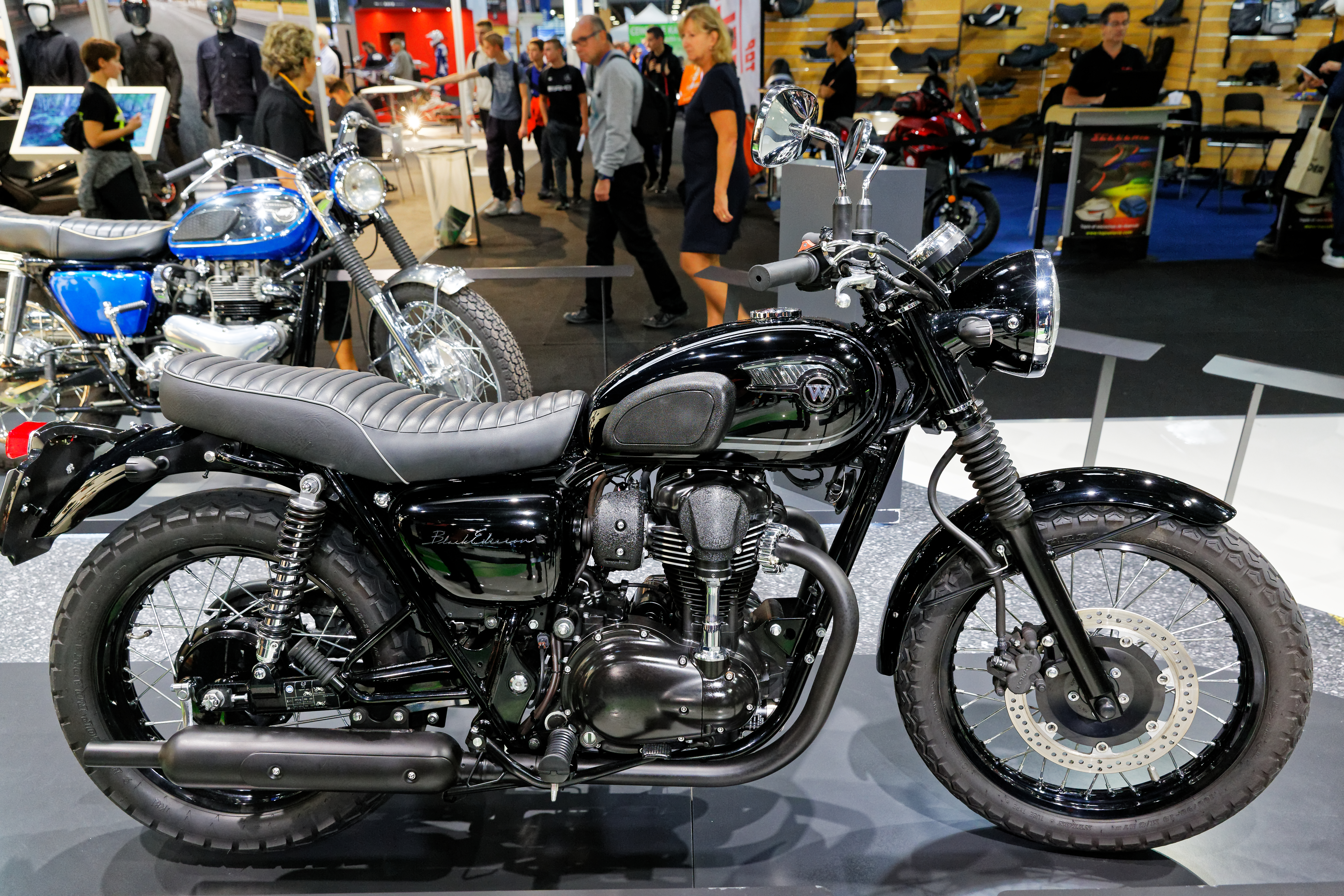
- 2018 Kawasaki W800
- Manufacturer: Kawasaki
- Production: 2011–2016; 2019–present
- Predecessor: W650
- Class: Standard
- Engine: 773 cc (47 cu in) 4-stroke, parallel-twin
- Bore / stroke: 77 mm × 83 mm (3.03 in × 3.27 in)
- Compression ratio: 8.4:1
- Power: 48 PS (35 kW; 47 hp) @ 6,500 rpm (claimed)
- Torque: 60 N⋅m (44 lb⋅ft) @ 2,500 rpm (claimed)
- Transmission: 5-speed, chain-drive
- Frame type: Double-cradle, high-tensile steel
- Suspension: Front: 39 mm telescopic forks Rear: Dual shock absorbers
- Brakes: Front: single 300 mm disc, twin-piston calliper Rear: 160 mm drum
- Tyres: Front: 100/90-19; Rear: 130/80-18
- Rake, trail: 27° / 108 mm
- Wheelbase: 1,465 mm (57.7 in)
- Dimensions: L: 2,180 mm (86 in); W: 790 mm (31 in); H: 1,075 mm (42.3 in)
- Seat height: 790 mm (31 in)
- Fuel capacity: 14 litres (3.1 imp gal; 3.7 US gal)
- Fuel consumption: 45–55 mpg_{‑imp} (6.3–5.1 L/100 km; 37–46 mpg_{‑US})
- Related: W1

The Kawasaki W800 is a parallel twin motorcycle manufactured and marketed by Kawasaki from 2011 to 2016, and then since 2019. The W800 is a retro style model that emulates the Kawasaki W series, three models that were produced from 1967 to 1975, and which in turn were based on the British BSA A7. It replaced the W650, which was produced from 1999 to 2007. The W800 has an air-cooled, 773 cc (47 cu in) 360° parallel-twin, four-stroke engine, with shaft and bevel gear driven overhead cam. The carbureted W650 was discontinued because it could not meet emissions regulations. Unlike the W650, the W800 is fuel injected and does not have a kickstart.

The retro style includes a highly polished, gloss-painted and pinstriped fuel tank, as well as a ribbed saddle, wire wheels and a special W-logo on both sides of the tank, which refers to the W1-model. Besides the regular W800 model there is the W800 Special Edition. In 2012 the S.E. has gold-anodised wheelrims, twin black exhausts, and a black engine. For both models, there is the Café Style option, with a front cowl, and a cafe racer-inspired seat.

Kevin Ash wrote, "The performance feels distinctly retro too, but in a good way, as the W800 purrs along. The sound is friendly and mellow and the engine pulls well enough not to feel breathless, as the W650 could".
