= Kawasaki Estrella =

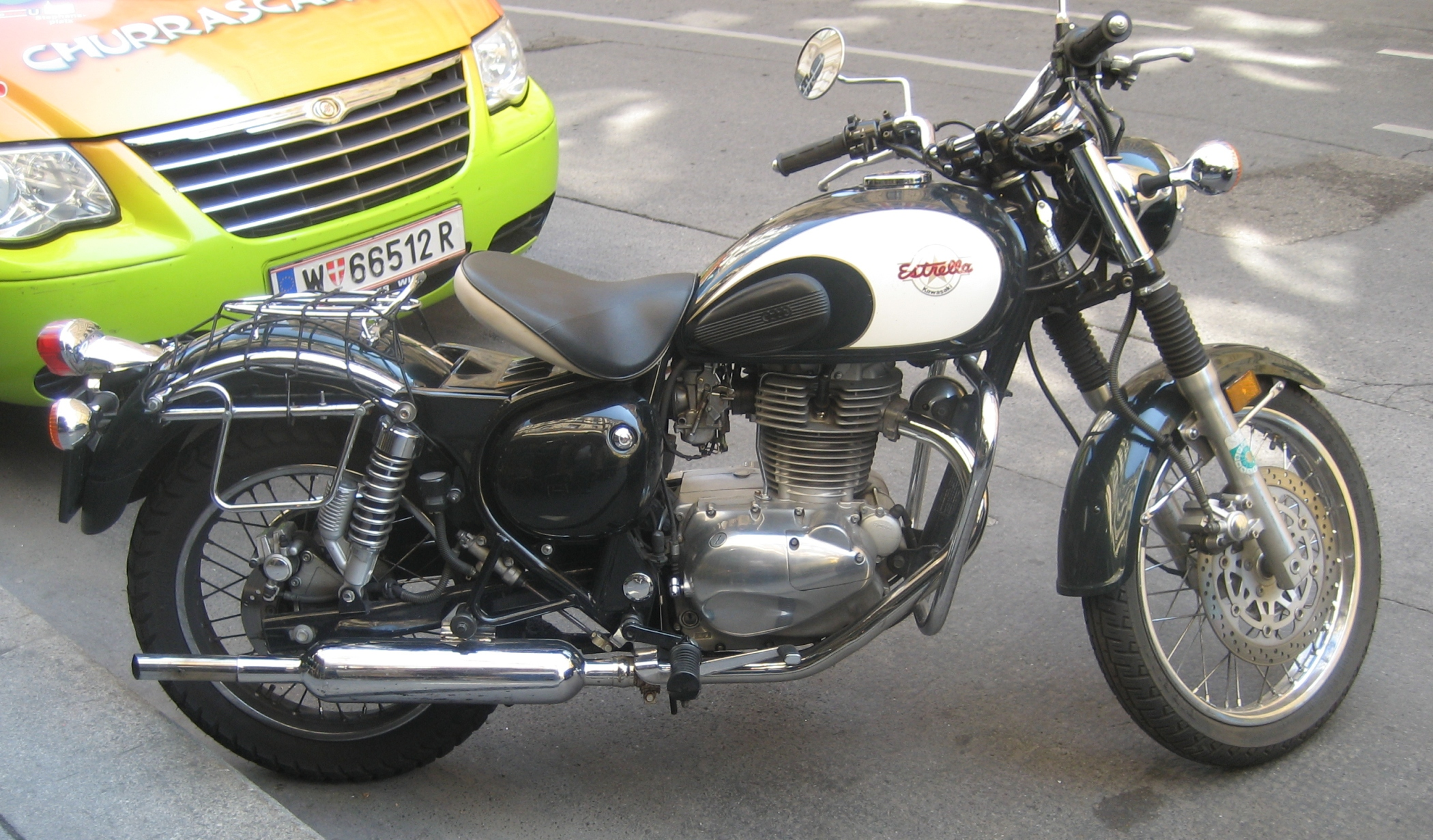
- Manufacturer: Kawasaki Motors
- Also called: Kawasaki W250 (since 2017)
- Parent company: Kawasaki Heavy Industries
- Production: 1992–present
- Class: Standard
- Engine: 249 cc (15 cu in)
- Power: 17 HP
- Torque: 19N m (2.0kg-m) @ 6000 rpm
- Transmission: chain
- Wheelbase: 1400 mm (55.1 in)
- Dimensions: L: 2075 mm (81.7 in); W: 775 mm (30.5 in); H: 1035 mm (40.7 in)
- Fuel capacity: 13 litres (3.4 US gallons)

The Kawasaki Estrella (called W250 since 2017) is a 249 cc retro standard motorcycle made by Kawasaki since 1992. It has only been available in European and Asian markets. As of 2012, it is only available in Japan. It is a smaller-engine version of the Kawasaki W series. It is popularly used as a bike for modifications and customizations due to its affordable price and classic cafe racer style.

The design of the single-seater model of Kawasaki Estrella is very similar to the Kawasaki model SG 250 1964. This motorcycle was based on a 250-cc engine of the motorcycle manufacturer Meguro, which was taken over by Kawasaki and built including copies of British BSA engines. The design of the two-seater model Gold Star Clubman DBD34 recalls the BSA motorcycle from the 1960s.
