= Kawasaki W650 =

Retro-standard motorcycle

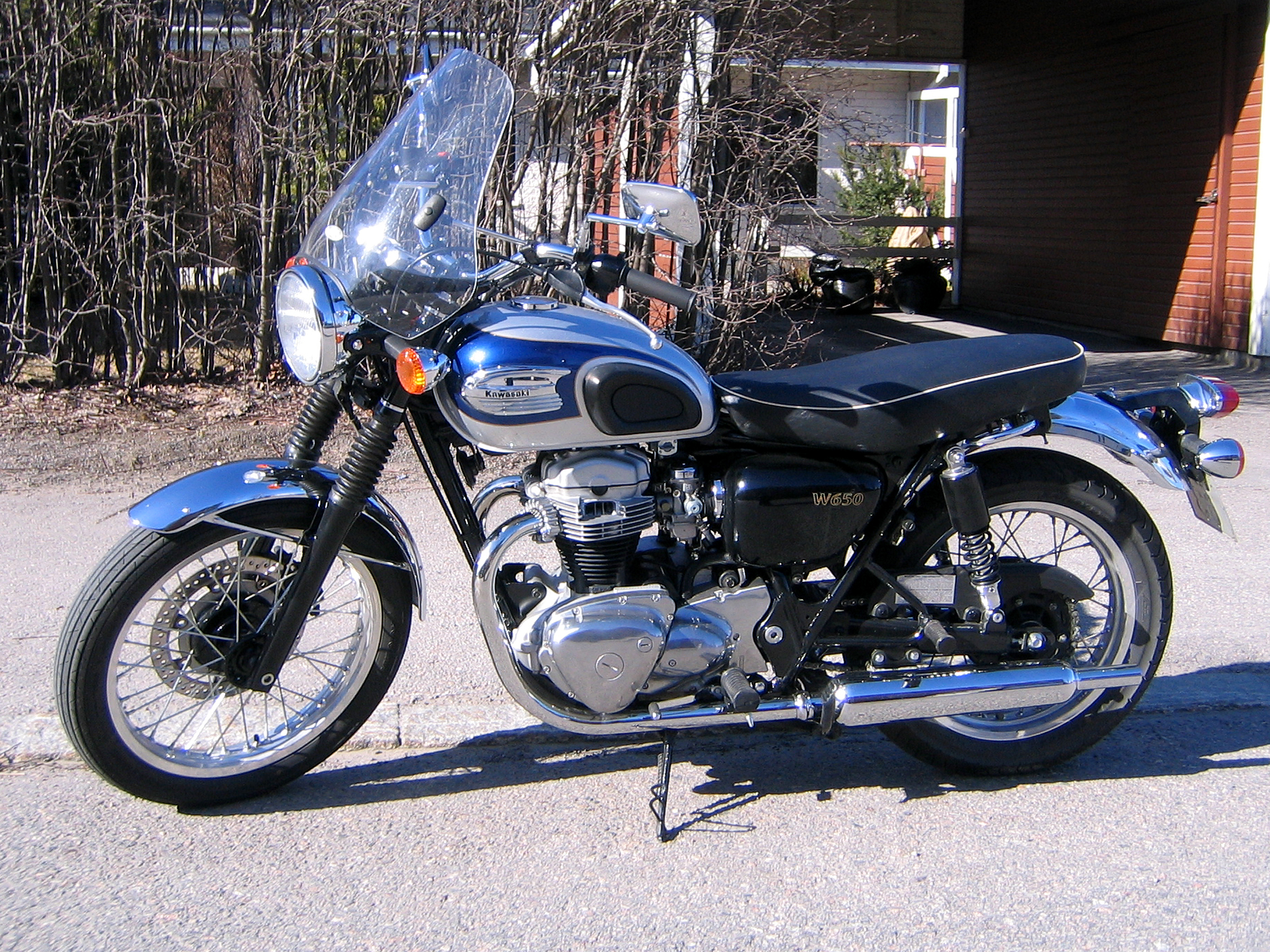
- 2000 W650 in "Galaxy Silver/Luminous Boralis Blue"
- Manufacturer: Kawasaki
- Also called: Kawasaki W400
- Production: 1999–2007
- Successor: W800
- Class: Standard
- Engine: 399 cc (24 cu in) 4-stroke, 8-valve, air-cooled, SOHC, parallel-twin; 676 cc (41 cu in) 4-stroke, 8-valve, air-cooled, SOHC, parallel-twin
- Bore / stroke: 72 mm x 80 mm
- Compression ratio: 8.6:1-8.7:1
- Top speed: 180 km/h (110 mph)
- Power: 50 PS (37 kW; 49 hp) at 7,000 rpm
- Transmission: 5-speed, chain
- Rake, trail: 24° 108 mm (4.3 in)
- Wheelbase: 1,455 mm (57.3 in)
- Dimensions: L: 2,180 mm (86 in); W: 790 mm (31 in); H: 1,075 mm (42.3 in)
- Seat height: 790–800 mm (31.1–31.5 in)
- Weight: 430 lb (195.0 kg) (dry); 476 lb (215.9 kg) (wet)
- Fuel capacity: 15 L (3.3 imp gal; 4.0 US gal)

The Kawasaki W650 is a retro standard motorcycle marketed by Kawasaki for model years 1999–2007. It was superseded by the Kawasaki W800.

The "W" in "W650" refers to Kawasaki's W1, W2 and W3 models, manufactured between 1967 and 1975. The "650" refers to the engine displacement.

In 1999, superseding the Zephyr series, Kawasaki introduced the W650, resembling British motorcycles of the early 1960s, notably the Triumph Bonneville. The engines of the British motorcycles used pushrods, but the W650 has an overhead camshaft, driven by bevel gears, in the same way as 1970s Ducati singles and V-twins. The W650 had no connection to Triumphs. They directly descended, with modifications, from the BSA 650.

The W650 has a long-stroke engine of 72 mm bore x 80 mm stroke with an anti-vibration balance shaft and modern electronics. In 2006 Kawasaki added a short-stroke W400 model, in Japan. Kawasaki simply combined the same 72 mm bore with a short-throw crankshaft to give a 49 mm stroke and 399 cc (24 cu in) displacement. The W400 produces 29 PS (21 kW; 29 hp) and 3.0 kg⋅m (29 N⋅m; 22 lb⋅ft).

In the United States and Canada, the W650 was imported for model years 2000–2001. With weak US and Canadian sales and the introduction of the competing "retro" Bonneville by Triumph, Kawasaki concentrated sales in Europe and Japan.

Production of the W400 and W650, unable to meet new emissions standards, ended in 2008. In 2010, the 50 hp (37 kW) W650 was succeeded by the W800, which had a displacement increase to 773 cc (47 cu in) and fuel injection.

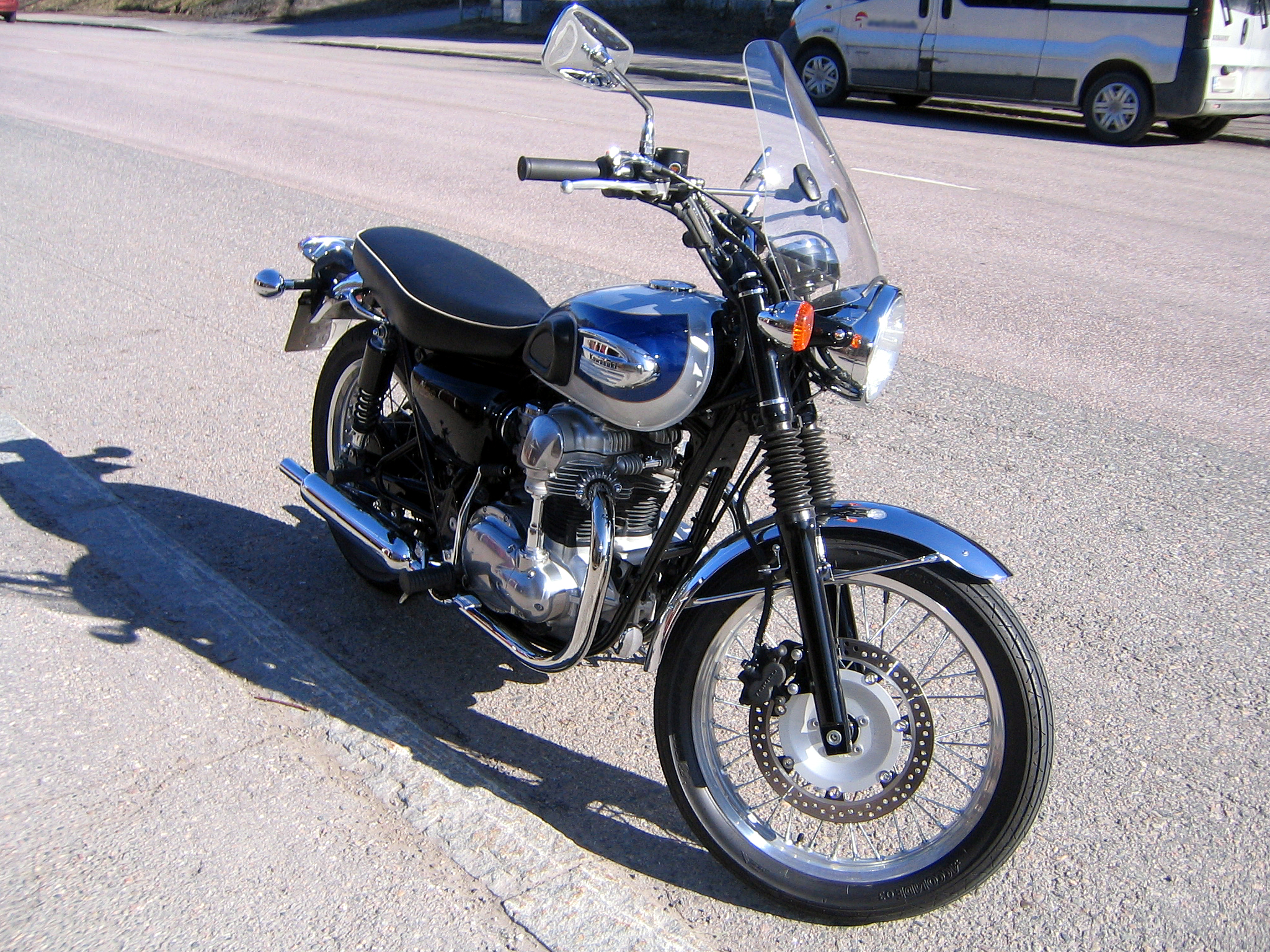
The right side reveals the Ducati-Desmo-style cover for the bevel drive system that operates the camshaft.

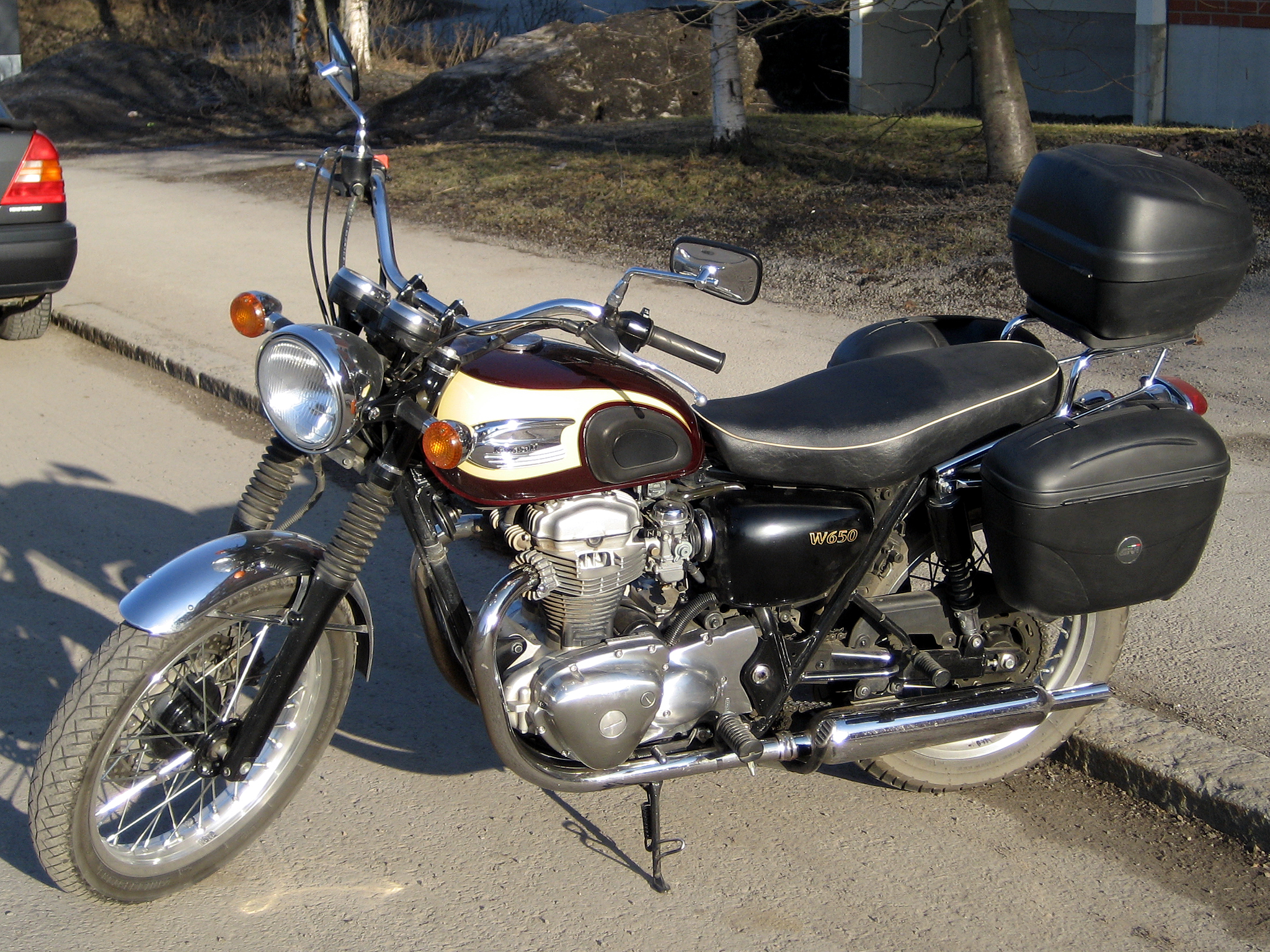
1999 W650

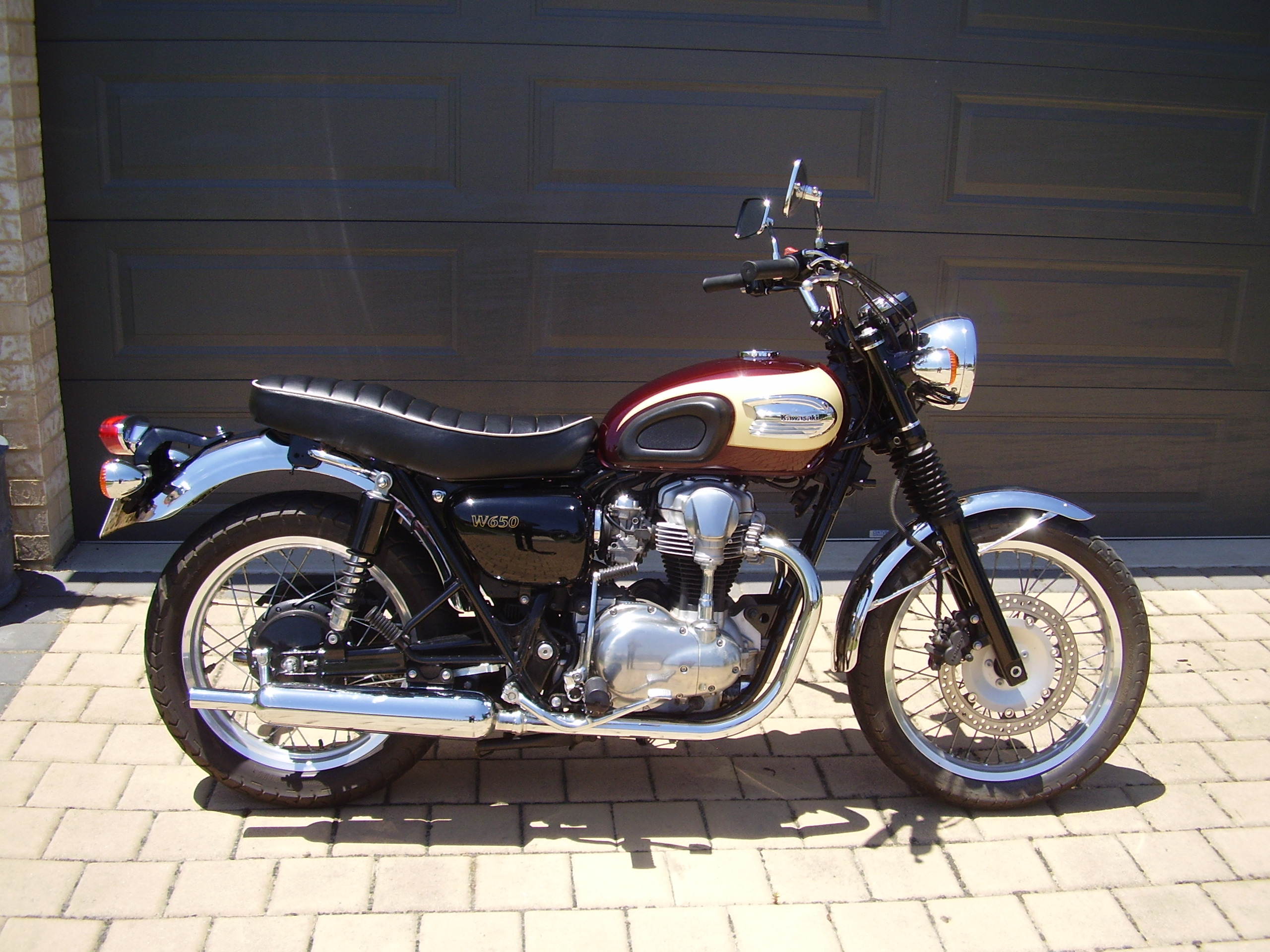
2000 W650
