= Kawasaki Motors =

Motor vehicle manufacturing subsidiary of Kawasaki Heavy Industries

- Native name: カワサキモータース株式会社
- Romanized name: Kawasaki Mōtāsu Kabushikigaisha
- Type: Subsidiary
- Industry: Automotive
- Predecessor: Kawasaki Heavy Industries Motorcycle & Engine Company
- Founded: February 12, 1953; 73 years ago
- Headquarters: 1-1, Kawasaki-cho, Akashi, Hyōgo Prefecture, Japan
- Key people: Hiroshi Ito (President & CEO)
- Products: Motorcycles, ATVs, utility vehicles, personal watercraft, general-purpose petrol engines
- Parent: Kawasaki Heavy Industries
- Subsidiaries: Autopolis Co., Ltd.
- Website: global-kawasaki-motors.com

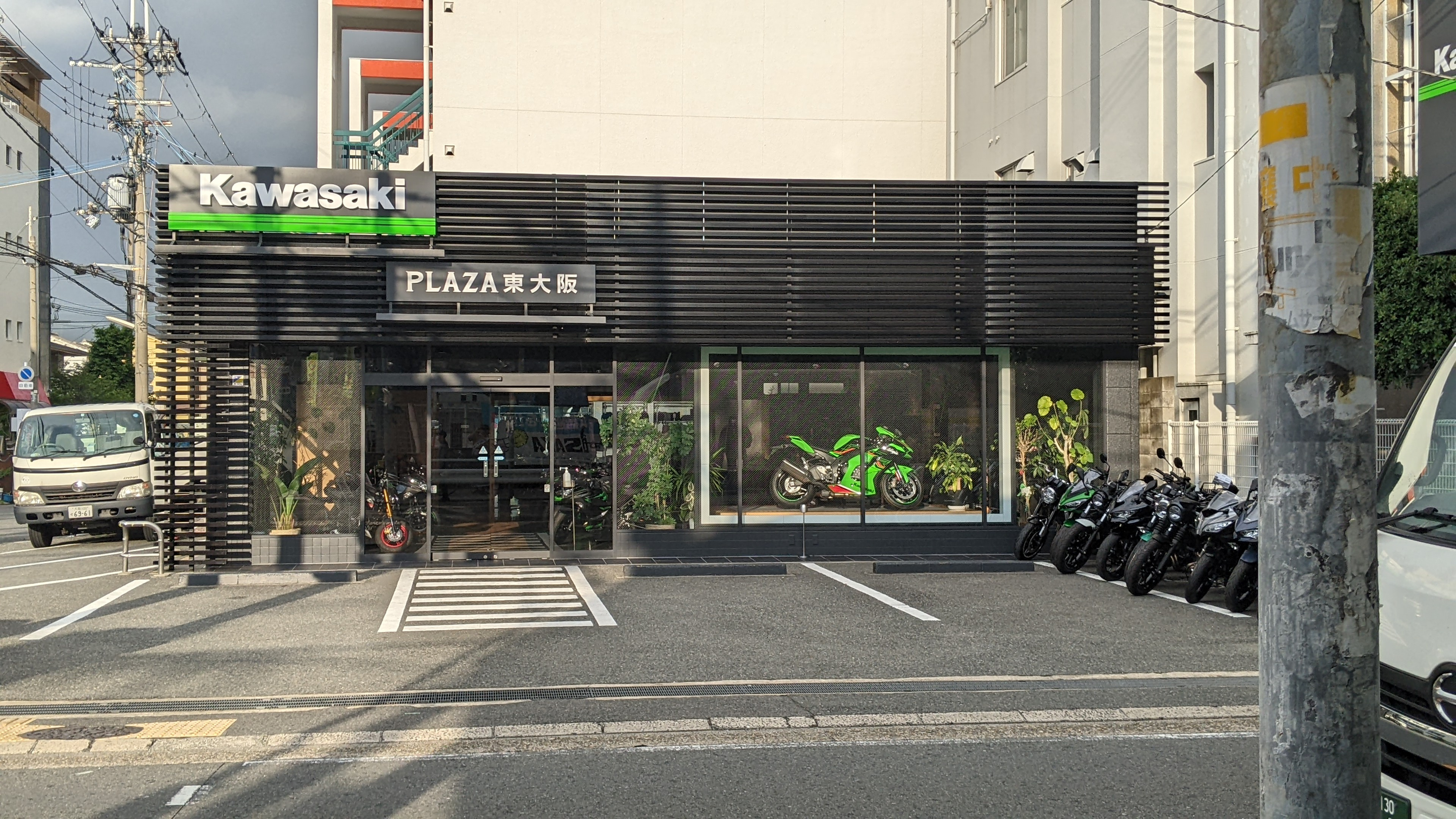
Kawasaki dealership in Japan

Kawasaki Motors, Ltd. (カワサキモータース株式会社, Kawasaki Mōtāsu Kabushikigaisha) is a Japanese mobility manufacturer that produces motorcycles, all-terrain vehicles, utility vehicles, watercraft, outboard motors, and other electric products. It derives its origins from Kawasaki Aerospace Systems, a subsidiary of Kawasaki Heavy Industries, and is rooted in the motorcycle, boat, and engine businesses. In 1953, they began manufacturing engines for motorcycles and have since produced products such as the Mach and Ninja series in motorcycles and the Jet Ski, which has become a generic term for personal watercraft. Until 2021, it was a division of Kawasaki Heavy Industries, known as the Kawasaki Aerospace Company (川策重工業汎用機カンパニー) and later the Kawasaki Motorcycle & Engine Company (川崎重工業モーターサイクル&エンジンカンパニー). In 2021, it was separated as Kawasaki Motors, Ltd, a wholly owned subsidiary of Kawasaki Heavy Industries.

== History ==
Kawasaki Aircraft initially manufactured motorcycles under the Meguro name, having bought an ailing motorcycle manufacturer, Meguro Manufacturing with whom they had been in partnership. This eventually became Kawasaki Motor Sales. Some early motorcycles display an emblem with "Kawasaki Aircraft" on the fuel tank.

During 1962, Kawasaki engineers were developing a four-stroke engine for small cars. Then some of the engineers transferred to the Meguro factory to work on the Meguro K1 and the SG, a single cylinder 250 cc OHV. In 1963, Kawasaki and Meguro merged to form Kawasaki Motorcycle Co., Ltd. From 1962 through 1967, Kawasaki motorcycles used an emblem which can be described as a flag within a wing.

Work continued on the Meguro K1, a copy of the BSA A7 500 cc vertical twin and on the W1. The K2 was exported to the U.S. for a test in response to the expanding American market for four-stroke motorcycles. At first it was rejected for a lack of power. By the mid-1960s, Kawasaki was finally exporting a moderate number of motorcycles. The Kawasaki H1 Mach III in 1968, along with several enduro-styled motorcycles to compete with Yamaha, Suzuki and Honda, increased sales of Kawasaki units.

1974 saw the establishment of a Kawasaki assembly facility in Lincoln, Nebraska, US, named the American Kawasaki Motors Corporation (KMC), to complete Japan-produced components into finished motorcycles for the North American market.

Kawasaki's engines division, housed in a single office complex in Grand Rapids, Michigan, consolidates research and development projects for engines.

== Motorcycles ==
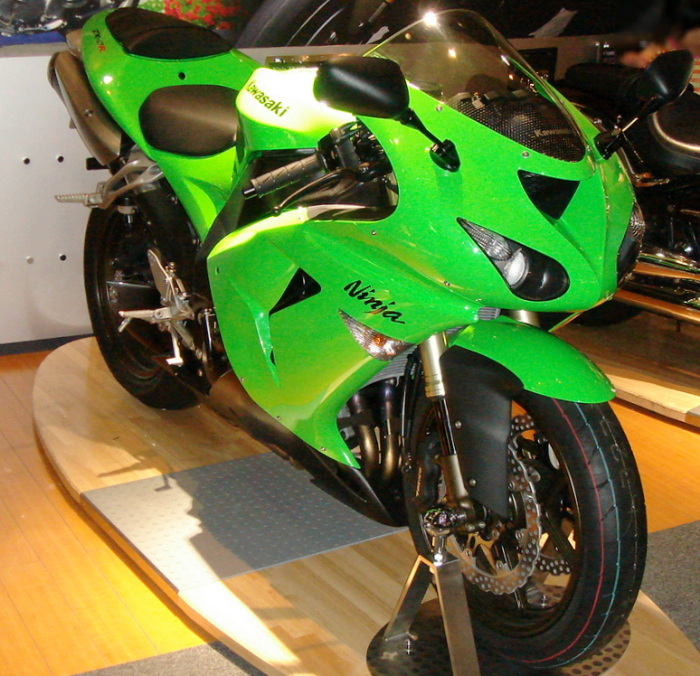
2006 Kawasaki Ninja ZX-10R

Kawasaki's Aircraft Company began the development of a motorcycle engine in 1949. The development was completed in 1952 and mass production started in 1953. The engine was an air-cooled, 148 cc, OHV, four-stroke single cylinder with a maximum power of 4 PS (2.9 kW; 3.9 hp) at 4,000 rpm. In 1954, the first complete Kawasaki Motorcycle was produced under the name of Meihatsu, a subsidiary of Kawasaki Aircraft. In 1960, Kawasaki completed construction of a factory dedicated exclusively to motorcycle production and bought Meguro Motorcycles.

== All-terrain vehicles and utility vehicles ==
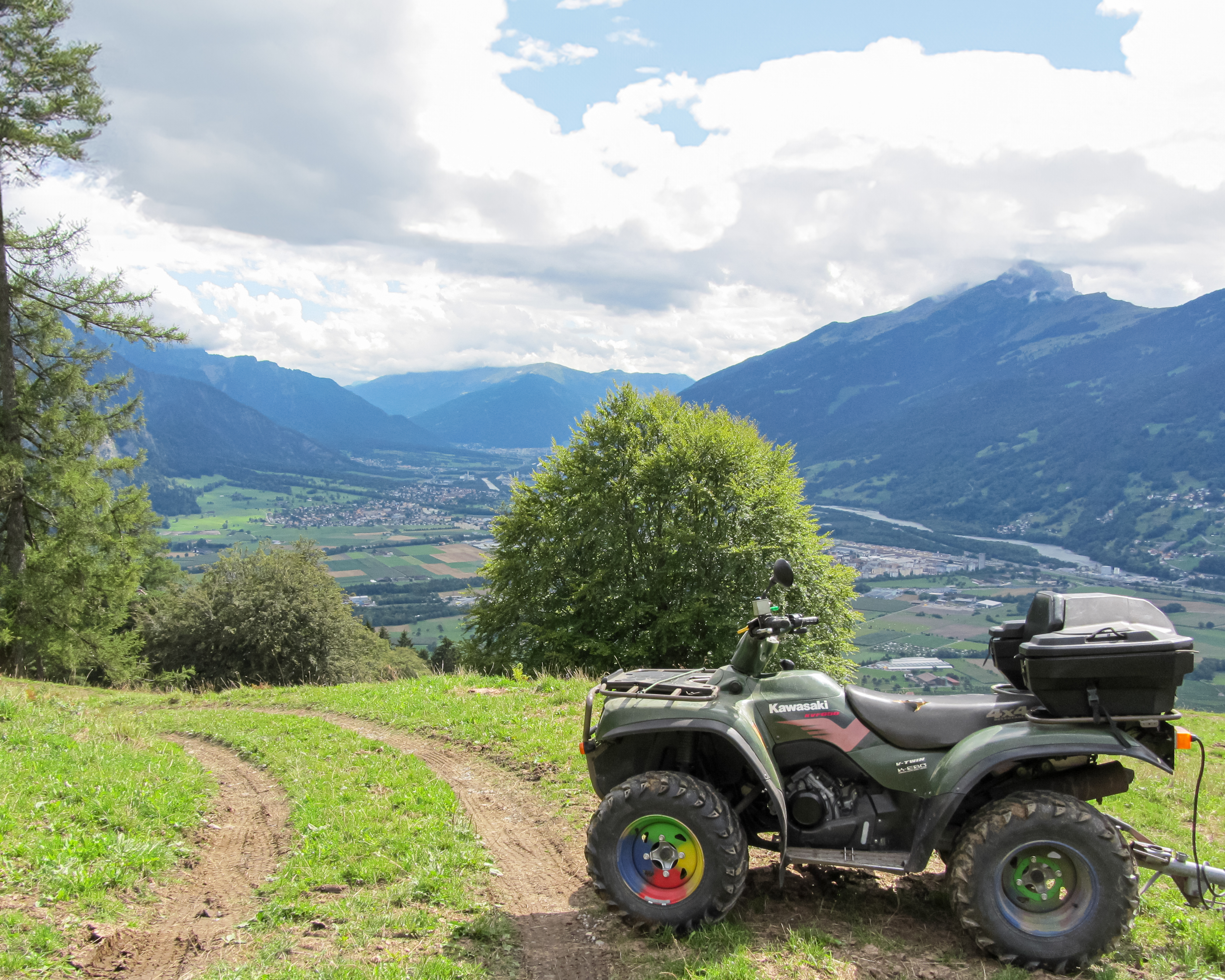
Kawasaki KVF650 4x4 in Switzerland

Kawasaki's first ATV was the three-wheeled KLT200, which debuted in 1981. Its first four-wheel ATV, the Bayou 185, was introduced in 1985 and in 1989, its first model with four-wheel-drive, the Bayou 300 4x4. Today, Kawasaki's ATV line-up includes a wide range of recreational and utility ATVs.

Kawasaki's MULE (Multi-Use Light Equipment) utility vehicle combines an ATV with a pick-up truck. The first MULE was produced in 1988. Kawasaki now calls their utility vehicles "side-by-side" vehicles.

== Watercraft ==
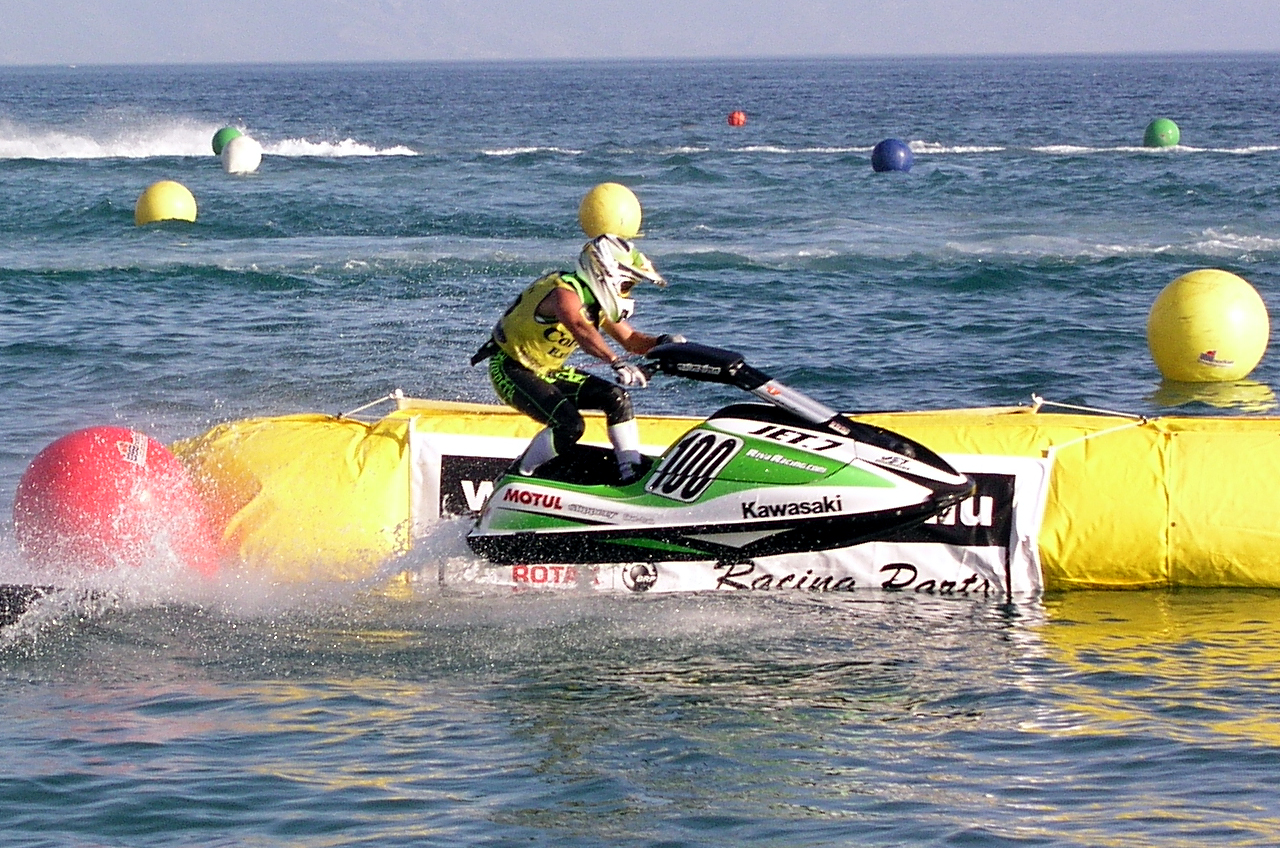
Kawasaki Jet Ski

In 1973, Kawasaki introduced a limited production of stand-up models as designed by the recognized inventor of jet skis, Clayton Jacobson II. In 1976, Kawasaki then began mass production of the JS400-A. JS400s came with 400 cc two-stroke engines and hulls based upon the previous limited release models. It became the harbinger of the success Jet-Skis would see in the market up through the 1990s. In 1986 Kawasaki broadened the world of Jet Skis by introducing a two-person model with lean-in "sport" style handling and a 650 cc engine, dubbed the Kawasaki X2. Then in 1989, they introduced their first two-passenger "sit-down" model, the Tandem Sport (TS) with a step-through seating area.

In 2003, Kawasaki celebrated the Jet Ski brand by releasing a special 30th anniversary edition of its current stand-up model, the SX-R, which has seen a revival of interest in stand-up jetskiing. The X-2 has also been updated, based on the SX-R platform and re-released in Japan. Kawasaki continues to produce three models of sit-downs, including many four-stroke models. The four stroke engines have come on since the late 1990s; with the help of superchargers and the like the engines can output up to 300 horsepower (220 kW) as seen in the Kawasaki Ultra 300x.

Jet Ski is the brand name of personal watercraft manufactured by Kawasaki. The name, however, has become a Generic trademark for any type of personal watercraft.

== Racing ==
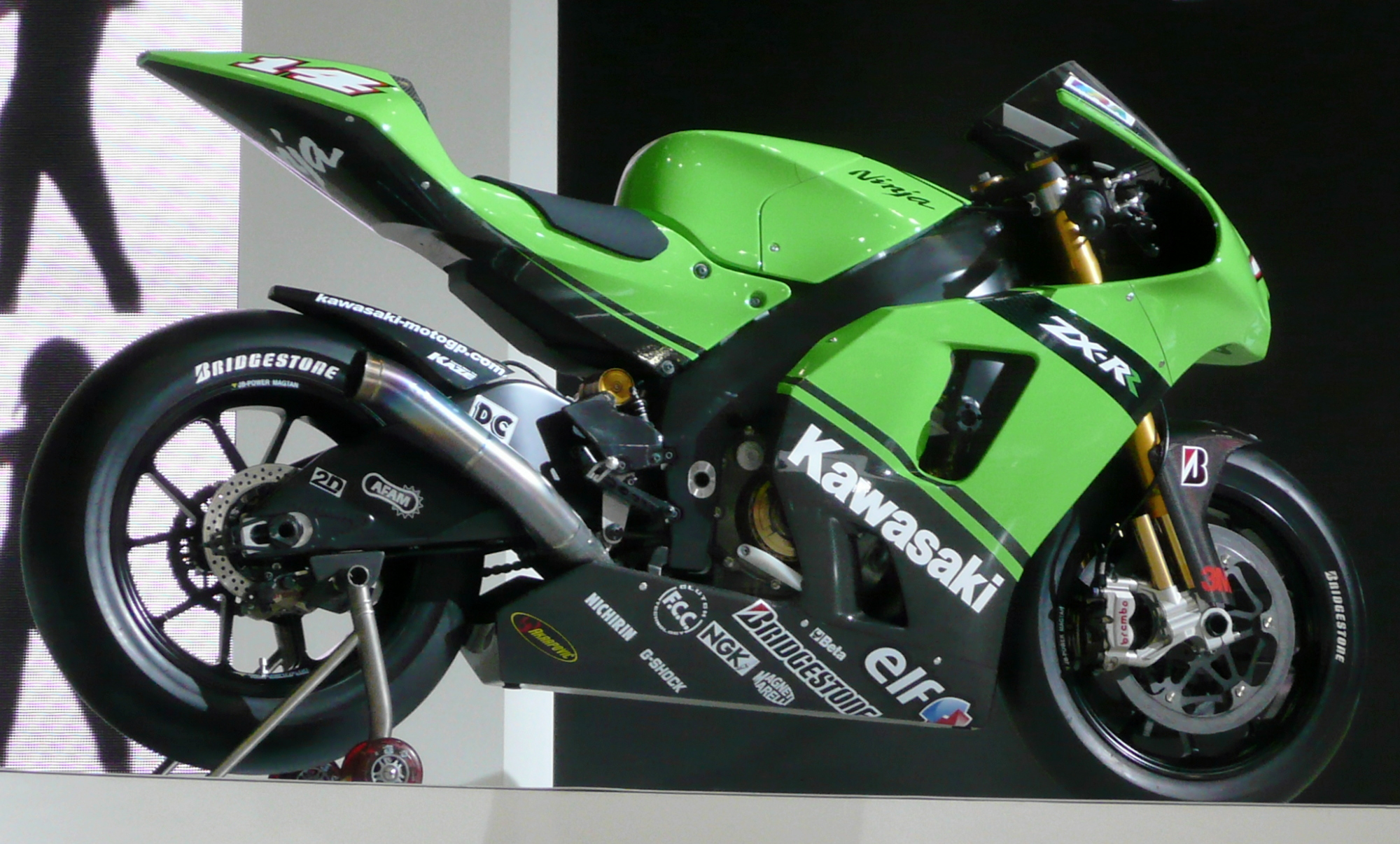
2007 Kawasaki Ninja ZX-RR

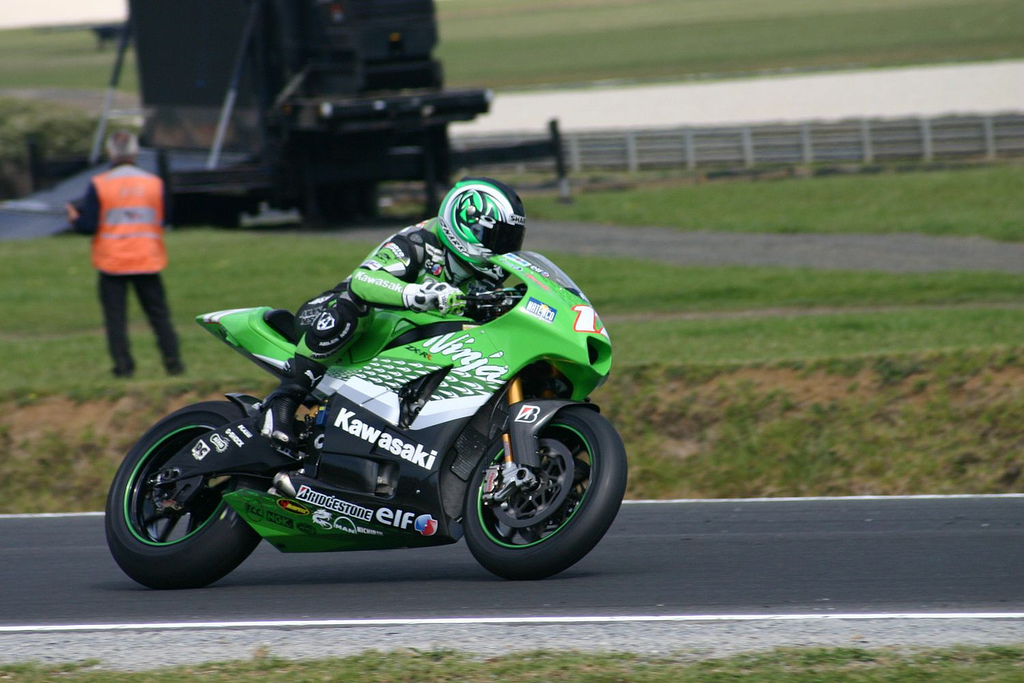
Kawasaki Ninja ZX-RR

Kawasaki's traditional racing colour is green. Many Kawasaki racing teams are called Team Green. The "Monster Energy Kawasaki Team Green" provides a support program developing amateur motocross racers.

=== Grand Prix, MotoGP ===
Kawasaki's first title was with Dave Simmonds in 1969 when they won the 125 cc World Championship. Kawasaki dominated the 250 cc and 350 cc grand prix classes from 1978 to 1982 winning four titles in each category.

With the introduction of the four-stroke engines into MotoGP in 2002, Kawasaki decided to take part in the new MotoGP World Championship. Kawasaki entered the championship in 2003 with 250 cc Grand Prix racer Harald Eckl's Team Eckl.

In 2003, the Kawasaki Racing Team was formed after Kawasaki had developed their new 990cc ZX-RR bike throughout 2002 and raced it in the last three races of the 2002 MotoGP season. The racing activities were managed by Harald Eckl's team based in Germany. It was not until 2004 that Kawasaki had two riders - Alex Hofmann and Shinya Nakano, who raced for the entire season. Nakano placed 3rd in Japan that year achieving Kawasaki's first podium finish in MotoGP.

In 2007, Kawasaki split from Harald Eckl because of Eckl's involvement with a competitor's MotoGP activities, which forced Kawasaki to terminate the relationship immediately. Kawasaki formed Kawasaki Motors Racing, a European subsidiary of Kawasaki Heavy Industries responsible for managing the racing activities of the MotoGP team and any other motorcycle racing activities Kawasaki may enter in the future. For the first time since Kawasaki returned to the premier class of motorcycle racing, the team became a complete 'in house' factory team.

On January 9, 2009, Kawasaki announced it had decided to "... suspend its MotoGP racing activities from 2009 season onward and reallocate management resources more efficiently". The company stated that it will continue racing activities using mass-produced motorcycles as well as supporting general race oriented consumers.

- Grand Prix motorcycle racing

Year	Champion		
Year	350 cc	250 cc	125 cc
1982	(West Germany) Anton Mang		
1981	(West Germany) Anton Mang	(West Germany) Anton Mang	
1980		(West Germany) Anton Mang	
1979	(Union of South Africa) Kork Ballington	(Union of South Africa) Kork Ballington	
1978	(Union of South Africa) Kork Ballington	(Union of South Africa) Kork Ballington	
1969			(United Kingdom) Dave Simmonds

=== Superbike ===
Kawasaki's involvement in the Superbike World Championship started in 1990 with the US-based Team Muzzy Kawasaki, which managed the superbike activities until 1996. Between 1997 and 2002, Kawasaki gave factory backing to the Harald Eckl's team, based in Germany, while Muzzy focused on the AMA Superbike domestic series. From 2003 to 2008, only privateer teams like Bertocchi and PSG-1 entered the world championship, with small factory support. In 2009, Kawasaki officially returned to SBK with Paul Bird Motorsport, but after three seasons, in 2012, Kawasaki switched the factory support to the Spanish-based Provec Racing team.

Kawasaki has won several superbike racing championships. They won the rider's Superbike World Championship in 1993 with Scott Russell, two decades later in 2013 with Tom Sykes, and six times consecutively in 2015, 2016, 2017, 2018, 2019, and 2020 with Jonathan Rea. The manufacturer has also claimed nine AMA Superbike Championships with riders such as Reg Pridmore, Eddie Lawson, Wayne Rainey, Scott Russell, and Doug Chandler. During the 1990s, they also dominated the Endurance World Championship.

- Superbike World Championship

Year	Champion
1993	(United States) Scott Russell
2013	(United Kingdom) Tom Sykes
2015	(United Kingdom) Jonathan Rea
2016	(United Kingdom) Jonathan Rea
2017	(United Kingdom) Jonathan Rea
2018	(United Kingdom) Jonathan Rea
2019	(United Kingdom) Jonathan Rea
2020	(United Kingdom) Jonathan Rea

- AMA Superbike Championship

Year	Champion
1977	(United Kingdom) Reg Pridmore
1978	(United Kingdom) Reg Pridmore
1981	(United States) Eddie Lawson
1982	(United States) Eddie Lawson
1983	(United States) Wayne Rainey
1990	(United States) Doug Chandler
1992	(United States) Scott Russell
1996	(United States) Doug Chandler
1997	(United States) Doug Chandler

- Endurance World Championship

Year	Champion
1981	(France) Jean Lafond (France) Raymond Roche
1982	(France) Jean-Claude Chemarin (Switzerland) Jacques Cornu
1991	(France) Alex Vieira
1992	(United Kingdom) Terry Rymer (United Kingdom) Carl Fogarty
1993	(United States) Doug Toland
1994	(France) Adrien Morillas
1996	(United Kingdom) Bryan Morrison

=== Supertwin ===
Kawasaki machinery has been pivotal in the development of Supertwin racing. The racing machines are developed from the Kawasaki 650cc parallel twin commuter bike (ER6-n or ER6-f). The machines are then transformed through development into an 85 bhp race bike with top end speeds in excess of 150 mph.

The KMR Kawasaki Racing Team are one of the leading race teams in the category, whose team members include Ryan Farquhar and Jeremy McWilliams.

- Isle of Man TT Supertwin Race

Year	Champion
2012	(United Kingdom) Ryan Farquhar
2013	(United Kingdom) James Hillier
2014	(United Kingdom) Dean Harrison
2015	(United Kingdom) Ivan Lintin

=== Isle of Man TT ===
Kawasaki has enjoyed numerous successes at the Isle of Man TT Races. The marque has notched up a total of 34 victories which include 3 victories in the Sidecar TT. Notable achievements include Mick Grant's 1975 outright lap record of 109.82 mph (176.74 km/h), finally beating the previous record set by Mike Hailwood and which had stood since 1967.

=== Motocross ===
Riders on Kawasaki motorcycles won races in the British Motocross Championship, Motocross des Nations, AMA Supercross Championship, Sidecarcross and Supermoto.

Championship wins:

- 1995 Stefan Everts, FIM Motocross World Championship (250cc)
- 29 times the AMA Motocross Championship

== See also ==
- Kawasaki Motors Racing
- List of Kawasaki motorcycles
- Team Pro Circuit
