= BSA Rocket Gold Star =

BSA A10 Rocket Gold Star
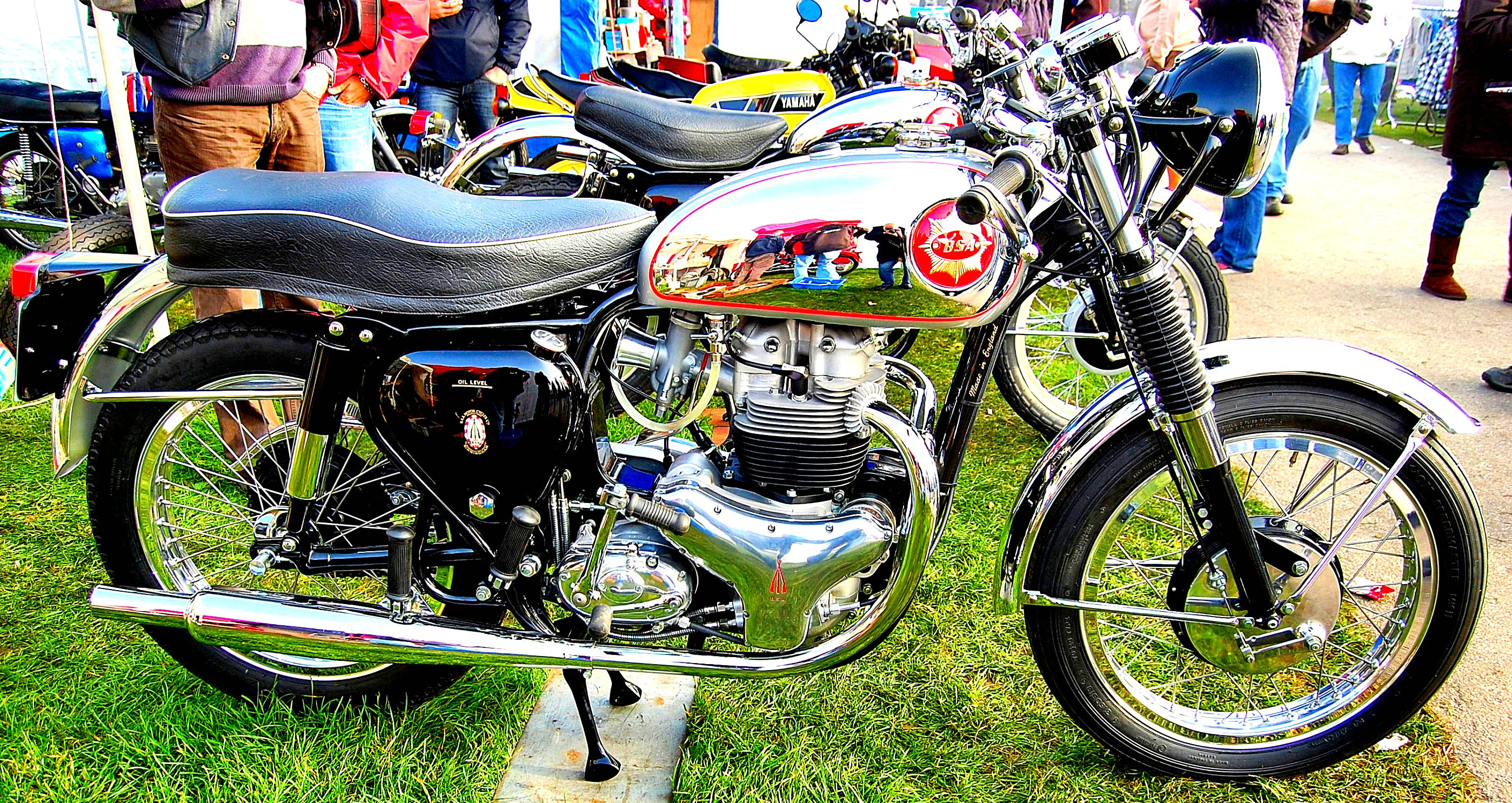
- Manufacturer: BSA Motorcycles Ltd
- Parent company: Birmingham Small Arms Company
- Production: 1962-63
- Predecessor: BSA Super Rocket
- Engine: 646 cc (39.4 cu in) air cooled twin
- Bore / stroke: 70 mm × 84 mm (2.8 in × 3.3 in)
- Power: 50 bhp (37 kW) @ 6,250 rpm with optional equipment
- Transmission: four speed gearbox to chain drive
- Wheelbase: 54.75 in (1,391 mm)
- Dimensions: L: 84 in (2,100 mm)
- Weight: 375 lb (170 kg) (dry)
- Fuel capacity: 3.5 imp gal (16 L; 4.2 US gal)

The BSA Rocket Gold Star (RGS) was a 646 cc (39.4 cu in) air-cooled parallel twin motorcycle produced by Birmingham Small Arms Company (BSA) at Small Heath, Birmingham. Launched in February 1962, it was one of the final range of A10 twins, using a tuned A10 Super Rocket engine in the double-downtube Gold Star frame.

Rocket Gold Star production ended in 1963 due to the development of new unit construction successors, designated as A65 in the 650 cc capacity.

== Development ==
Gold Star tuner and dealer, Eddie Dow, had a customer that wanted to be supplied with a Gold Star fitted with a Super Rocket engine. BSA supplied a Gold Star less engine and a separate Super Rocket engine. Dow assembled the special. The special was well received and the BSA management decided to put the concept into limited production. BSA had previously produced a bike with an A10 engine in a Gold Star frame - the 1957 Spitfire Scrambler. It has been suggested that as both the Gold Star and the A10 were at the end of their production life, and BSA wanted riders to switch to the new unit twins, this was a convenient way to use up the stock of pre-unit parts.

The later (1961–1963) 9:1 compression ratio Super Rocket engine was used with a 357 Spitfire camshaft and a 1 5/32" bore Amal Monobloc carburettor which gave 46 bhp (34 kW) as standard. Options such as an Amal GP2 carburettor, siamesed exhaust pipes and a close-ratio RRT2 gearbox could increase this to 50 bhp (37 kW) – and add 30% to the price. Nine specials were made for export to California and one was fitted with a sidecar by Watsonian for the Earls Court Show in October 1962.

== Production ==
The first pre-production bike was road tested by Motorcycle Sport magazine. The second was used as a TT marshal's bike, although a conrod broke during testing. It was repaired before the racing started. The bike was later loaned to Worcestershire County Constabulary to test.

The Gold Star frame used on the Rocket Gold Star has a frame number prefixed GA10. All other A10s have a frame number prefixed A7, including the 1957 Gold Star framed Spitfire Scrambler. The Gold Star singles required a kink in the bottom run of the frame to clear the oil pump. The kink is not present on the RGS frames.

The total Rocket Gold Star production was 1,584 bikes, of which 272 were off-road scramblers. Most were finished in red, but a few were manufactured in black or silver. The model was also known as the Gold Star Twin.

== Scramblers ==
272 of the model were produced as scramblers. BSA already had a similar scrambler range in the US, the Spitfire Scrambler. (The RGS, Super Rocket and Spitfire Scrambler all had the same specification engine in 1962/3) In 1963 the two model lines were merged and the RGS Scrambler was renamed the Gold Star Spitfire Scrambler in the US.
