= BSA unit twins =

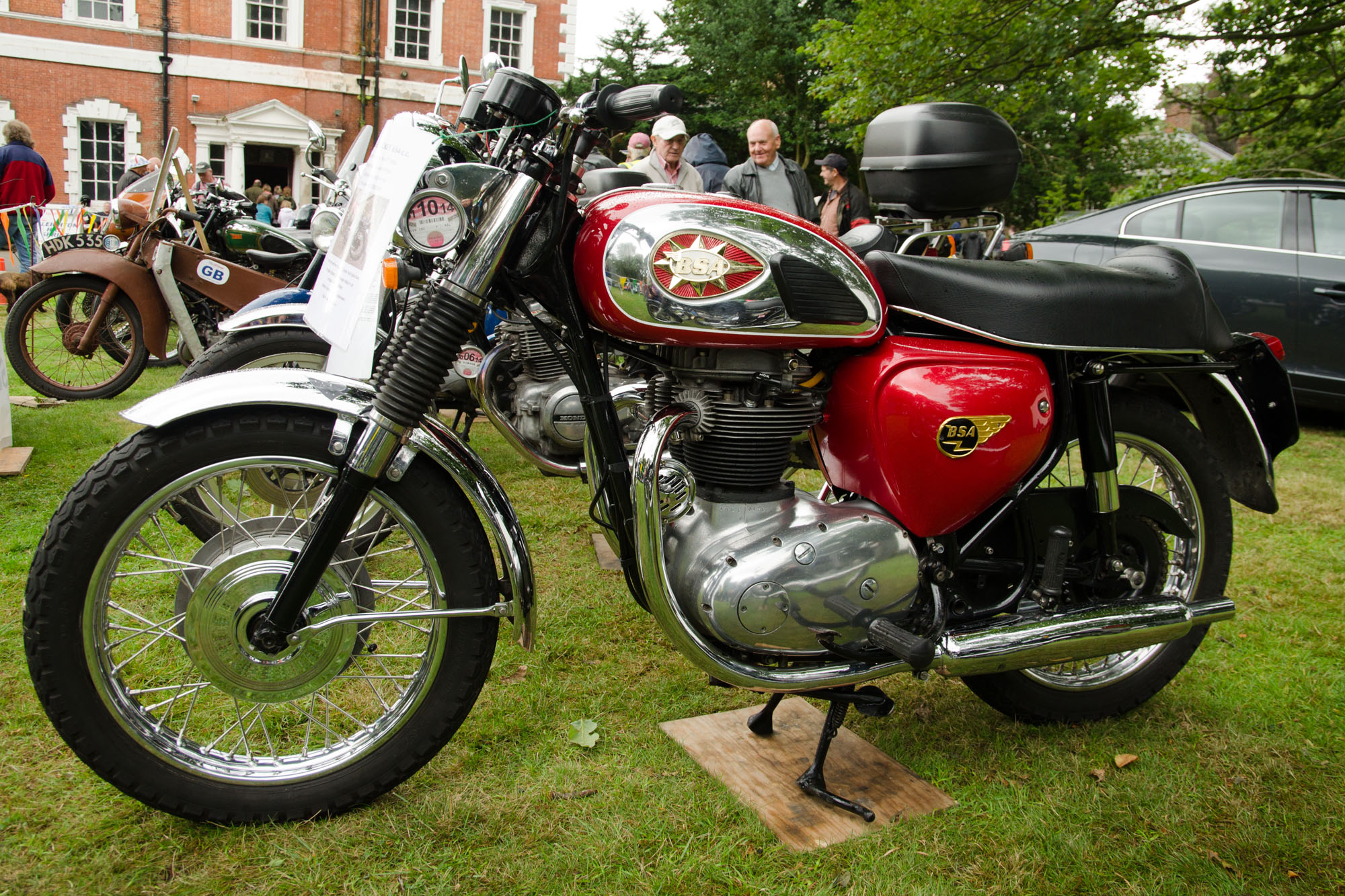
- 1964 BSA A65 Rocket
- Manufacturer: Birmingham Small Arms Company (BSA)
- Production: 1962–1972
- Assembly: Small Heath, Birmingham UK
- Predecessor: BSA A7/A10
- Engine: 500 cc (31 cu in); 654 cc (39.9 cu in); 751 cc (45.8 cu in) air-cooled OHV twin
- Bore / stroke: 500: 65.5 mm × 74 mm (2.58 in × 2.91 in); 650: 75 mm × 74 mm (3.0 in × 2.9 in); 750: 75 mm × 85 mm (3.0 in × 3.3 in)
- Ignition type: Twin coil
- Transmission: Triplex primary chain, 4 speed gearbox
- Frame type: Half-duplex cradle
- Brakes: 7"/8" drum front 7" drum rear 8" 2ls drum 1968 on
- Wheelbase: 54 in (1,400 mm)
- Turning radius: 14 ft (4.3 m)

The BSA unit twins were a range of unit construction twin-cylinder motorcycles made by the Birmingham Small Arms Company (BSA) and aimed at the US market. A range of 500 cc (31 cu in), 650 cc (40 cu in) and 750 cc (46 cu in) twins were produced between 1962 and 1972, but they were really developments of the older pre-unit A7/A10 model range with less weight. The engines had a reputation for vibration, but acceleration was good for the time, to a top speed of 100 miles per hour (160 km/h).

Models for the US generally had smaller petrol tanks and higher wider handlebars than the UK models, and prior to 1966 different model names were used for the two markets.

The 500cc models were discontinued in 1971 when the single cylinder B50 model was introduced.

The BSA Group faced worsening financial difficulties and in 1973 merged with Norton-Villiers. As part of a rationalisation by the newly formed Norton Villiers Triumph, production of BSA motorcycles ceased.

== Design ==
=== Background ===
Precipitated by Lucas's intent to discontinue magnetos and dynamos in favour of alternators, BSA's managing director and general manager, Bob Fearon, took the opportunity to update the engines of BSA's twins and give them a new look. He hoped the new models would succeed in the potentially lucrative, but competitive, US market. Working with chief development engineer Bert Perrigo, he developed the unit construction twins using "The Power Egg" design concept.

=== Engines ===
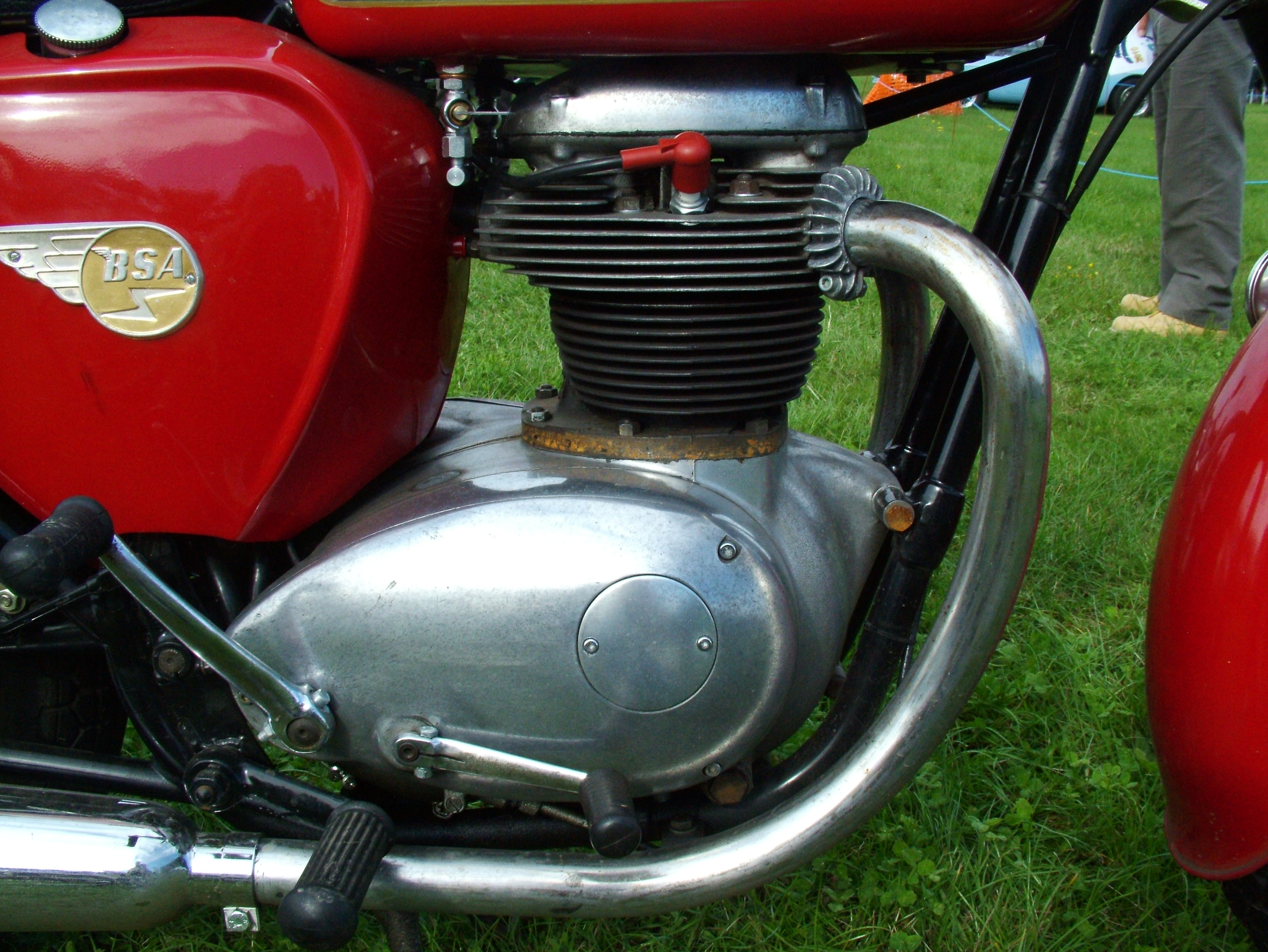
BSA unit construction engine

Pre-unit, known as "non-unit" before unit construction, engines had their roots in history when motorcycle manufacturers bought engines and gearboxes from separate specialists suppliers and mounted them in their own frames. By the late 1950s, most manufacturers made their own engines and gearboxes, and were therefore able to combine the engine and gearbox in an integrated casting, producing a more compact unit.

Perrigo's design team based the new engine on the old A7/A10 engines. To streamline production and keep costs down, as many parts as possible were common between the engine sizes. The 500 and 650 engines shared the same stroke (74 mm (2.9 in)) and cylinder spacing, so the bottom half of the engine could be common to both sizes. (The A7 and A10 models had used different strokes and cylinder spacing, so crankshaft and crankcases were not interchangeable between them). Among the improvements in the new engines were pushrod passages in the cylinder block casting, which reduced the risk of oil leaks, and pillars holding the rocker spindles cast into the head, leading to better valve clearance control. Primary drive was by a triplex chain rather than the single row chain of the previous models and rubber inserts were added to the clutch for a smoother transmission.

Although the older engines used a roller bearing on the drive side of the crankshaft, the new engine used a caged ball bearing. On the timing side a plain bearing was retained but increased in size. This arrangement proved troublesome and the ball bearing was replaced with a roller bearing in 1966.

=== Cycle parts ===
A new frame was designed for the more compact unit construction engine. The frame followed the lines of the frame for the older models; a half-duplex cradle with a single spine. The new frame was all welded. The rear swinging arm was controlled by Girling 3 position adjustable shock absorbers. BSA's own forks were used, which had compression damping only. The front brake was 7" drum on the 500 model and 8" on the 650, although later 500s were fitted with the 8" brake.

The new model had a wheelbase of 54 in (1,400 mm), 2" shorter than its predecessor.

== Overview of models ==
Engine Size	Type	Market	Year											
Engine Size	Type	Market	62	63	64	65	66	67	68	69	70	71	72	73
A50; 500cc	Touring	UK	Star (Note: Also known as Star Twin)				Royal Star							
A50; 500cc	Touring	US	Star	Royal Star (Note: In 1965, this model was only listed in the US West Coast catalog)			Royal Star							
A50; 500cc	Sports	UK				Cyclone Road (Note: In the US, this model was only listed in the US West Coast catalog)								
A50; 500cc	Sports	US			Cyclone Road (Note: Listed as "Cyclone" in 1964 Western US catalog)	Cyclone Road								
A50; 500cc	Production racing	All				Cyclone Clubman								
A50; 500cc	Off-road	UK				Cyclone Competition (Note: In the US, this model was listed as "Cyclone" except in the US West Coast catalog)	Wasp							
A50; 500cc	Off-road	US			Cyclone Competition (Note: Not listed in 1964 Western US catalog)	Cyclone Competition	Wasp							
A50; 500cc	Police	All			Police									
A65; 650cc	Touring	UK	Star											
A65; 650cc	Touring	US	Royal Star											
A65; 650cc	Sports/ Touring	UK			Rocket		Thunderbolt							
A65; 650cc	Sports/ Touring	US			Thunderbolt Rocket		Thunderbolt							
A65; 650cc	Sports	UK				Lightning	Lightning							
A65; 650cc	Sports	US			Lightning Rocket (Note: In the US, this model was listed as "Lightning" except in the US West Coast catalog)		Lightning							
A65; 650cc	Production racing	All				Lightning Clubman								
A65; 650cc	Super Sports	All					Spitfire							
A65; 650cc	Off-road	US			Spitfire Hornet		Hornet							
A65; 650cc	Off-road	All							Firebird Scrambler					
A65; 650cc	Police	All			Police									
T65; 650cc	Touring	US												Thunderbolt (Note: Re-badged Triumph TR6 Trophy)
A70; 750cc	Sports	US										Lightning 75		

== Timeline ==
=== 1962 ===
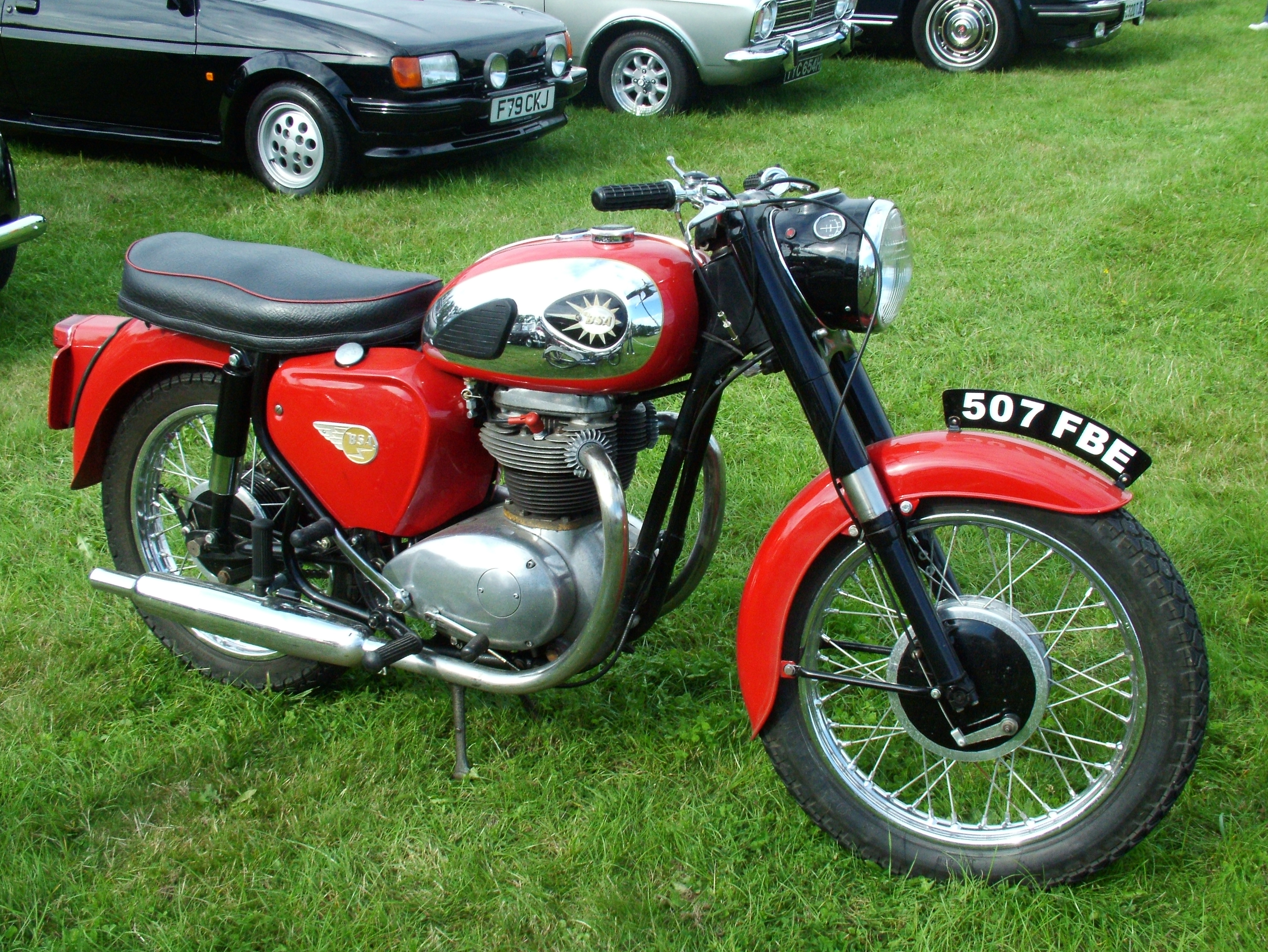
BSA A65 650 Star

500 and 650cc models launched with common cycle parts except the front brake, which was 7" on the 500 and 8" on the 650. The 500cc model was designated "Star" and the 650 "Star" in the UK and "Royal Star" in the US.

=== 1963 ===
The 500 model's name was changed to "Royal Star" in the US.

=== 1964 ===
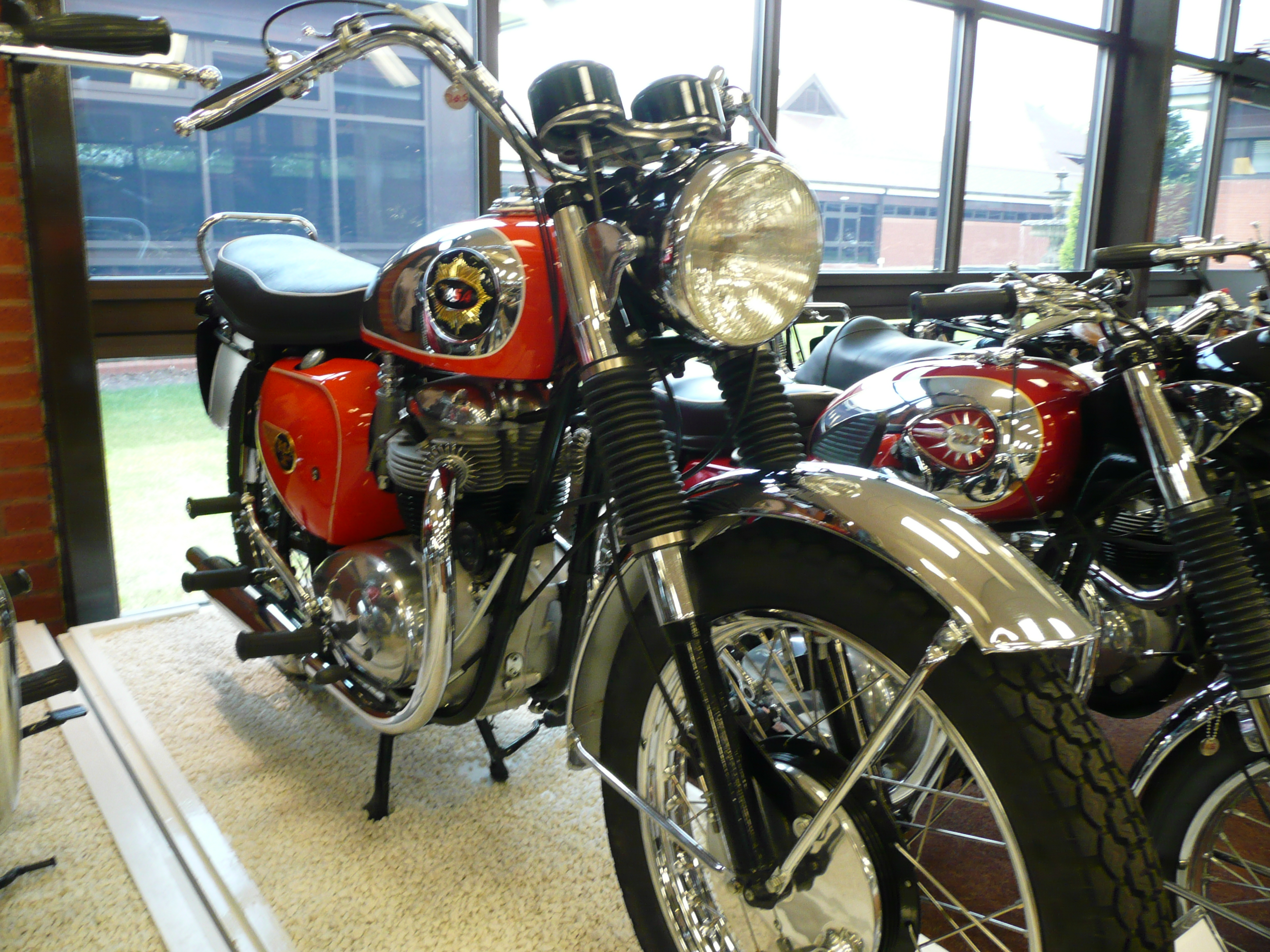
1964 File:BSA Lightning Rocket

Two new 500 models were introduced in the US. Both with twin carburettors and were designated the "Cyclone Road" and the "Cyclone Competition". The road version was fitted with a sports cam and the competition version was devoid of lights and had a higher compression ratio and a race cam. Both had the 8" front brake from the 650.

A new, higher performance 650 model, the "Rocket" in the UK and "Thunderbird Rocket" in the US was introduced. A twin carb version, the "Lightning Rocket" was introduced in the US. These two models replaced the pre-unit "Golden Flash" and "Super Rocket" models that were discontinued this year.

A 650 version of the Cyclone Competition was also introduced in the US and called the "Spitfire Hornet". This was a replacement for the discontinued pre-unit "Spitfire Scrambler".

Police equipped versions of both the 500 and 650 were also introduced.

=== 1965 ===
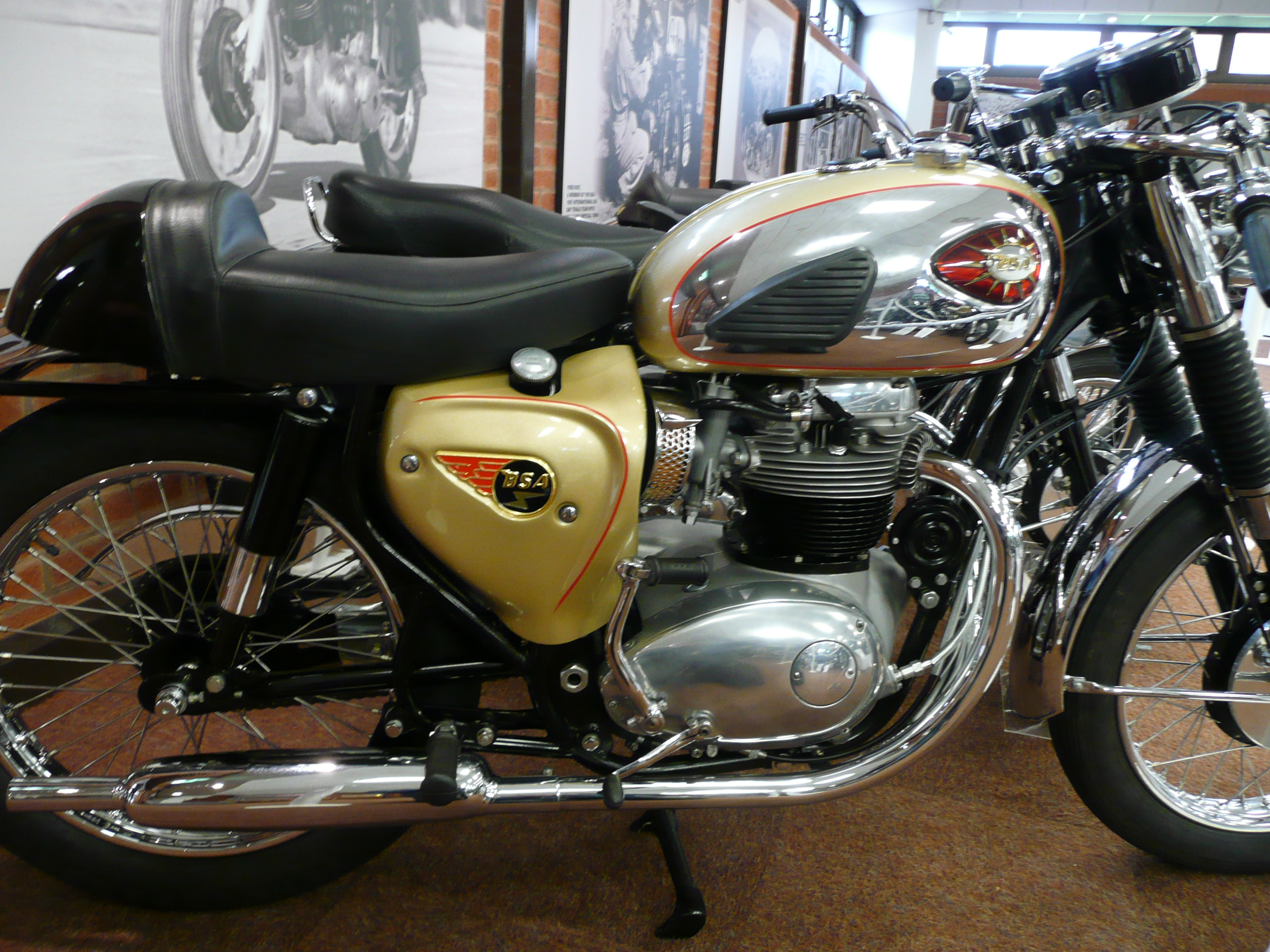
BSA Lightning Clubman

The Cyclone models were made available in the UK as was the Lightning Rocket, although called "Lightning" in the UK. The Lightning Rocket/Lightning has a higher compression ratio than the previous year's model.

A limited edition "Lightning Clubman" was introduced. This featured siamese exhaust, clubman handlebars, rearset footrests and a close-ratio gearbox. It was designed for production racing. A 500cc version was also produced, the "Cyclone Clubman".

Crankshaft main bearings had been unreliable, in an effort to resolve this problem roller bearing were introduced on the drive side and an improved bronze bush on the timing side.

=== 1966 ===
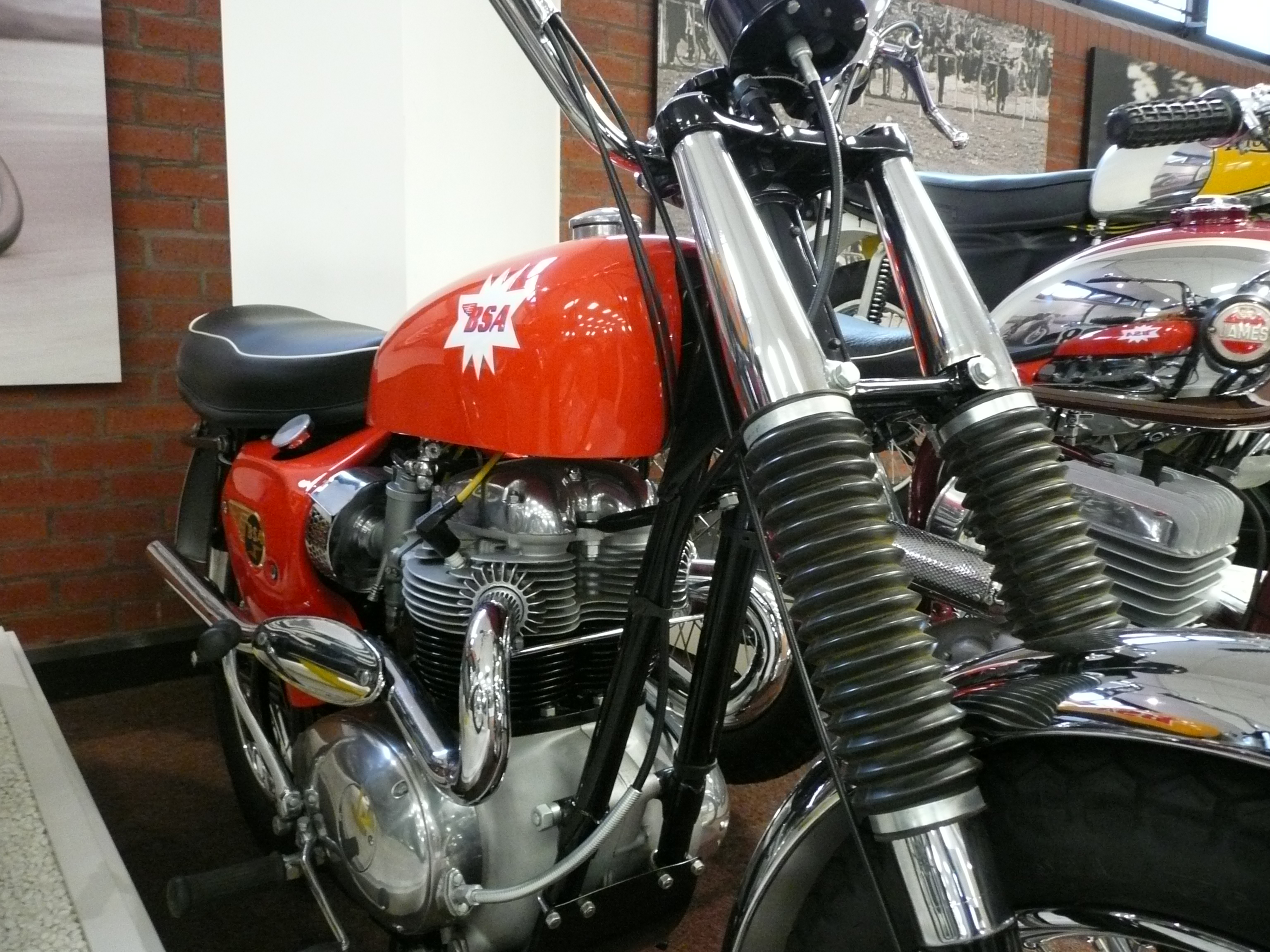
1966 File:BSA Hornet

1966 saw the rationalisation of the range and also the end to calling the same model different names in different countries:

- The 500cc Star (UK) and Royal Star (US) became the Royal Star in all areas, and was fitted with the 8" front brake of the rest of the range.
- The Cyclone models were renamed "Wasp"
- The 650 Star (UK) and Royal Star (US) models were discontinued
- The Rocket (UK) and Thunderbolt Rocket (US) became the Thunderbolt
- The Lightning (UK) and Lightning Rocket (US) became the Lightning
- The police models were discontinued although BSA continued to supply motorcycles to police forces but to that force's individual requirements.
- The US only Spitfire Hornet was renamed "Hornet" to avoid confusion with the newly introduced high performance "Spitfire" model.

The high performance Spitfire model, designated Mk II, featured 10.5:1 compression ratio, a pair of Amal 1-5/32” GP2 carbs on open bell-mouths and a close-ratio gearbox.

All models were upgraded to 12v electrics in this year.

=== 1967 ===
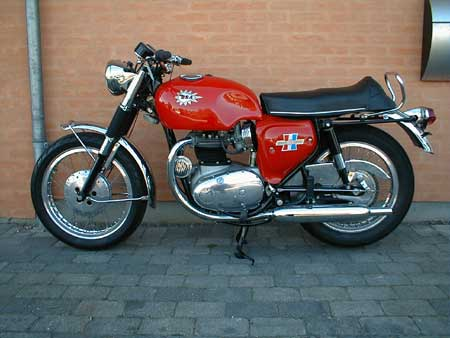
1967 BSA Spitfire Mk III

The Wasp models were discontinued, leaving the Royal Star as the only 500 model.

The Spitfire evolved into the MK III model with the compression ratio reduced to 9:1 and the carbs changed to the new Amal Concentrics. These changes gave improved starting and tractability at low speeds.

New forks with 2-way damping were introduced.

=== 1968 ===
The US only Hornet offroader was discontinued and a new model, the "Firebird Scrambler", was introduced in all sales areas.

All models were fitted with twin leading shoe front brakes and carburettors changed to Amal Concentrics. The Spitfire evolved into the Mk IV.

=== 1969 ===
With the introduction of the flagship Rocket 3 750cc triple, BSA decided that there was no longer a need for the top of the range 650 twin and the Spitfire was discontinued.

=== 1970 ===
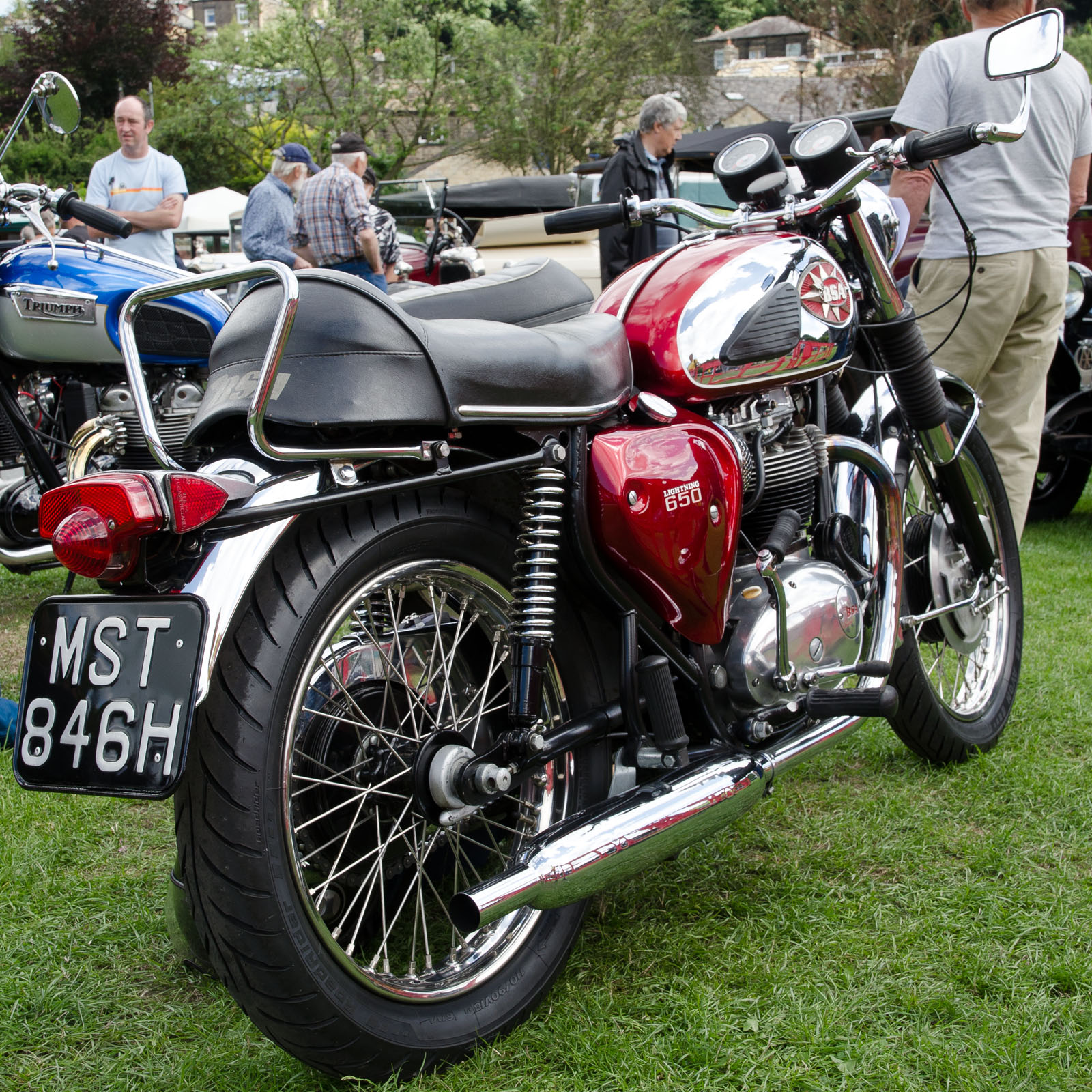
1970 BSA A65L Lightning

Apart from minor cosmetic changes, the range remained the same for 1970.

=== 1971 ===
With the introduction of the 500cc single cylinder B50 model, the Royal Star was discontinued.

The 650s were given new cycle parts, including the "oil-bearing frame". Apart from cosmetic items, the cycle parts were shared with the Triumph twins. (Triumph was a subsidiary of BSA).

To produce a 750cc machine for AMA Class C racing, BSA lengthened the stroke of Lightning's crankshaft by 11mm to give a displacement of 751cc. 202 A70 Lightning machines were produced to meet the minimum production requirements. All were exported to the US, most to the East Coast distributor in Baltimore.

=== 1972 ===
By 1972 BSA were in serious financial trouble and the Firebird Scrambler was discontinued in an attempt to reduce costs.

=== 1973 ===
With rival British motorcycle manufacturer, Norton-Villiers, also in financial trouble, the British government funded a rescue package that merged the two companies into a new company Norton Villiers Triumph (NVT). As part of the rationalisation of the products of the new company, NVT stopped production of BSA models.

== Other models ==
=== E35 Fury ===
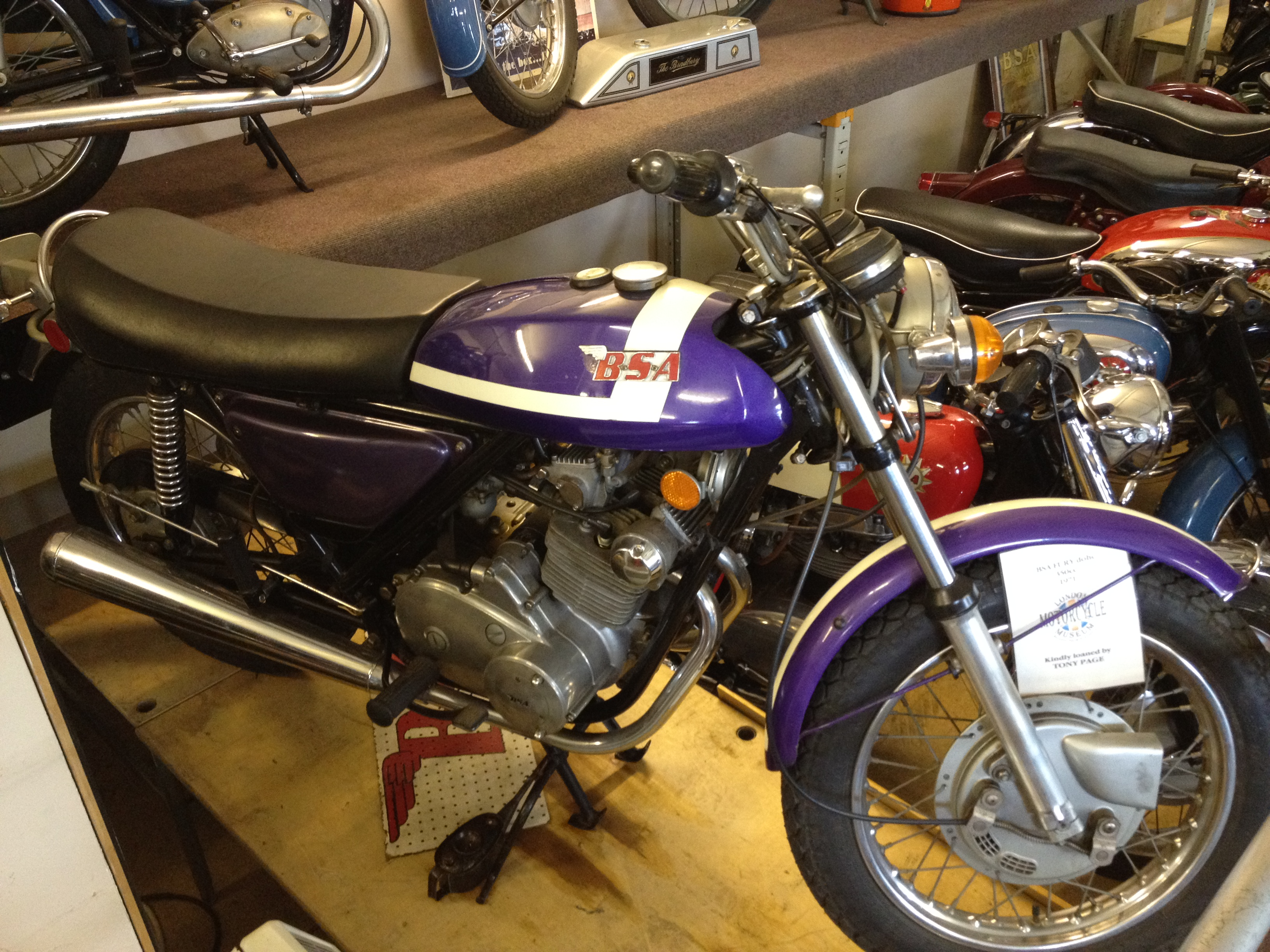
BSA Fury 350

The 'BSA Fury was a prototype motorcycle made in 1970. Designed by Edward Turner but substantially redesigned by Bert Hopwood and Doug Hele, the Fury never went into commercial production due to the collapse of the BSA Group.

Launched in 1971, the 349 cc (21.3 cu in) double overhead cam twin BSA E35 was branded the BSA Fury. It was essentially the same motorcycle as the Triumph Bandit and represented the BSA factory's last attempt to compete against Japanese imports. The frame used for the Fury was designed by Rob North, designer of the frames used on the racing BSA triples. A 'Street Scrambler' E35SS and road version the E35R were developed during 1971. Featuring upswept twin silencers, the SS had an optional electric starter and indicators and 26 mm Amal concentric carburettors. The Fury delivered 34 bhp (25 kW) and could reach 110 mph (180 km/h).

=== T65 Thunderbolt ===
In order to fulfil existing export orders after production of the BSA twins had stopped, between 200 and 300 Triumph TR6 Trophys were rebadged as BSA T65 Thunderbolt and exported to Spain and Australia.
