= BSA Golden Flash =

BSA A10 Golden Flash
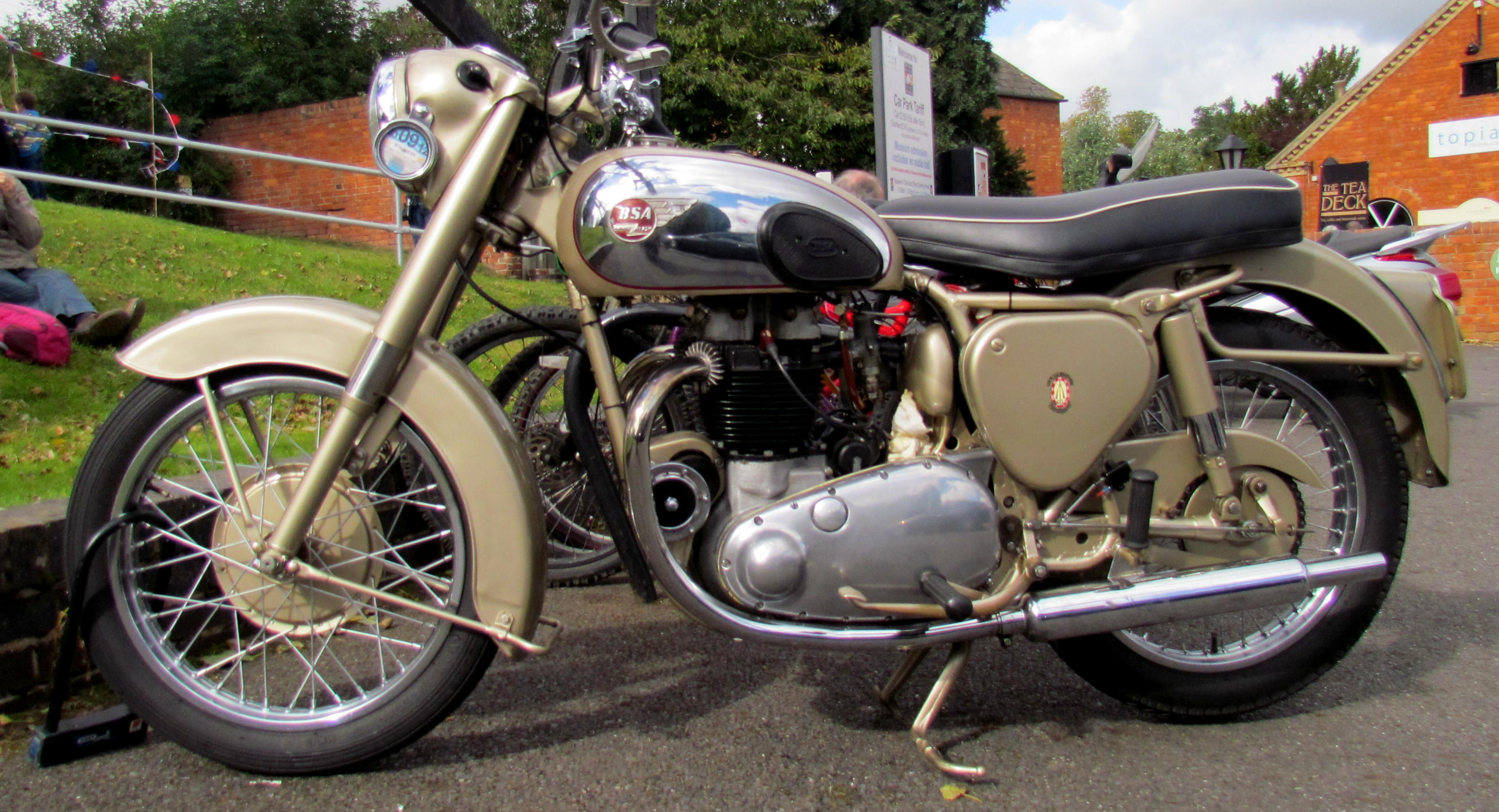
- 1950s Golden Flash with headlamp cowl and swinging arm rear suspension
- Manufacturer: Birmingham Small Arms Company (BSA)
- Also called: A10
- Production: 1950–63
- Assembly: Small Heath, Birmingham, UK
- Predecessor: none
- Successor: BSA A65 Star
- Engine: 646 cc (39.4 cu in) air cooled twin
- Bore / stroke: 70 mm × 84 mm (2.8 in × 3.3 in)
- Power: 35 bhp (26 kW) @ 4500 rpm
- Ignition type: Magneto
- Transmission: four-speed gearbox to chain drive
- Suspension: Telescopic fork (front), rigid plunger swinging arm (rear)
- Brakes: Drum
- Wheelbase: 1,391 mm (54.75 in)
- Dimensions: L: 2,100 mm (84 in)
- Weight: 179 kg (395 lb) (dry)
- Fuel capacity: 3.5 imp gal (16 L)

The BSA Golden Flash, commonly misnamed the Gold Flash, was a 646 cc (39.4 cu in) air-cooled parallel twin motorcycle designed by Bert Hopwood and produced by Birmingham Small Arms Company (BSA) at Small Heath, Birmingham. The Golden Flash was the first model in the BSA A10 series. It was available in black and chrome; but it was the distinctive golden paint scheme that gave The Golden Flash its name. Production continued until 1963, when it was superseded by the BSA A65 Star.

== Development ==
=== Background and development ===
Bert Hopwood served an apprenticeship under designer Val Page at Ariel. In 1936, Hopwood moved to Triumph, where he worked under Edward Turner to develop the 1937 Triumph Speed Twin. The innovative Speed Twin became the exemplar of the parallel twin engine layout for British motorcycles in the 1950s and 1960s. In April 1947 Hopwood joined Norton to design the Norton Dominator engine.

BSA, then the largest UK motorcycle manufacturer, was falling behind in the parallel-twin race. Although BSA had a parallel-twin, the BSA A7, they needed to develop the bike to remain competitive. In May 1948, the factory enticed Hopwood after only a year at Norton, and he was commissioned to create a competitive BSA parallel-twin. Launched in October 1949, Hopwood's A10 Golden Flash drew heavily from the A7 design by Page and Bert Perkins.

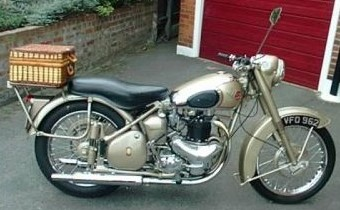
Early A10 Golden Flash with plunger rear suspension and semi-unit engine and gearbox. The gearbox is bolted to the rear of the engine. Rear suspension was originally optional.

The A10 was increased to 650 cc (40 cu in), with a revised alloy rocker box and cast-iron cylinder head, plus an integral manifold for the single Amal carburettor. A semi-unit gearbox meant the primary chain was adjustable via a slipper tensioner within the primary chain case. The frame was available in rear rigid format, but the more common option was plunger suspension, adopted for the export market. The A10 featured a hinged rear mudguard to ease rear wheel removal. The A10 was so closely based on the A7 that it used many of its well-proven components, and this large carry-over of parts from the A7 promised greater reliability, with minimal risk of new technical problems.

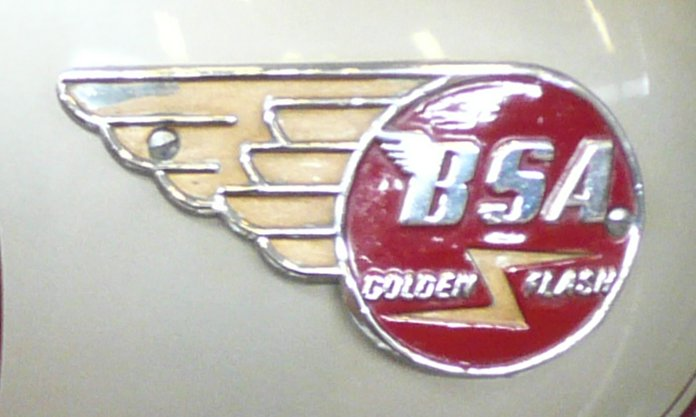
Early cast Golden Flash tank badge

=== Production ===
The BSA Golden Flash was launched in a new gold colour, and 80% of production was destined for the United States. This resulted in long delivery times for British customers, who were offered the model only in black.

Although never designed as a sport motorcycle, the Golden Flash was nonetheless fast for its time and competitive with the Triumph Tiger 100, achieving over 100 miles per hour (160 km/h) in tests in 1950, and covering a standing quarter mile (400 m) in under 16 seconds. Its gold colour proved a marketing success, outselling Triumph's Speed Twin and 6T Thunderbird.

BSA were concerned that wear in the plunger suspension was leading to uncertain handling. In 1954 the factory adopted a swinging arm, and the hinged mudguard was deleted. In a seemingly backwards step, the semi-unit gearbox was abandoned for a separate "pre-unit" item. The new design had a different primary chain adjustment, a modified clutch, and new gearbox internals.

A tuned version. the Super Flash was available in the US in 1963 - 1964. Following requests for a more powerful version from the US, the engine was turned with parts from the competition department. This was an interim measure whilst sports bike version of the A10, the Road Rocket was being developed.

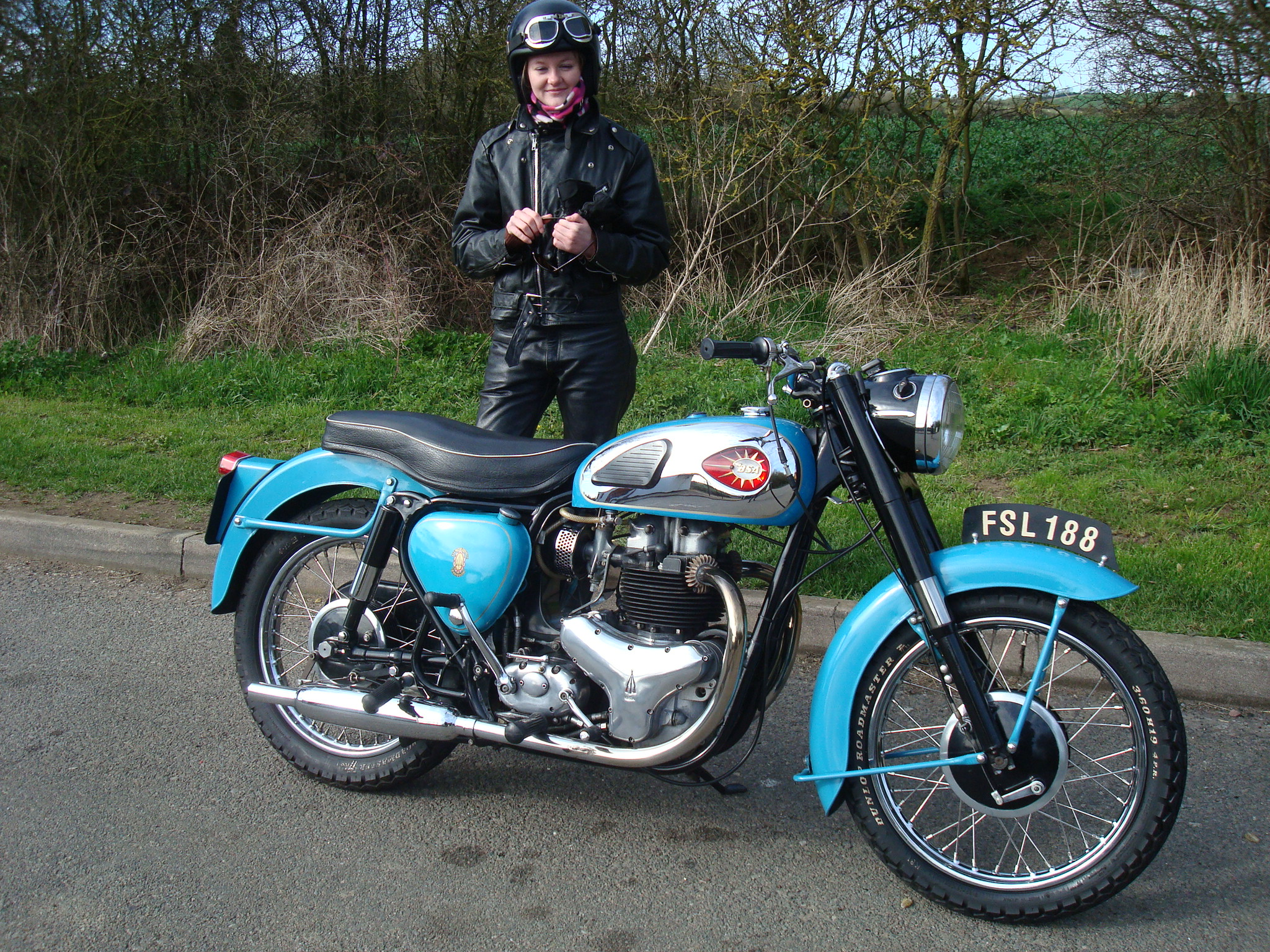
Later A10 Golden Flash, about 1961, with separate engine and gearbox; headlamp nacelle; swinging arm rear suspension; and "pear drop" BSA badges on either side of the fuel tank

In 1957 an improved clutch was introduced, using 4 springs instead of six and improved friction material.

For better reliability, the Golden Flash was upgraded in 1958 to the "thick flange" cylinders (base flange increased from 3/8" to 1/2") and larger big ends originally fitted to the Road Rocket.

For 1960 the model was fitted with the 356 sports camshaft and a larger (1 1/8" bore) 389 Monobloc carburettor. It was renamed the "Royal Tourist" in the US.

An alternator was offered as an alternative to the dynamo from 1961 to 1963, the last three years of production.

In the late 1950s, motorcycle electrical component manufacturer Lucas decided to switch production from magneto/dynamo systems to alternators/coil systems. This forced British motorcycle manufacturers to completely redesign their engines. With the launch of the new unit construction (combined engine/gearbox) BSA A50 and BSA A65, the A7 and A10 were discontinued in 1963.

- In the popular British television series Heartbeat a BSA Golden Flash is featured as the police motorcycle, having replaced a Francis Barnett Falcon F150.

== See also ==
- List of motorcycles of the 1950s
