= BSA Lightning Rocket =

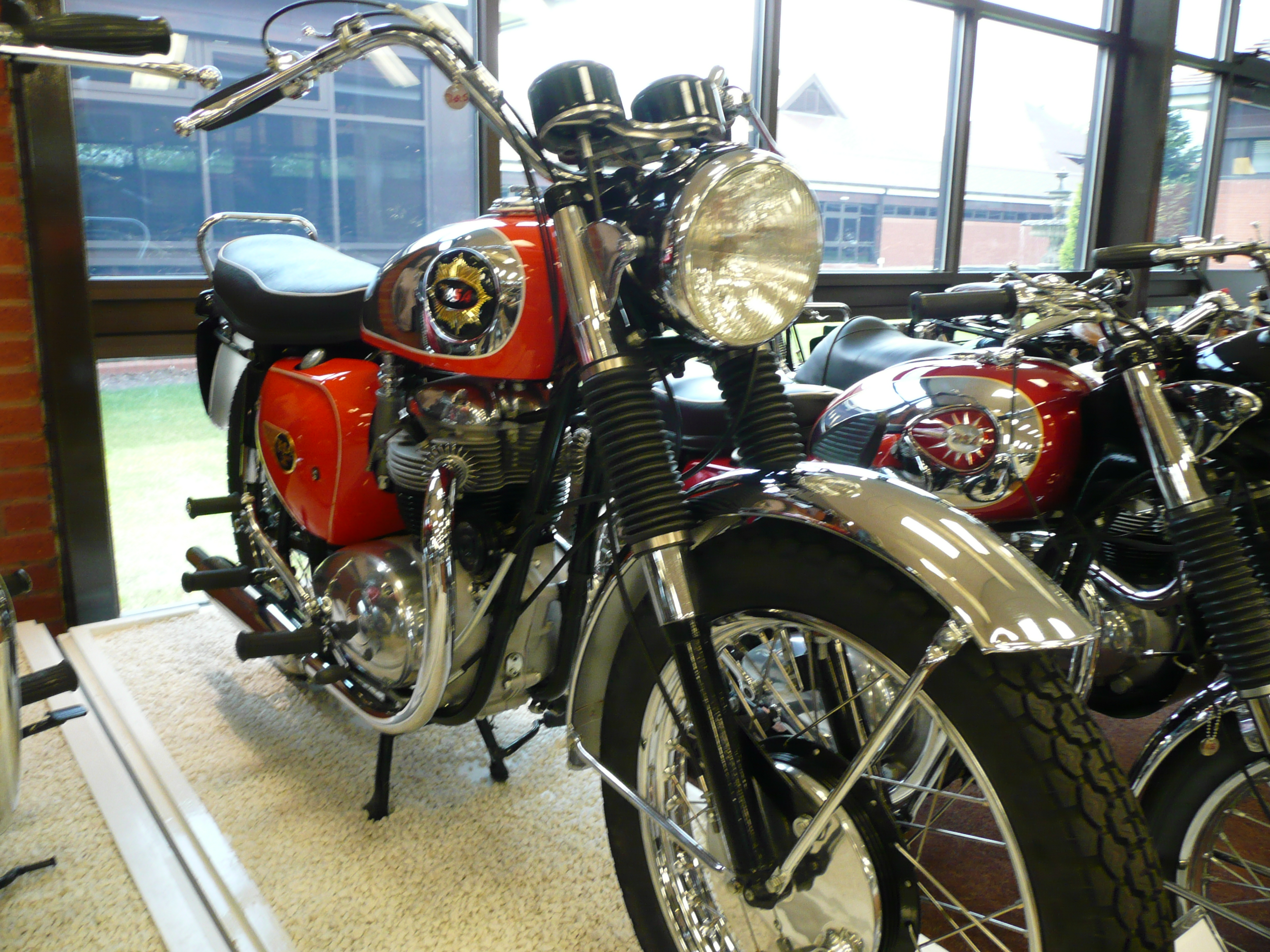
- Manufacturer: BSA, Birmingham
- Also called: BSA A65-2L
- Production: 1965
- Predecessor: BSA Royal Star
- Successor: BSA A65L
- Engine: 654cc, OHV parallel twin
- Top speed: 115mph
- Power: 48 bhp @ 6,250 rpm
- Transmission: Four speed gearbox to chain final drive
- Brakes: Drum brakes
- Wheelbase: 56 inches (140 cm)
- Seat height: 32.3 inches (82 cm)
- Weight: 395 lb (179 kg) (dry)

The BSA Lightning Rocket was a Birmingham Small Arms Company (BSA) motorcycle made in Birmingham. A highly tuned version of the BSA A65R Rocket, it was BSA's bid to capture the potentially lucrative USA export market in the mid-1960s. Twin Amal 389/206 carburetors and high-compression pistons, combined with an optional close-ratio gearbox, gave lively acceleration.

Sharing many A65 cycle parts, the Lightning Rocket had a slimmer fuel tank and mudguards, with additional chrome. From 1965, the A65 was discontinued in the UK and the BSA A65L Lightning became the main BSA production twin.

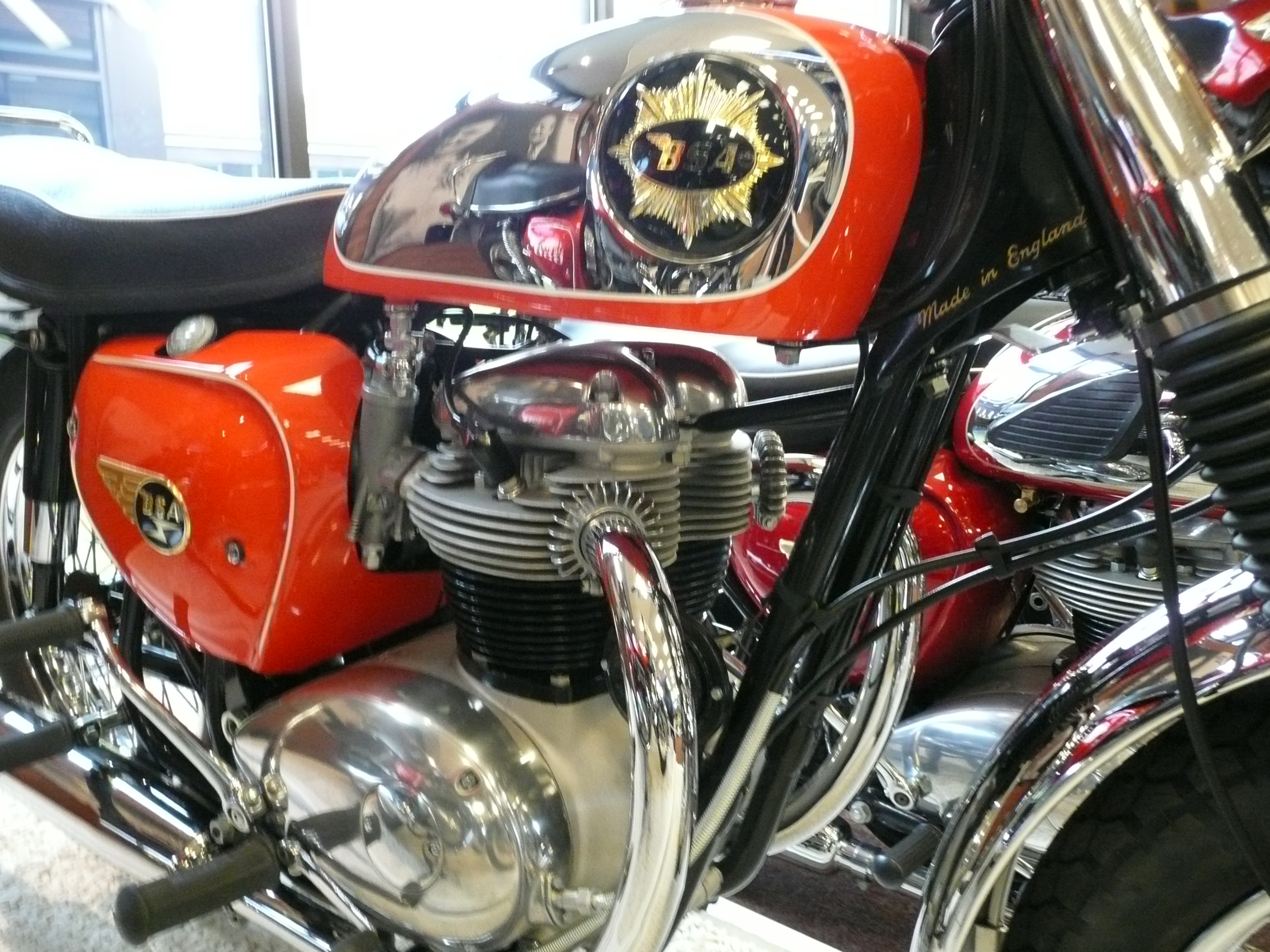
BSA Lightning Rocket at the National Motorcycle Museum (UK)

== See also ==
- BSA Royal Star
- BSA Spitfire
