= BSA Road Rocket =

BSA A10 Road Rocket
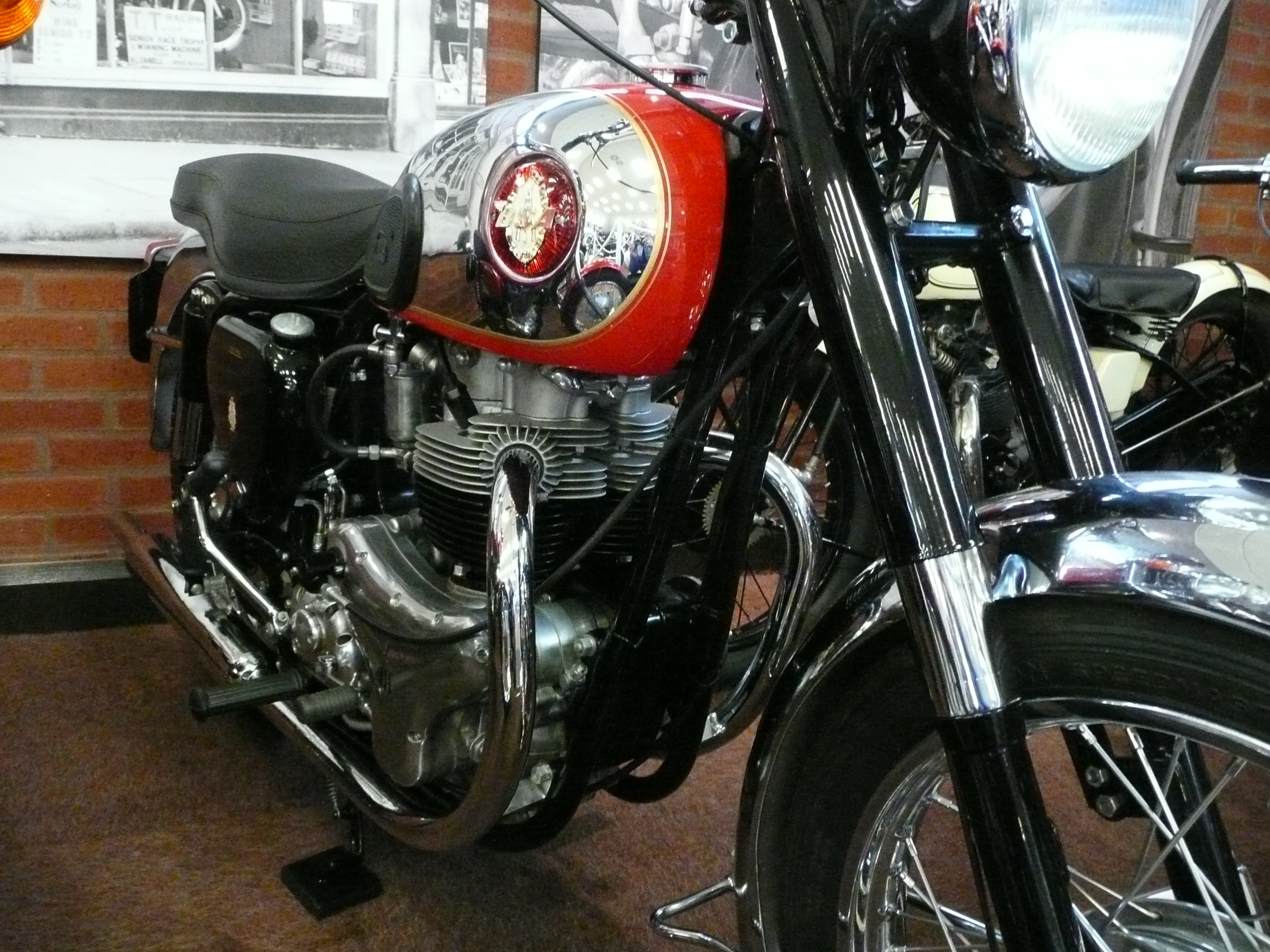
- Manufacturer: BSA
- Production: 1954-1958
- Assembly: Small Heath, Birmingham, UK
- Successor: BSA Super Rocket
- Engine: 646 cc air cooled twin
- Bore / stroke: 70 mm × 84 mm (2.8 in × 3.3 in)
- Power: 40 bhp (30 kW) @ 6,000rpm
- Ignition type: Magneto
- Transmission: Four speed, chain drive
- Suspension: Telescopic fork (front), swinging arm (rear)
- Brakes: Drum
- Wheelbase: 54.75 in (1,391 mm)
- Dimensions: L: 84 in (2,100 mm)
- Weight: 418 pounds (190 kg) (dry)
- Fuel capacity: 3.5 imp gal (16 L)
- Fuel consumption: 50 mpg_{‑imp} (5.6 L/100 km)

The BSA Road Rocket was a 1950s 646 cc (39.4 cu in) air-cooled parallel twin motorcycle designed by Bert Hopwood and produced by Birmingham Small Arms Company (BSA) at Small Heath, Birmingham. Developed from the A10 Golden Flash it was the first sports bike in the BSA A10 series. The A10 had a reputation for reliability but was struggling to compete against the Triumph engines and the Norton Featherbed frames. Advertised by BSA in 1956 as 'undoubtedly the world's greatest motor cycle' the Road Rocket was discontinued in 1958 when it was replaced by the BSA Super Rocket.

== Development ==
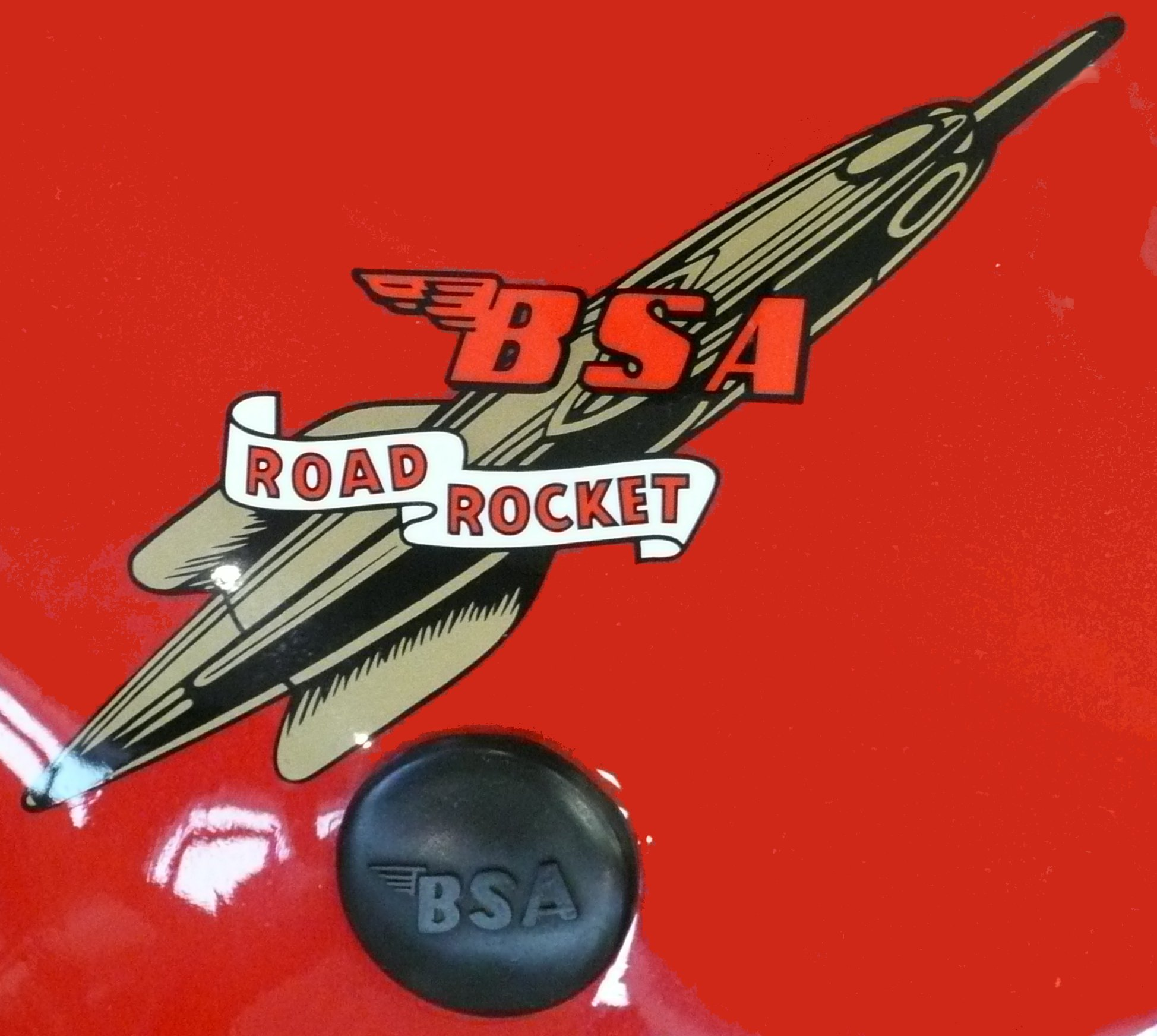
Road Rocket badge on top of fuel tank

Launched as the top of BSA's range in 1954 the BSA Road Rocket was the first A10 engine with an alloy cylinder head. Unlike the Golden Flash, the inlet manifold was separate from the cylinder head enabling twin carburettors to be fitted if required. It had a single Amal TT carburettor as standard.

New "thick flange" cylinders were introduced: the bottom flange was increased from 3/8 to 1/2 in (9.5 to 12.7 mm) for improved rigidity and reliability. The big-end size was increased from 1.48" to 1.68". It had high compression pistons and a higher lift camshaft with the 356 "sports" profile. These engine modifications raised the power output to 40 bhp (30 kW) and a top speed of 109 mph (175 km/h).

The model was launched with chrome mudguards and stays and a half-chrome petrol tank. A tachometer was an optional extra.

In 1957 an improved clutch was introduced, using 4 springs instead of six and improved friction material.

== See also ==
- List of motorcycles of the 1950s
