= BSA Super Rocket =

BSA A10 Super Rocket
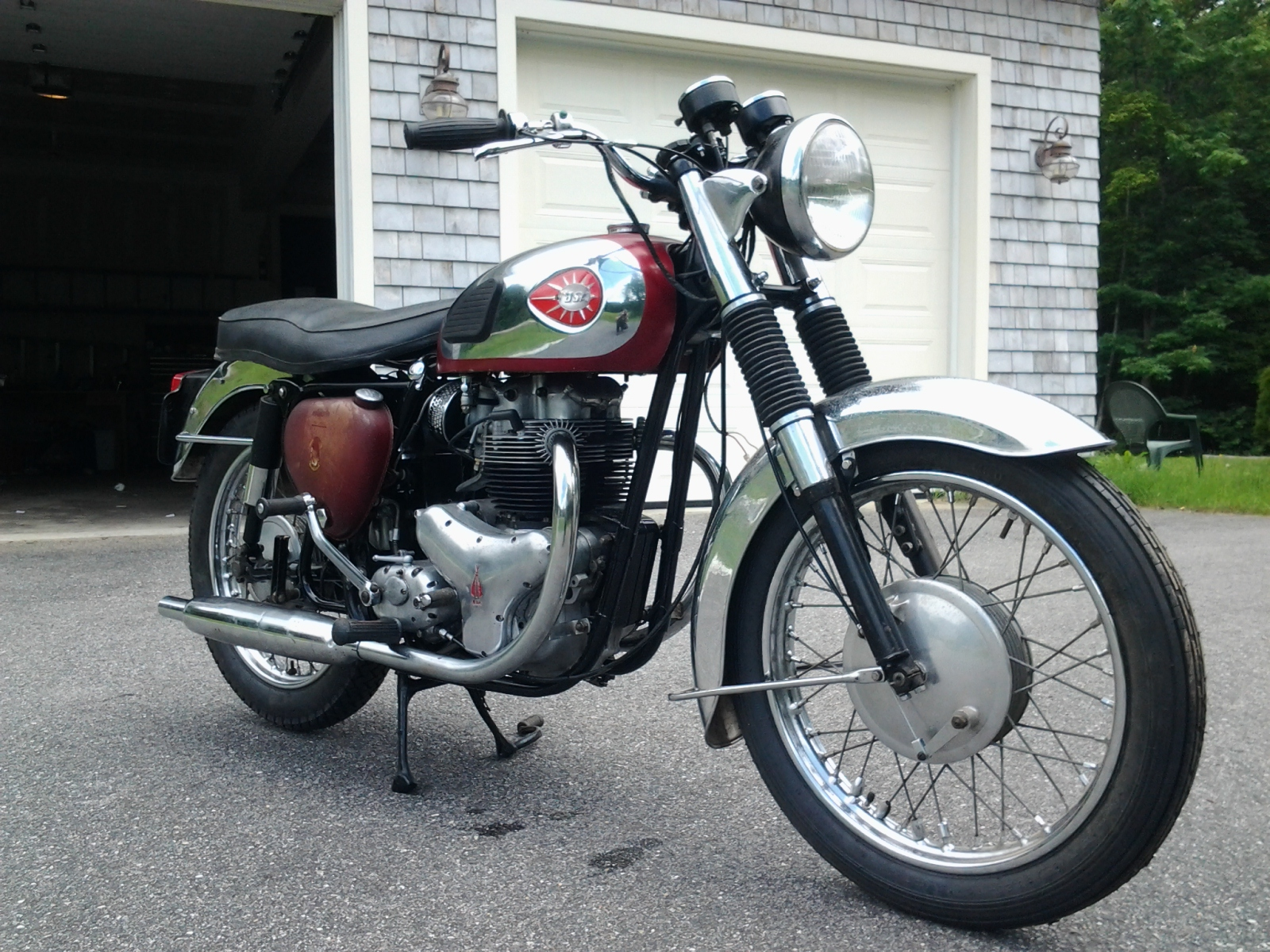
- 1963 BSA A10 Super Rocket.
- Manufacturer: Birmingham Small Arms Company (BSA)
- Production: 1957–1963
- Predecessor: BSA Road Rocket
- Engine: 646 cc (39.4 cu in) air cooled twin
- Bore / stroke: 70 mm × 84 mm (2.8 in × 3.3 in)
- Transmission: Four speed, chain drive
- Wheelbase: 1,391 mm (54.75 in)
- Dimensions: L: 2,100 mm (84 in)

The BSA Super Rocket was a 646 cc (39.4 cu in) air-cooled parallel twin motorcycle produced by Birmingham Small Arms Company (BSA) at Small Heath, Birmingham introduced in 1957. It was an improved sports bike member of the BSA A10 series of motorcycles which was developed from the BSA Road Rocket. The A10 had a reputation for reliability but was struggling to compete against the Triumph engines and the Norton Featherbed frames. The model was discontinued in 1963 when the unit-construction A65 was introduced.

== Development ==
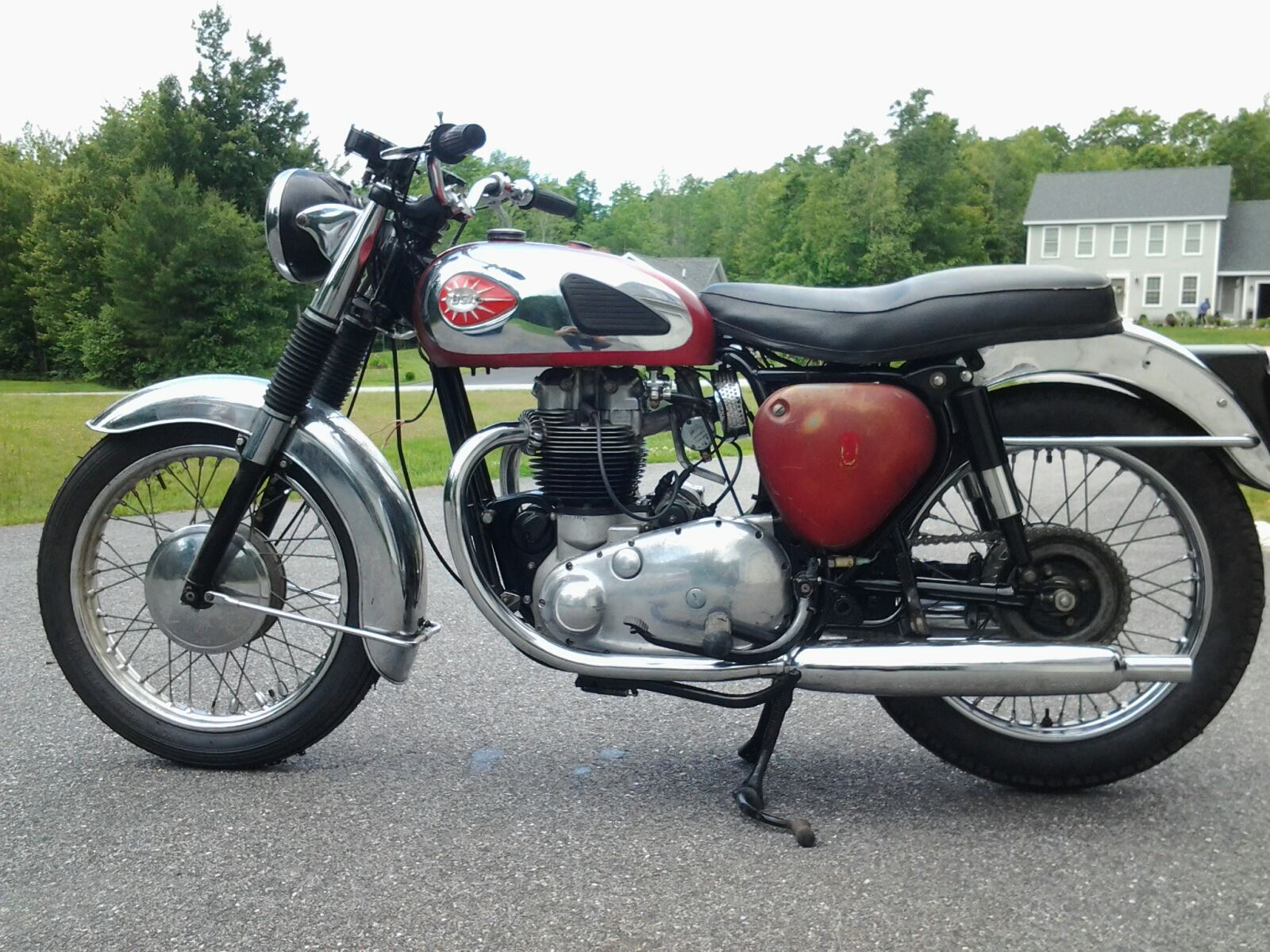
1963 BSA A10 Super Rocket

Launched in 1957 the BSA Super Rocket retained the Amal TT carburettor and 356 sports cam of the Road Rocket. Compression ratio was raised to 8.5:1 and a new alloy cylinder head fitted. The cylinder head had a cast in inlet manifold and larger ports and valves. The inlet valves were increased from 1.455" to 1.5". The crankshaft was stiffened compared to the previous models. These modifications increased power output to 43 bhp. A lower 1st gear ratio gave increased acceleration off the line. Cycle World, the American motorcycle magazine, tested the Super Rocket at 116 mph.

New brakes were fitted to the model, full width hubs instead of the previous half width items. The front brake was 8" and the rear 7". Both were operated by cables.

American models had a chrome rocket ornament on the front mudguard. It used the mounting holes that other markets used for the front number plate. East Coast models had a 4 US gallon (3.3 imperial gallon) petrol tanks, wider "Twin-Solo" seat and "Laconia Bend" handlebars. West Coast models had a 2 US gallon (1.7 imp) tank for 1958/9 and 3 US gallon (2.5 imp) from 1960 on. The West Coast models also had a narrower "cushionaire" seat and "Gunter Bend" handlebars. A tachometer was standard on US models.

UK models had a headlamp cowl (nacelle), deeper valenced mudguards and a tachometer was an optional extra.

The 357 race camshaft was fitted in 1960 and the clutch was improved. A larger 1 5/32" bore Monobloc carburettor was fitted in 1962. These raised the power output to 46 bhp (34 kW).

== See also ==
- List of motorcycles of the 1950s
