= BSA A65 Rocket =

BSA A65R Rocket
- Manufacturer: BSA
- Also called: A65B and A65C (with rev counter)
- Production: 1964-1965
- Predecessor: BSA A65 Star
- Engine: 654cc air cooled OHV twin
- Transmission: four speed gearbox to chain drive
- Wheelbase: 54 inches (140 cm)
- Weight: 396 pounds (180 kg) (dry)
- Fuel capacity: 4 gallons

The BSA A65R Rocket was one of a series of unit construction twin cylinder Birmingham Small Arms Company (BSA) motorcycles made in the 1960s. A version branded as the A65 'Thunderbolt Rocket' was aimed at the US market. The A65R Rocket was produced from 1964 but was stopped in 1965 when all development at BSA was halted by financial difficulties.

== Development ==
The A65R was a development of the old model range led by Bob Fearon, managing director and General Manager of BSA and Chief Development Engineer Bert Perrigo they developed the unit construction Star twins. To make the A65R more of a 'sports version' of the original BSA A65 Star (and in anticipation of more stringent noise control legislation) it was given 'siamesed' two-into-one exhaust pipes with a special baffle, as well as chrome plated mudguards and headlight brackets. Able to cruise at 85 mph (137 km/h) and with a top speed of 108 mph (174 km/h) it was sold as the fastest BSA in production.

For the 1964 Isle of Man TT races, the BSA factory supplied the travelling Marshals with A65Rs, specially modified to be more 'racing-style' with lower handlebars, rear-set foot controls and a seat having a rear hump. A special version of the A65 branded as the A65T/R 'Thunderbolt Rocket' was aimed at the US market and featured high rise handlebars and a smaller fuel tank.

By 1965 competition from motorcycle producers such as Honda were eroding BSA's previously rising sales figures. BSA's marketing team was slow to respond and new motorcycle development contributed to substantial losses, so by 1972 the company was absorbed into Manganese Bronze Holdings in a rescue plan initiated by the Department of Industry. A plan to combine Norton, BSA and Triumph failed through poor industrial relations and the BSA factories closed.

== BSA Lightning Rocket ==
The BSA Lightning Rocket was a highly tuned version of the BSA A65R Rocket and featured twin Amal 389/206 carburettors and high compression pistons combined with an optional close ratio gear box to give lively acceleration. The Lightning Rocket had a slimmer fuel tank and mudguards - with extra chrome. From 1965 the Lightning Rocket was discontinued in the UK.
