= BSA A50 Royal Star =

BSA Royal Star
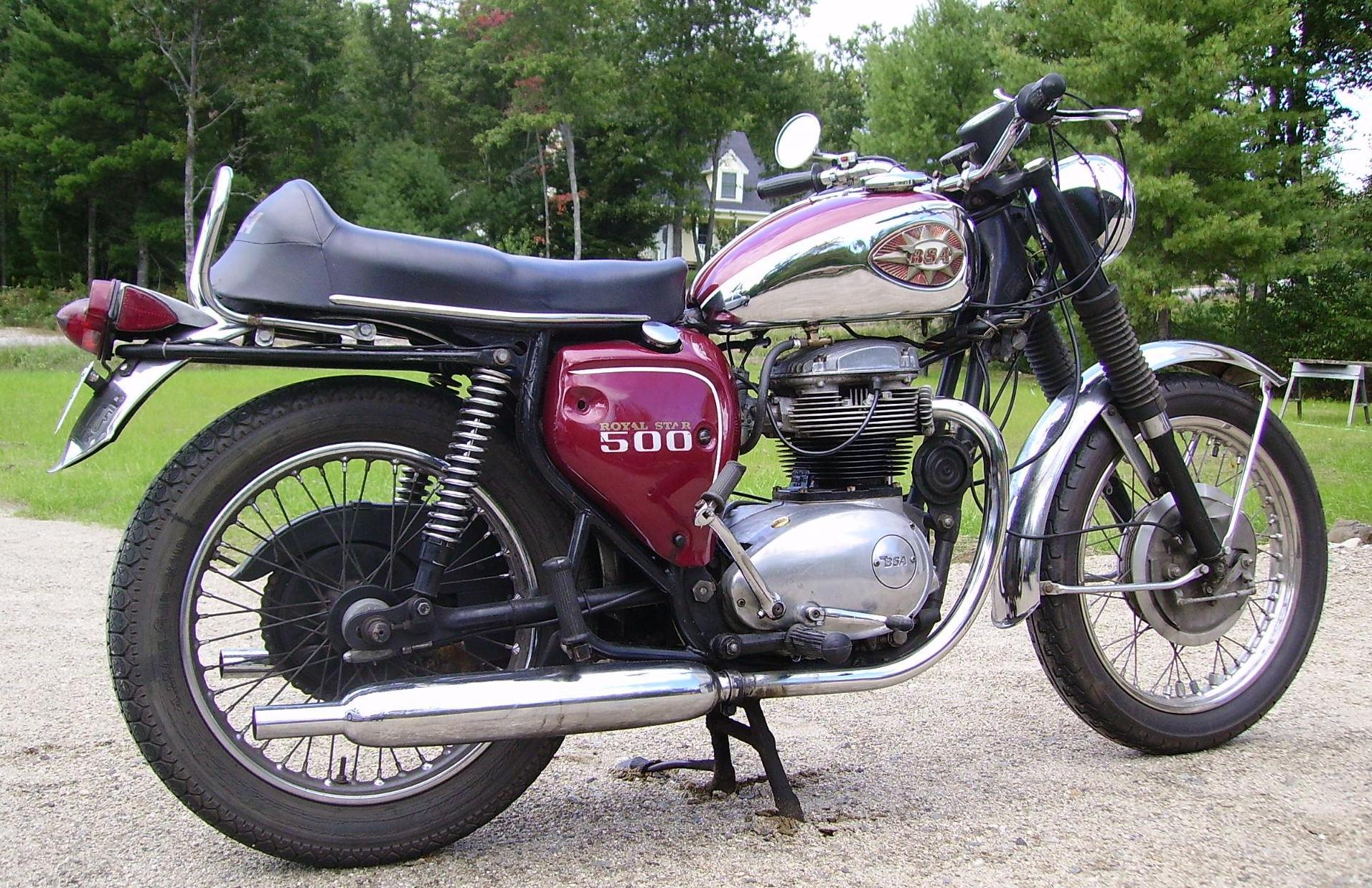
- Manufacturer: BSA
- Also called: A50, Star, Star Twin
- Production: 1962-1970
- Predecessor: BSA A7
- Successor: BSA B50
- Engine: 498cc air cooled twin
- Power: 33bhp @ 5800 RPM
- Transmission: four speed gearbox to chain drive
- Wheelbase: 54.75 inches (139.1 cm)
- Dimensions: L: 81 inches (210 cm); W: 11.7 inches (30 cm)
- Seat height: 32 inches (81 cm)
- Weight: 392.4 pounds (178.0 kg) (dry)
- Fuel capacity: 4 gallons

The BSA Royal Star was a Birmingham Small Arms Company (BSA) motorcycle whose new engine design paved the way for a range of successful unit construction twins. As well as giving a clean look to the engine, with the pushrod passages part of the cylinder block casting, unit construction reduced the number of places oil could leak from.

== Development ==
The decision by Lucas in the late 1950s to switch production of motorcycle electrical components (from magneto/dynamo systems to alternator/coil systems) forced British motorcycle manufacturers to completely redesign their engines. Triumph and BSA took the opportunity to move from pre-unit and semi-unit construction to full unit construction, that is, with the engine and gearbox together in an integrated casting. At the same time, Bob Fearon, managing director and General Manager of BSA recognised the need for an updated look that built on the best features of the A10 but which would succeed in the potentially lucrative but competitive United States market. Working with Chief Development Engineer Bert Perrigo they developed the unit construction Star twins. Launched in 1962 as the 500 cc BSA A50 Star, the model was widely exported to the US and Australia as well as becoming a top seller in the UK in the early 1960s. The model was known as the Royal Star in export markets and Star or Star Twin in the UK. From 1966 it was known as the Royal Star in all markets.

The Royal Star had a relatively small 1" single Amal Monobloc carburettor, and later Concentric carburettor, but in 1964 new 8.5:1 pistons and a new gearbox improved performance. The machine had a top speed of about 90 mph and was relatively free of vibration. Sharing common engine and cycle parts with the larger BSA A65 Star 650 twin, it was an over-engineered machine and proved very robust. The only major fault with the engine design was a plain crankshaft bearing on the timing side which, when worn, would cause a drop in oil pressure. In 1965, BSA addressed the bearing issues with a roller bearing on the drive side, as it had been on the pre-unit engines, with an improved bronze bushing on the timing side.

== A50 Cyclone ==
The Cyclone was the same basic machine as the Royal Star except fitted for high performance. The A50CC Cyclone Competition built for the US market model year 1964 had dual 1 1/16" carburettors, higher 10.5:1 engine compression, magneto ignition, larger front brake, 2 gallon fuel tank and upswept open exhaust. Built for scrambles, this model had no road lights. The A50C Cyclone Road built for the US market model years 1964 and 1965 had 1 1/16" dual carburettors, higher 9:1 compression engine and larger front brake. This model had battery ignition, full road lighting and the same 2 gallon fuel tank. Both models were available for the UK market with 9:1 engine compression, battery ignition and 4 gallon fuel tanks.[1]
