= BSA A65 Star =

Motorcycle

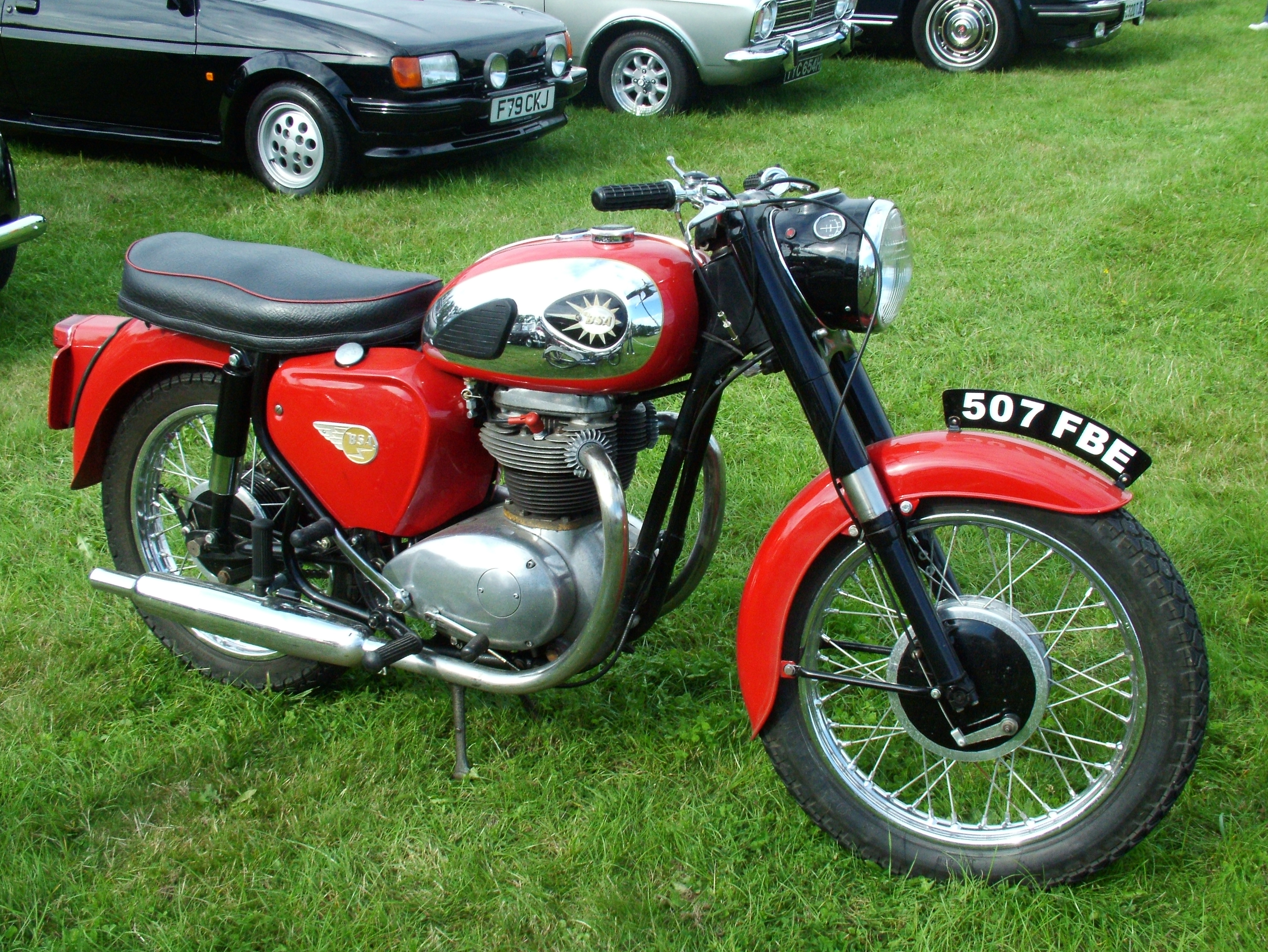
- Manufacturer: Birmingham Small Arms Company (BSA)
- Production: 1962–1972
- Predecessor: BSA A10
- Engine: 654 cc (39.9 cu in) air-cooled OHV twin
- Bore / stroke: 75 mm × 74 mm (3.0 in × 2.9 in)
- Power: 38 bhp (28 kW) @ 5,000 rpm
- Transmission: four speed gearbox to chain drive
- Wheelbase: 54 in (1,400 mm)
- Weight: 406 lb (184 kg) (wet)
- Fuel capacity: 4 gallons
- Fuel consumption: 50mpg

The BSA A65 Star was a Birmingham Small Arms Company (BSA) motorcycle aimed at the US market for unit construction twins. As well as giving a clean look to the engine, with the pushrod passages part of the cylinder block casting, unit construction reduced the number of places oil could leak from. A range of A65 Star twins was produced between 1962 and 1972.

== Development ==
The decision by Lucas in the late 1950s to switch production of motorcycle electrical components (from magneto/dynamo systems to alternators/coil systems) forced British motorcycle manufacturers to completely redesign their engines. Triumph and BSA took the opportunity to move from pre-unit and semi-unit construction to full unit construction, that is, with the engine and gearbox together in an integrated casting. At the same time, Bob Fearon, managing director and general manager of BSA, recognised the need for a new look that built on the best features of the A10s but would succeed in the potentially lucrative, but competitive, US market. Working with chief development engineer Bert Perrigo, he developed the unit construction Star twins.

A range of these 650 cc (40 cu in) Star twins were produced between 1962 and 1972, and improved on the old pre-unit A7 and A10 series, being lighter and easier to manufacture, with more up to date styling. Not enough time was spent on testing and development as BSA were struggling to remain competitive with Triumph models and the emerging Japanese motorcycles. Large side panels were fitted to cover the space behind the engine but they contributed to a dated look. This was reinforced by engine vibration, but acceleration was good to a top speed of 100 miles per hour (160 km/h).

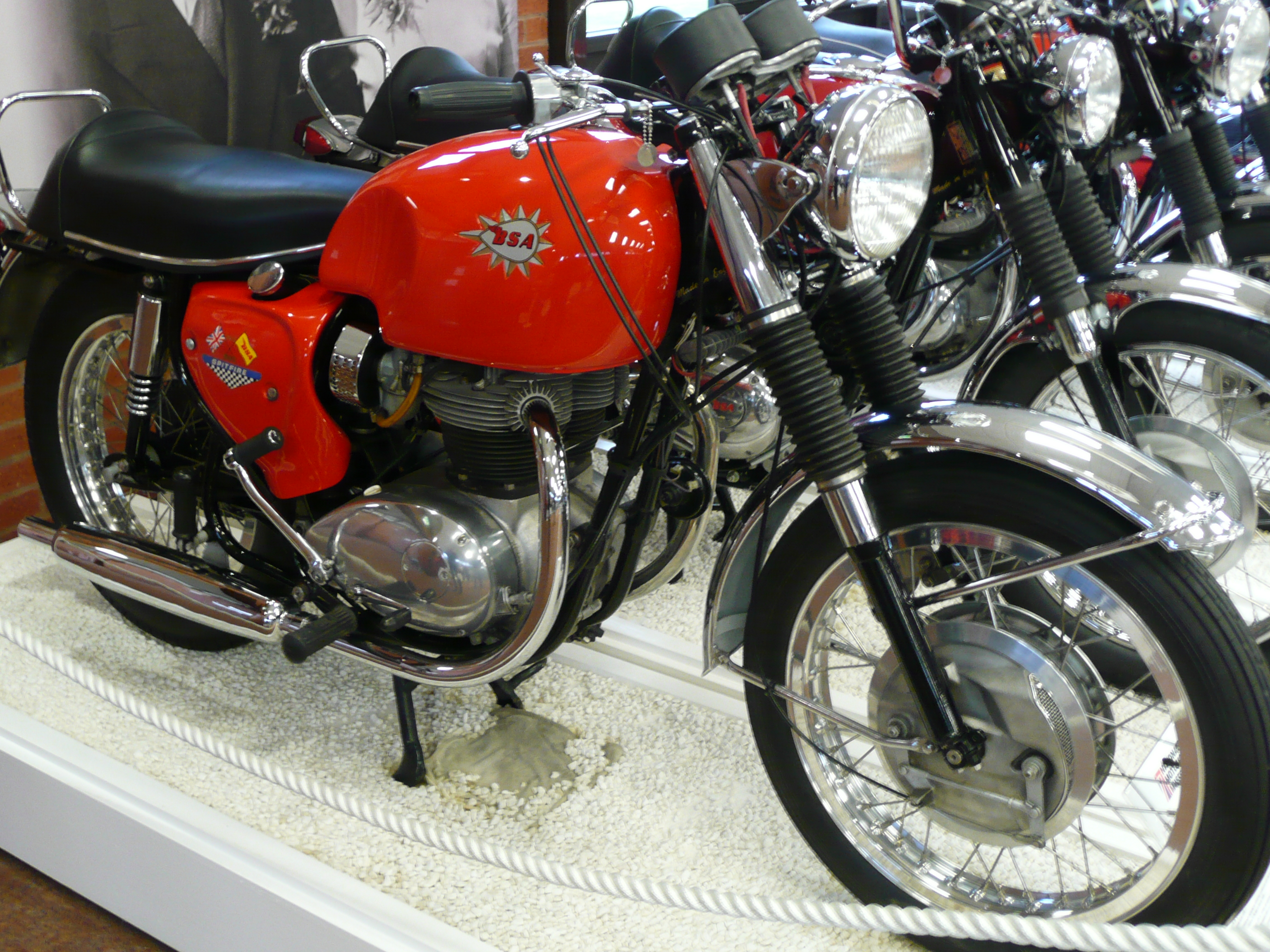
BSA Spitfire

Twelve volt electrics were introduced in 1966 and the top of the range BSA Spitfire with a claimed top speed of 120 mph (190 km/h). In 1967 BSA won a special Queens Award to Industry and by 1969 80% of the BSA factory production was going to America. In the US the 650 Star twins were selling well with styling changes including high rise handlebars and more streamlined fuel tanks. In 1970 a new 'oil in frame' design was adopted but this proved unpopular with shorter riders, as it increased the seat height. This was sorted out by 1972 but by then BSA were facing serious financial problems and stopped production of the outdated 650 Star twin.

== See also ==
- BSA A65 Rocket
