= BSA A10 series =

Motorcycle

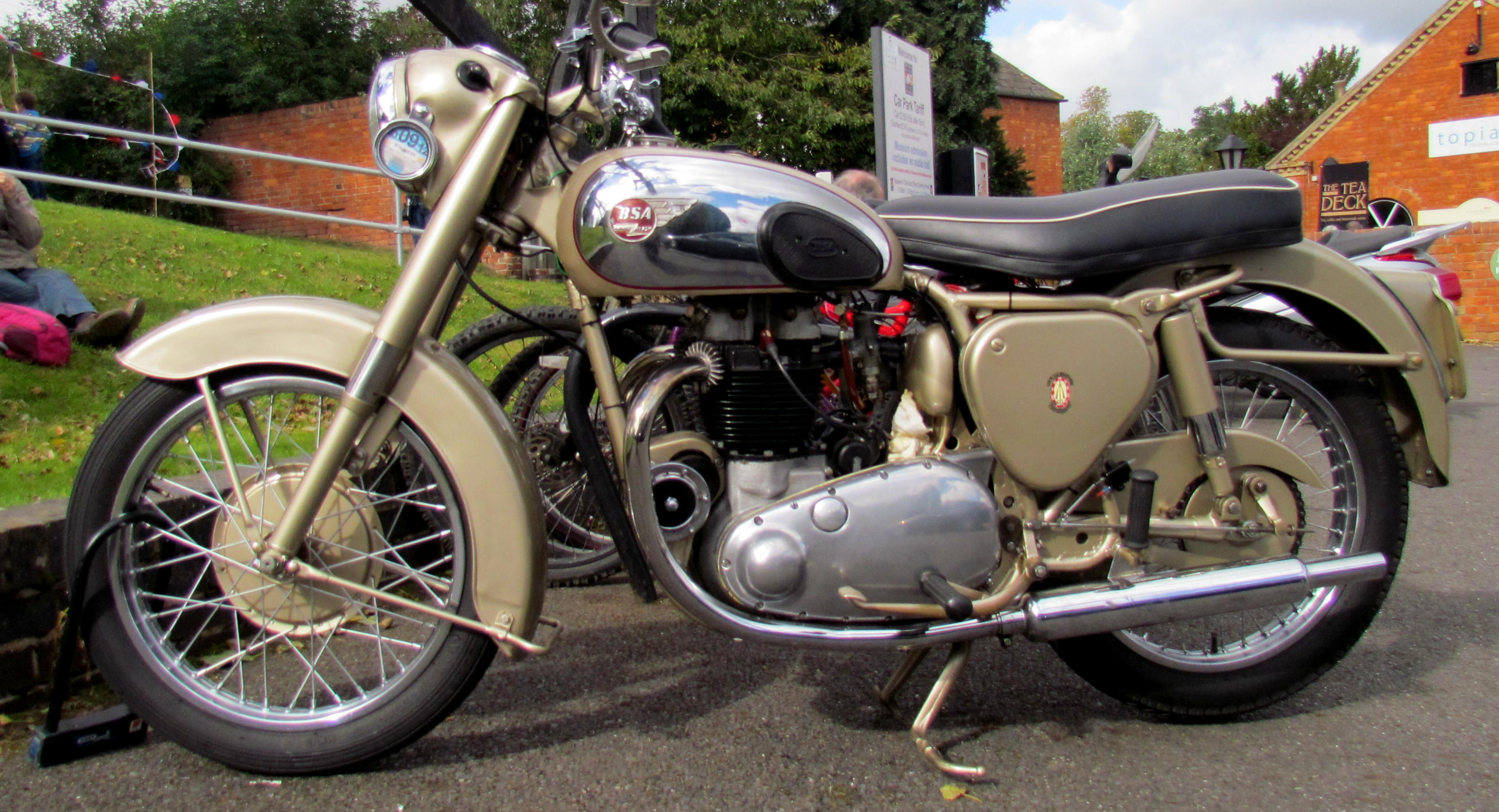
- Swinging arm BSA Golden Flash
- Manufacturer: BSA
- Production: 1950 - 1963
- Assembly: Small Heath, Birmingham, UK
- Predecessor: None
- Successor: BSA A65
- Engine: 646 cc (39.4 cu in) air cooled twin
- Bore / stroke: 70 mm × 84 mm (2.8 in × 3.3 in)
- Ignition type: Magneto
- Transmission: 4 speed chain drive
- Frame type: Rigid; Plunger; Swinging Arm
- Suspension: Telescopic fork (front)
- Brakes: Drum brakes

The BSA A10 series was a range of 646 cc (39.4 cu in) air-cooled parallel twin motorcycles designed by Bert Hopwood and produced by Birmingham Small Arms Company at Small Heath, Birmingham from 1950 to 1963. The series was succeeded by the A65 unit construction models.

== Background ==
BSA, then the largest UK motorcycle manufacturer, was falling behind in the parallel-twin race after the introduction of the 650cc Triumph Thunderbird. Although BSA had a 500cc parallel-twin, the BSA A7, they needed to develop a 650 to remain competitive.

Bert Hopwood served an apprenticeship under designer Val Page at Ariel. In 1936, Hopwood moved to Triumph, where he worked under Edward Turner to develop the 1937 Triumph Speed Twin. The innovative Speed Twin became the exemplar of the parallel twin engine layout for British motorcycles in the 1950s and 1960s. In April 1947 Hopwood joined Norton to design the Norton Dominator engine.

In May 1948, the factory enticed Hopwood after only a year at Norton, and he was commissioned to create a competitive BSA 650cc parallel-twin.

== Development ==
=== Engine ===
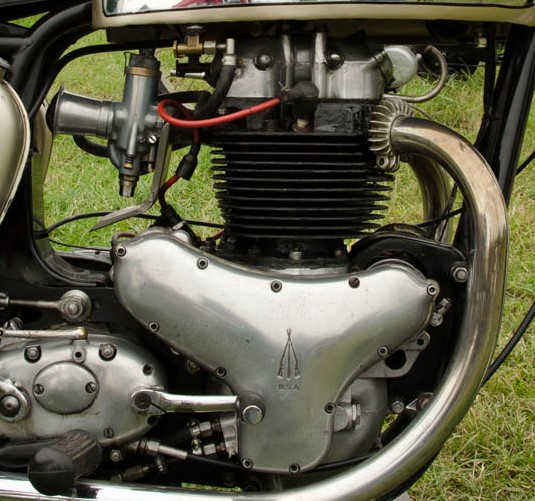
A10 engine (1958 Golden Flash)

Launched in October 1949, Hopwood's A10 Golden Flash drew heavily from the A7 design by Page and Bert Perkins. The A10 was increased to 650 cc (40 cu in) by using a 70mm bore and 84mm stroke. It had a revised alloy rocker box and cast-iron cylinder head, plus an integral manifold for the single Amal carburettor. A single camshaft behind the cylinders operated the valves via pushrods passing through a tunnel in the cast iron block. A magneto was located behind the cylinders, driven by a train of gears, to provide ignition. A dynamo was positioned in front of the cylinders, driven by a chain. Lubrication was dry sump with oil being distributed by a mechanical pump located inside the timing cover.

The crankshaft was a bolt-up 360-degree item (both pistons went up and down at the same time). Main bearings were roller drive-side and a white metal plain bush on the timing side. The conrods were of the split type with shell type big ends. The crank-cases were vertically split.

A semi-unit gearbox meant the duplex primary chain was adjustable via a slipper tensioner within the primary chain case. The A10 was so closely based on the A7 that it used many of its well-proven components, and this large carry-over of parts from the A7 promised greater reliability, with minimal risk of new technical problems.

With the introduction of a swinging arm frame in 1954, the semi-unit gearbox was abandoned for a separate "pre-unit" item. The new design had a modified clutch, new gearbox internals and a single row primary chain. The primary chain was adjusted by moving the gearbox, which caused the rear chain to require re-tensioning.

An alloy head was introduced with the Road Rocket in 1955. The RR also featured a thicker cylinder base flange (1/2" instead of 3/8") and these cylinders became known as "thick flange". The big end was increased in diameter from 1.46" to 1.68". Crankshafts and conrods with the bigger big ends became known as "big journal". These changes continued on subsequent sports models. "Thick flange" cylinders and "big journal" big ends were fitted to the Gold Flash in 1958.

In 1957 an improved clutch was introduced on all models, using 4 springs instead of six and improved friction material.

==== Camshafts ====
Three different camshafts were used on the production models, with another available as an accessory for racing only.

- 334 "standard" - fitted to the Golden Flash from 1950 - 1959.
- 356 "sports" - Fitted to the Road Rocket, to the Super Rocket until 1959 and The Golden Flash from 1960. Originally fitted to the A7 Star Twin.
- 357 "race" - Fitted to the Super Flash, Spitfire Scrambler and Rocket Gold Star. Also fitted to the Super Rocket from 1960. Also known as Spitfire cam.
- 358 "acceleration" - "Gives maximum 'dig-out' power. For racing use - not recommended for road use."

==== Carburettors ====
Five different Amal carburettors were fitted to the range.

- 76/276 (1 1/16" bore) - Rigid and plunger framed Golden Flash, also swinging arm Golden Flash in 1954.
- 10TT9 (1 1/16" bore) - Super Flash and Road Rocket, also Super Road until 1961.
- 376 Monobloc (1 1/16" bore) - Golden flash swinging arm frame 1955 to 1959 and Spitfire Scrambler (1956 - 1959).
- 389 Monobloc (1 1/8" bore) - Golden flash 1960 on.
- 389 Monobloc (1 5/32" bore) - Spitfire Scrambler (1960 on), Super Rocket (1962 on) and Rocket Gold Star.

=== Cycle Parts ===
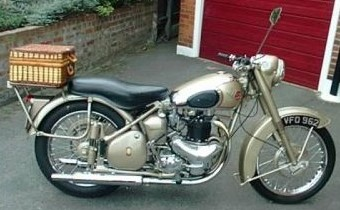
Early Golden Flash A10s had frames with either no rear suspension, or plungers, and had a semi-unit engine and gearbox, with the gearbox bolted to the rear of the engine

The frame was available in rear rigid format, but the more common option was plunger suspension, adopted for the export market. The A10 featured a hinged rear mudguard to ease rear wheel removal.

BSA were concerned that wear in the plunger suspension was leading to uncertain handling. In 1954 the factory adopted a swinging arm, and the hinged mudguard was deleted. Plunger frames remained an option on the Gold Flash until 1957.

Brakes were initially an 8" single side front brake and a 7" rear. Full width brake of the same size were fitted to the higher performance models from 1958. Some of the Spitfire Scramblers and the Rocket Gold Star used a Gold Star 190mm front brake.

The Rocket Gold Star used Gold Star cycle parts (Frame numbers beginning with A10, all other A10 models had frames starting with A7) Spitfire Scramblers also used Gold Star Catalina cycle parts in 1957 and 1963.

== Models ==
=== Overview of models ===
All models are swinging arm frame unless otherwise indicated.

1950	1951	1952	1953	1954	1955	1956	1957	1958	1959	1960	1961	1962	1963
A10 Golden Flash (Rigid)													
A10 Golden Flash (Plunger)													
				A10 Golden Flash (Note: Also known as "Royal Tourist" in the US from 1960.)									
											A10 Golden Flash (Alternator)		
			A10SF Super Flash (Plunger)										
				A10SF Super Flash									
					A10R Road Rocket								
							A10S Spitfire Scrambler (Note: Also known as "Gold Star Spitfire Scrambler" and "Rocket Gold Star Scrambler")						
								A10R Super Rocket					
												A10RGS Rocket Gold Star (Note: Also known as "Gold Star Twin")	

=== Golden Flash ===
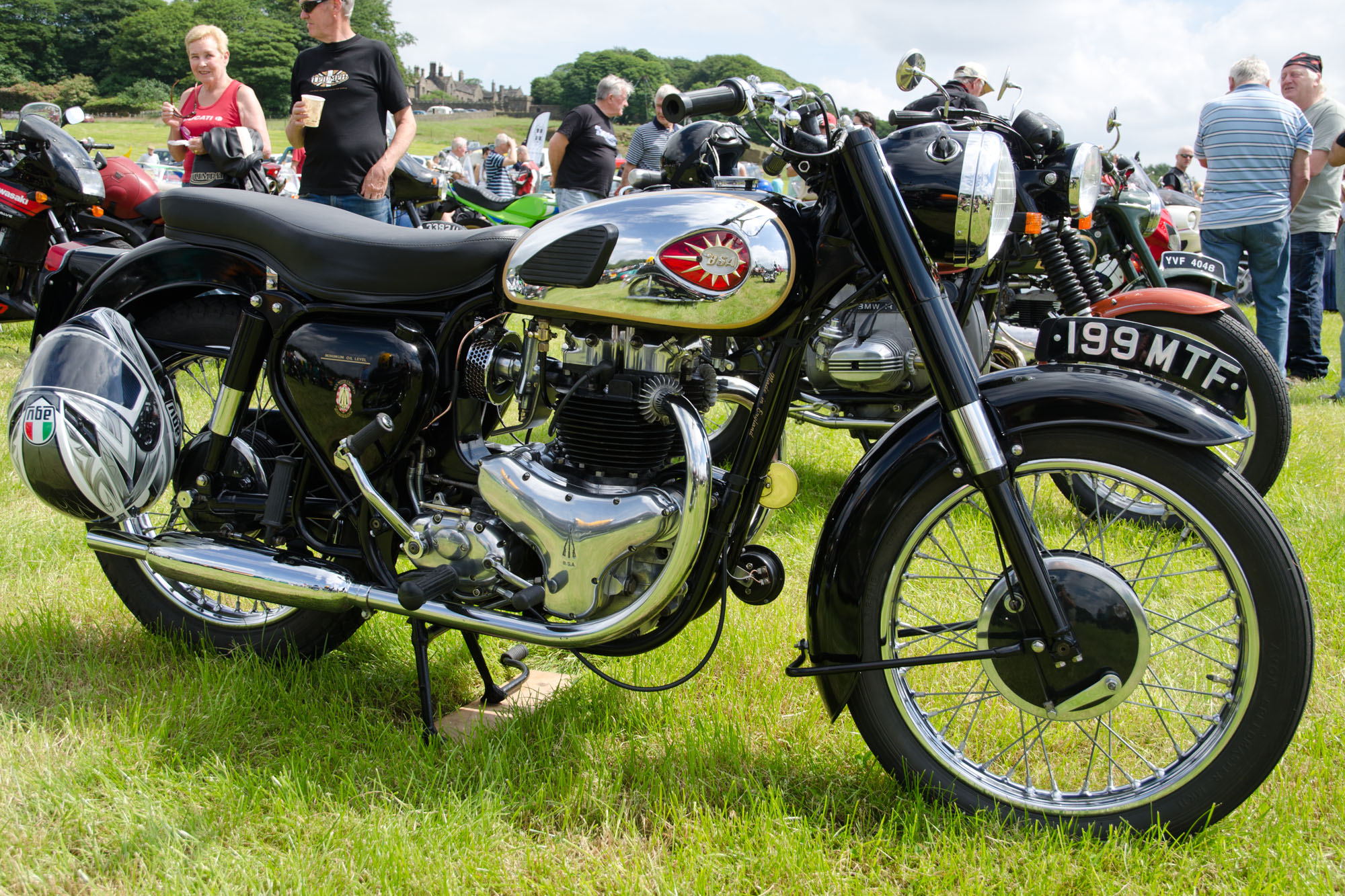
1960 Golden Flash

The BSA Golden Flash, commonly referred to as the Gold Flash, was the first of the series to be launched in 1950. Painted in a new gold colour, 80% of production was destined for the United States. This resulted in long delivery times for British customers, who were offered the model only in black.

Although never designed as a sport motorcycle, the Golden Flash was nonetheless fast for its time and competitive with the Triumph Tiger 100, achieving over 100 miles per hour (160 km/h) in tests in 1950, and covering a standing quarter mile (400 m) in under 16 seconds. Its gold colour proved a marketing success, outselling Triumph's Speed Twin and 6T Thunderbird.

It received updates throughout its model life. In 1960 it was renamed the "Royal Tourist" in the US. An alternator was offered as an alternative to the dynamo from 1961 to 1963, the last three years of production.

=== Super Flash ===
In 1951, BSA Chief designer, Bert Hopwood, went on a fact-finding tour to America and talked to dealers and riders. The feedback he got from the tour was that a more powerful motorcycle would sell well in America. The swinging arm frame and alloy head Road Rocket were planning stages but some way off production.

The BSA competitions department had experience of tuning the existing models. They had tuned versions of the 500 for the Daytona 200 race. Works rider Fred Rist has an A10 desert racer capable of 140 mph, and Gene Thiessen set an AMA class 'B' record at the Bonneville salt flats of 151 mph in October 1951. Hopwood decided to make a faster model by bolting on performance parts to the existing model.

Engine modifications included a 356 race camshaft and an Amal TT carburettor. Power output was 40 bhp (30 kW). The TT carburettor required a kink to be put in the frame's seat post for clearance. The frame also had welded on lugs for rearset footrests. A 2.5 gallon Gold Star tank was fitted and chrome mudguards and stays.

The first Super Flash was shipped to America in February 1953 and American Motorcycling magazine gave it 'Motor of the Month'. The bike was in American showrooms in April that year. Most of the production went to the US, but later in the year models were shipped to Europe, Africa and Australia..

Production continued into 1954, and some swinging arm versions were made in that year. The price was $975 in the US and £325 in Australia. Production stopped in 1954 with the Road Rocket about to go into production. In total about 700 machines were made.

The engine from the Super Flash later powered the Ariel Cyclone.

=== Road Rocket ===
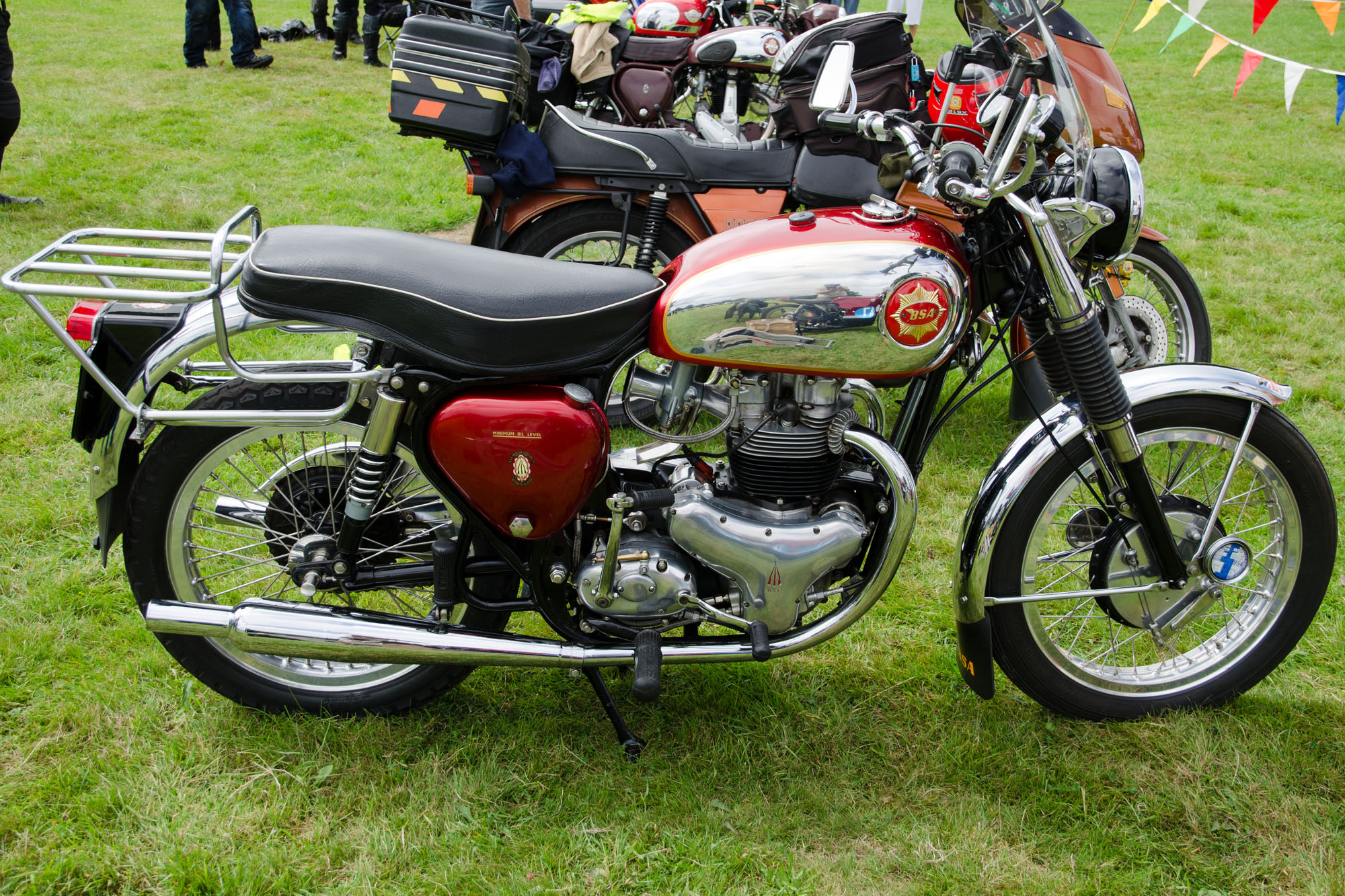
1954 Road Rocket

The Road Rocket was a sports motorcycle developed from the Golden Flash.

Launched as the top of BSA's range in 1954 the BSA Road Rocket was the first A10 engine with an alloy cylinder head. Unlike the Golden Flash, the inlet manifold was separate to the cylinder head enabling twin carburettors to be fitted if required. Standard fitment was an Amal TT carburettor. New "thick flange" cylinders were introduced. (The bottom flange was increased from 3/8" to 1/2" for improved rigidity and reliability.). Big end size was increased from 1.48" to 1.68". High compression pistons and a higher lift camshaft, the 356 "sports" profile, were also fitted. These engine modifications raised the power output to 40 bhp (30 kW) and a top speed of 109 mph (175 km/h).

The model was launched with chrome mudguards and stays and a half-chrome petrol tank. A tachometer was an optional extra.

The Road Rocket was discontinued in 1958 when it was replaced by the Super Rocket.

=== Super Rocket ===
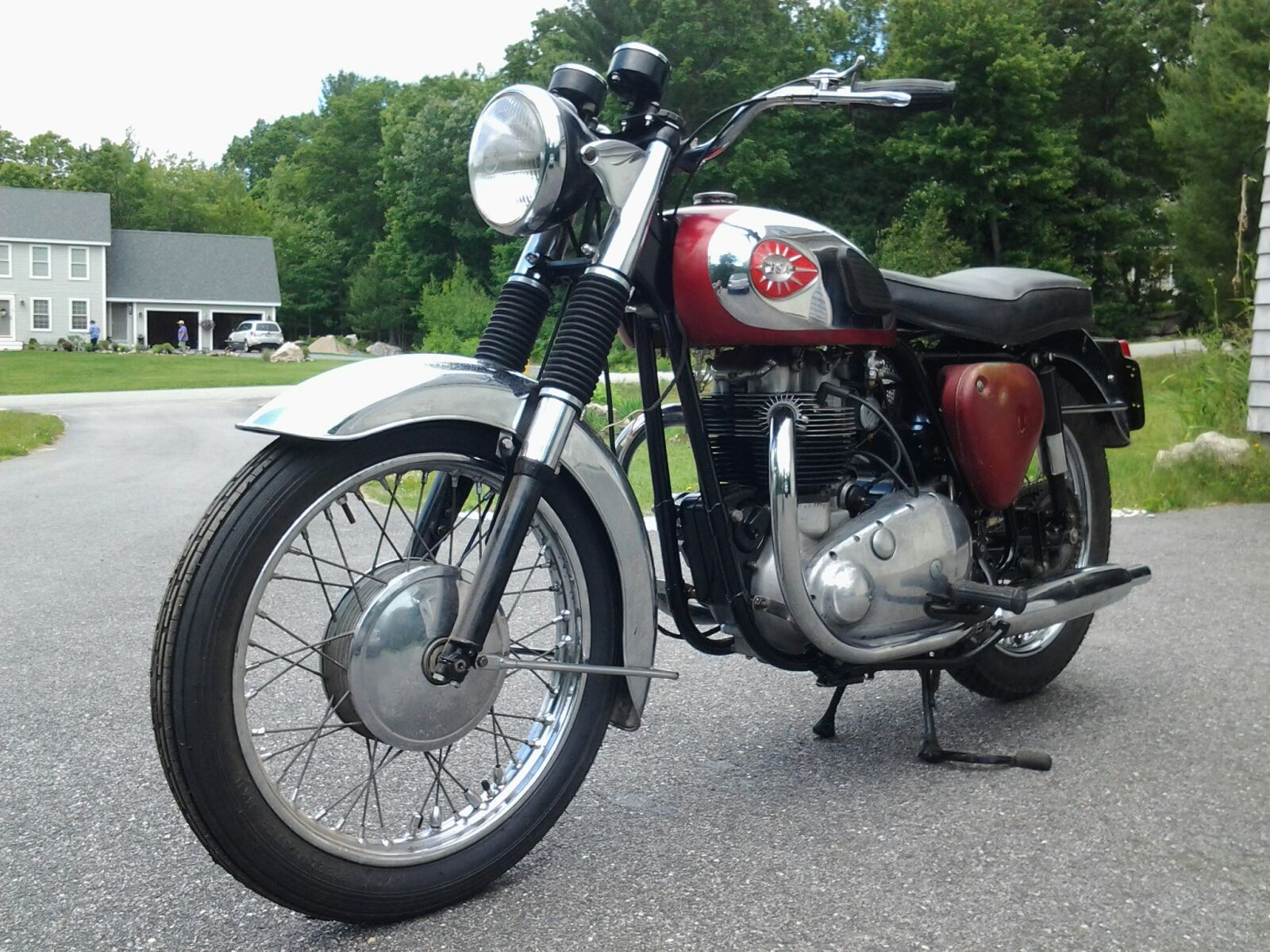
1963 Super Rocket

The Super Rocket was an improved sports model that replaced the Road Rocket in 1958. It retained the Amal TT carburettor and 356 sports cam of the Road Rocket. Compression ratio was raised to 8.5:1 and a new alloy cylinder head fitted. The cylinder head had a cast in inlet manifold and larger ports and valves. The inlet valve was increased from 1.455" to 1.5". The crankshaft was stiffened compared to the previous models. These modifications increased power output to 43 bhp. A lower 1st gear ratio gave increased acceleration off the line.

New brakes were fitted to the model, full width hubs instead of the previous half width items. The front brake was 8" and the rear 7". Both were operated by cables.

The 357 race camshaft was fitted in 1960 and the clutch was improved. A larger 1 5/32" bore Monobloc carburettor fitted in 1962. These raised the power output to 46 bhp (34 kW).

=== Rocket Gold Star ===
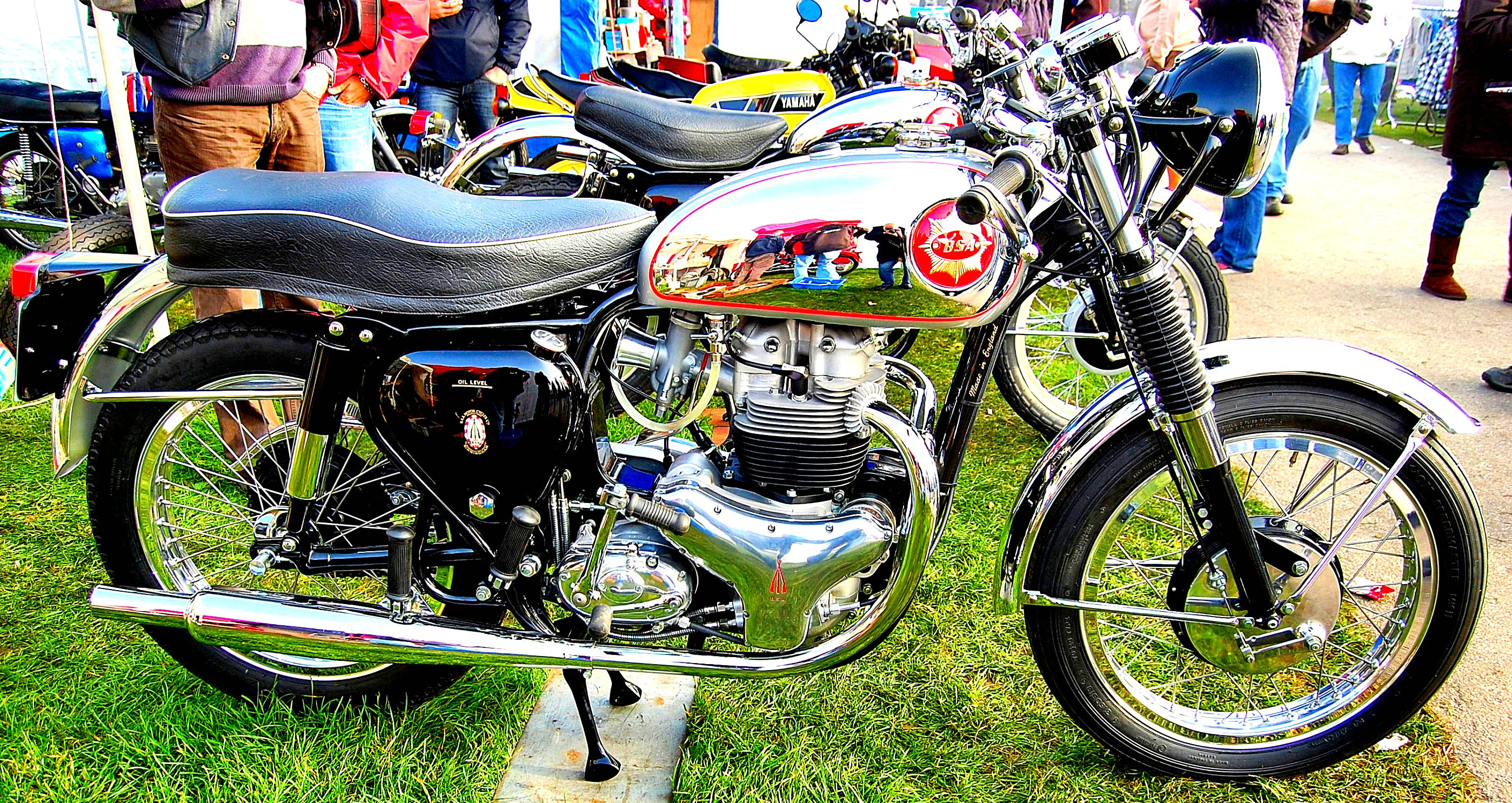
1962 Rocket Gold Star

The Rocket Gold Star was introduced in 1962, using a tuned Super Rocket engine a Gold Star frame. Gold Star tuner and dealer, Eddie Dow, had a customer that wanted to be supplied with a Gold Star fitted with a Super Rocket engine. BSA supplied a Gold Star less engine and a separate Super Rocket engine. Dow assembled the special. The special was well received and the BSA management decided to put the concept into limited production.

The later (1961–1963) 9:1 compression Super Rocket engine was used with a 357 Spitfire camshaft and a 1 5/32" bore Amal Monobloc carburettor which gave 46 bhp (34 kW) as standard. Options such as an Amal GP2 carburettor, siamesed exhaust pipes and a close-ratio RRT2 gearbox could increase this to 50 bhp (37 kW) – and add 30% to the price. The model was also known as the Gold Star Twin. Rocket Gold Star production ended in 1963.

=== Spitfire Scrambler ===
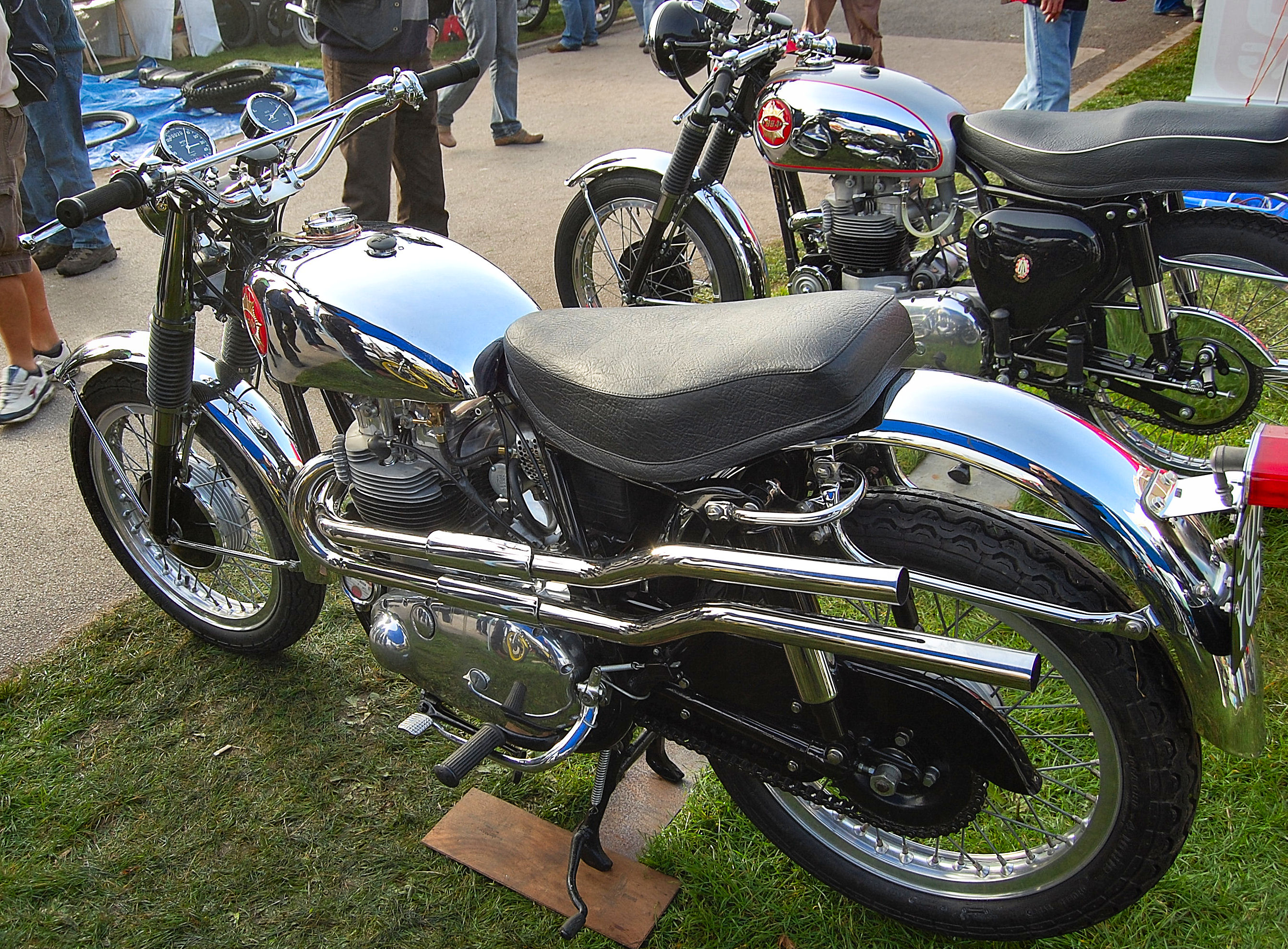
1963 Spitfire Scrambler

The Spitfire Scrambler was introduced in 1957 at the request of BSA's West Coast distributor, Hap Alzina, to meet a need in US desert racing to beat the dominant Triumph twins. The engine was a modified Road Rocket unit. The head was modified to allow a 1 1/16" Amal Monoblock carburettor to be fitted. Compression was raised to 9:1 and a 357 "race" camshaft was fitted. Initially it was thought a special scrambles cam would need to be developed, but the race cam proved to be suitable. The gearbox had wider, scrambles ratios. The frame, forks and wheels initially used were from the Gold Star Catalina, but halfway through 1957 this was changed to an A10 frame. A skid-plate and 2 US gallon petrol tank were fitted. No lights were fitted and the exhausts had no silencers. A Lucas competition magneto was used on this model.

In 1958 the engine gained the 'big valve' head which was also fitted to the newly launched Super Rocket.

A shorter seat was fitted in 1959 and the exhausts were high level on the left hand side. This configuration continued until production ended in 1963. In 1963 the model again used the Gold Star cycle parts after being merged with the Road Gold Star Scrambler and renamed the Gold Star Spitfire Scrambler.

=== Other models ===
==== Ariel Huntmaster ====
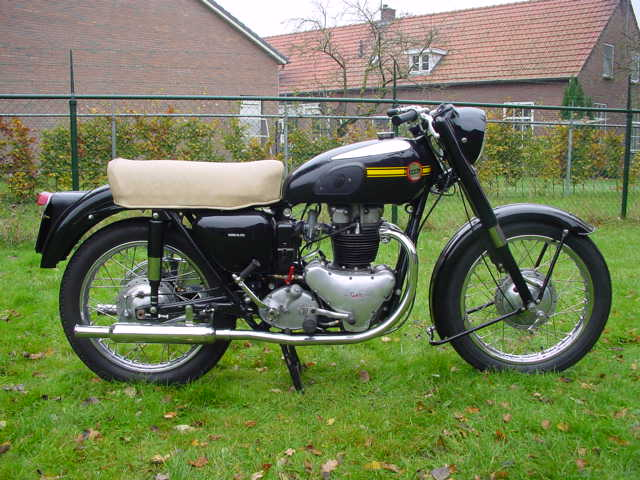
1955 Ariel Huntmaster

Ariel Motorcycles became a subsidiary of BSA in 1951. Although they already had a 500cc twin, the Val Page designed model KH500, the management did not want the expense of developing a 650cc machine. In 1954 an A10 Golden Flash engine, with different outer casings, was fitted to the Ariel frame to create the Ariel Huntmaster. The machine continued until 1959 when all 4-stroke Ariel motorcycles were discontinued.

==== Ariel Cyclone ====
A sporting version of the Huntmaster, the Cyclone was also produced. This used the 40 bhp (30 kW) Super Flash engine, albeit with an Amal Monobloc carburettor fitted instead of the Super Flash's Amal TT version.
