= BSA motorcycles =

Former British motorcycle marque

BSA Motorcycles Ltd
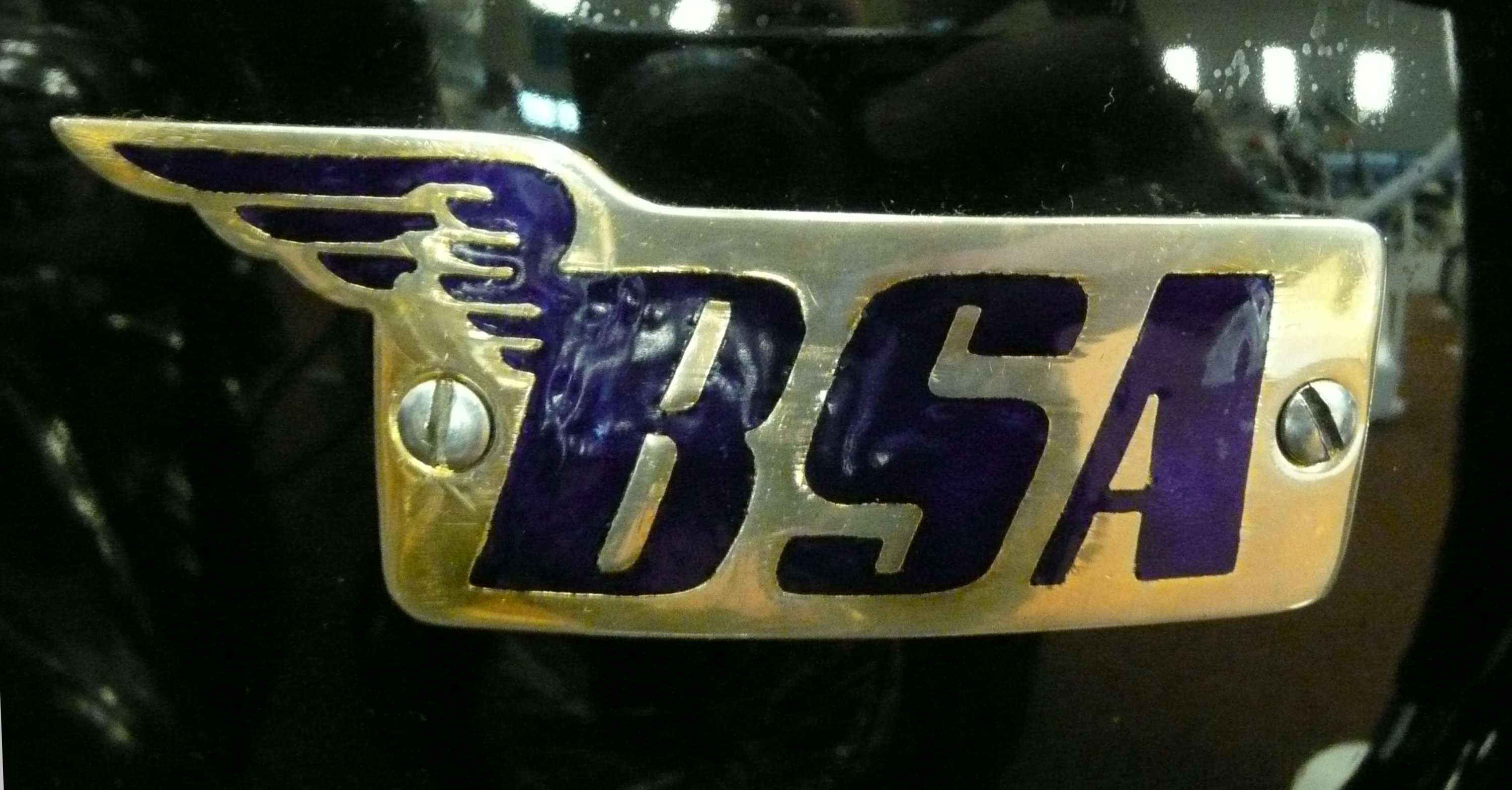
- Industry: Motorcycle
- Founded: 1919
- Defunct: 1972
- Successor: Norton-Villiers-Triumph
- Parent: BSA

BSA motorcycles were made by the Birmingham Small Arms Company Limited (BSA), which was a major British industrial combine, a group of businesses manufacturing military and sporting firearms; bicycles; motorcycles; cars; buses and bodies; steel; iron castings; hand, power, and machine tools; coal cleaning and handling plants; sintered metals; and hard chrome process.

A government-organised rescue operation in 1973 led to the takeover of BSA-Triumph motorcycle operations by Norton-Villiers, later known as Norton Villiers Triumph.

At its peak, BSA (including Triumph) was the largest motorcycle producer in the world. In the late 1950s and early 1960s poor management and failure to develop new products in the motorcycle division led to a dramatic decline of sales to its major USA market. The management had failed to appreciate the importance of the resurgent Japanese motorcycle industry, leading to problems for the entire BSA group.

When Norton Villiers Triumph was liquidated in 1978, the rights to use the brand name of BSA were purchased by a new business, the B.S.A. Company.

== Motorcycles ==
Motor bicycles were added to bicycle products in 1910. The BSA 3 1/2 hp was exhibited at the 1910 Olympia Show, London for the 1911 season. The entire BSA production sold out in 1911, 1912 and 1913.

In November 1919 BSA launched their first 50 degree v-twin, Model E, 770cc side valve (6–7 hp) motorcycle for the 1920 season. The machine had interchangeable valves, total loss oil system with mechanical pump and an emergency hand one. Retail price was £130. Other features were Amal carburettor, chain drive, choice of magneto or Magdyno, 7-plate clutch, 3 speed gear box with kickstarter and new type of cantilever fork

As the result of increased post war demand the Small Heath, Birmingham factory was turned over entirely to motorcycle production.

In 1953 BSA withdrew motorcycle production from BSA Cycles Ltd, the company it had established in 1919, by creating BSA Motorcycles Ltd. BSA also produced its 100,000th BSA Bantam motorcycle, a fact celebrated at the 1953 motorcycle show with a visit by Sir Anthony Eden to the BSA stand.

== Norton-Villiers-Triumph ==
The Group continued to expand and acquire throughout the 1950s, but by 1965 competition from Japan (in the shape of companies like Honda, Yamaha and Suzuki) and Europe from Jawa/CZ, Bultaco and Husqvarna was eroding BSA's market share. The BSA (and Triumph range) were no longer aligned with the markets; mopeds were displacing scooter sales and the trials and scrambles areas were now the preserve of European two-strokes. Some poor marketing decisions and expensive projects contributed to substantial losses. For example, the development and production investment of the Ariel 3, an ultra stable 3-wheel moped, was not recouped by sales; the loss has been estimated at £2 million. Furthermore, BSA failed to take seriously the threat that electric-start Japanese motorcycles might completely destroy the market for kick-started BSA motorcycles.

In 1968, BSA announced many changes to its product line of singles, twins and the new three-cylinder machine named the "Rocket three" for the 1969 model year. It now concentrated on the more promising USA, and to a lesser extent Canadian, markets. However, despite the adding of modern accessories, for example, turn signals and even differing versions of the A65 twins for home and export sale, the damage had been done and the end was near.

Reorganisation in 1971 concentrated motorcycle production at Meriden, Triumph's site, with production of components and engines at BSA's Small Heath. At the same time there were redundancies and the selling of assets. Barclays Bank arranged financial backing to the tune of £10 million.

Upgrades and service bulletins continued until 1972, but the less service-intensive Japanese bikes had by then flooded the market on both sides of the Atlantic. The merger with Norton Villiers was started in late 1972, and for a brief time a Norton 500 single was built with the B50-based unit-single engine, but few if any were sold publicly. The BSA unit-single B50's 500 cc enjoyed much improvement in the hands of the CCM motorcycle company allowing the basic BSA design to continue until the mid to late 1970s in a competitive form all over Europe.

The final BSA range was just four models: Gold Star 500, 650 Thunderbolt/Lightning and the 750 cc Rocket Three. By 1972, BSA was so moribund that, with bankruptcy imminent, its motorcycle businesses were merged (as part of a government-initiated rescue plan) with the Manganese Bronze company, Norton-Villiers, to become NVT, headed by Dennis Poore. The intention was to produce and market Norton and Triumph motorcycles at home and abroad; but Poore's rationalisation led to redundancies of two-thirds of the workforce. In response, the Triumph workers at Meriden set up their own cooperative. This left Poore with neither BSA nor the iconic Triumph Bonneville model and the only NVT models listed for the 1975 model year were the Norton Commando and the Triumph T160 Trident. Although the Commando won the Motor Cycle News "Bike of the Year" award for several years running, nothing could hide the fact that the Commando engine was an old design, being a pre-unit pushrod parallel-twin, notwithstanding its effective and revolutionary vibration-damping 'Isolastic' engine mounting system.

The T160 was an upgraded triple with a host of improvements such as electric starting and all-disc braking whose engine, built at BSA's Small Heath plant, bore, in many ways, a striking similarity to that of the original BSA Rocket 3, being forward-inclined in the frame rather than vertically mounted. This layout was found to give better weight distribution and allowed ancillary components like the starter to be mounted behind the cylinder block, thus apparently vindicating the earlier BSA 'inclined -parallel 3' design.

In exchange for its motorcycle businesses, Manganese Bronze received BSA Group's non-motorcycle-related divisions—namely, Carbodies. Although the BSA name was left out of the new company's name, a few products continued to be made carrying it until 1973. However, the plan involved the axing of some brands, large redundancies and consolidation of production at two sites. This scheme to rescue and combine Norton, BSA and Triumph failed in the face of worker resistance. Norton's and BSA's factories were eventually shut down, while Triumph staggered on to fail four years later.

== Trademarks ==
=== Motorcycles ===
Rights went to Norton Villiers Triumph and on its liquidation were purchased by a new company formed by management and named BSA Company Limited.

=== Motorcycles from 1910 ===
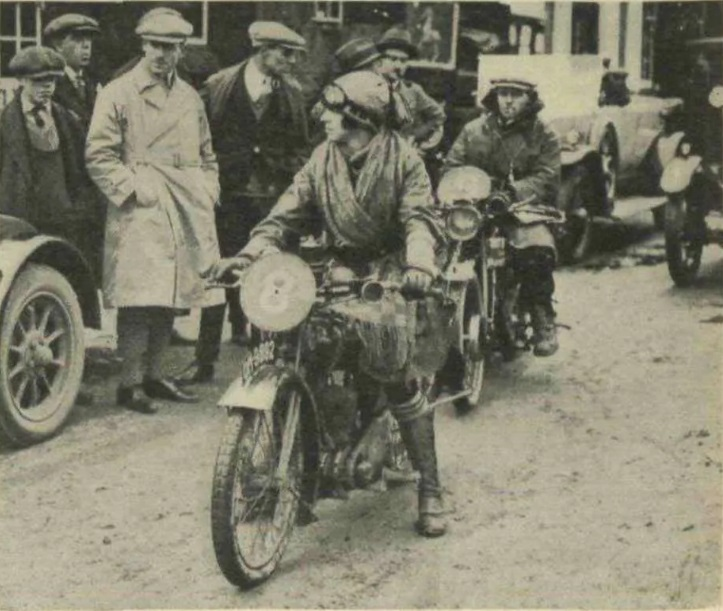
Betty Debenham riding a 249cc BSA motorcycle at a 1926 trial hosted by the Essex Motor Club

BSA Motorcycles were made by BSA Cycles Ltd, under the BSA parent, up until 1953 when the motorcycle business was moved into holding BSA Motorcycles Ltd. The first instance of intention to produce motorcycles was reported in The Motor Cycle, a British motorcycling journal, in July 1906. The first wholly BSA motorcycle, the 3 1/2 H.P. was built in 1910 and displayed at the first Olympia Show, London on 21 November in that year. Sir Hallewell Rogers, BSA Chairman, had informed the shareholders at the company's 1910 AGM in Birmingham "We have decided to put a motor-bicycle on the market for the coming season .... These machines will be on exhibit at the Cycle and Motor Show on November 21st, after which date we look forward to commencing delivery". The machines were available for the 1911 season and entire production sold out. BSA had previously acquired a commercially available engine in 1905 and fitted it to one of their bicycle frames and discovered at first hand the problems that needed to be overcome. BSA Cycles Ltd was set up as a subsidiary company in 1919 under Managing Director Charles Hyde to manufacture both bicycles and motorcycles.

BSA produced their only two-stroke motorcycle design for the 1928 season, the 1.74 H.P. Model A28 with two speed gearbox. It was produced as the A29 and A30 the following two years and became the A31 with a three-speed gearbox in 1931, the last year of production. The first Bantam model was a German DKW design, part of war reparation, and not a true BSA design.

BSA motorcycles were sold as affordable motorcycles with reasonable performance for the average user. BSA stressed the reliability of their machines, the availability of spares and dealer support. The motorcycles were a mixture of sidevalve and OHV engines offering different performance for different roles, e.g. hauling a sidecar. The bulk of use would be for commuting. BSA motorcycles were also popular with "fleet buyers" in Britain, who (for example) used Bantams for telegram delivery for the Post Office or motorcycle/sidecar combinations for AA patrols The Automobile Association (AA) breakdown help services. This mass market appeal meant they could claim "one in four is a BSA" on advertising.

Machines with better specifications were available for those who wanted more performance or for competition work.

Initially, after the Second World War, BSA motorcycles were not generally seen as racing machines, compared to the likes of Norton. In the immediate post-war period few were entered in races such as the TT races, though this changed dramatically in the Junior Clubman event (smaller engine motorcycles racing over some 3 or 4 laps around one of the Isle of Man courses). In 1947 there were but a couple of BSA mounted riders, but by 1952 BSA were in the majority and in 1956 the makeup was 53 BSA, 1 Norton and 1 Velocette.

To improve US sales, in 1954, for example, BSA entered a team of riders in the 200 mile Daytona beach race with a mixture of single cylinder Gold Stars and twin cylinder Shooting Stars assembled by Roland Pike. The BSA team riders took first, second, third, fourth, and fifth places with two more riders finishing at 8th and 16th. This was the first case of a one brand sweep.

Mike Hailwood raced for BSA at the Daytona 200 in 1970 and 1971, but failure of his factory triples meant it was without the success BSA had hoped for. For 1970 BSA (which then owned Triumph) built three Triumph Trident based, and three very similar BSA Rocket 3 based racers in Rob North frames. This was a no-expense spared effort to reclaim the US market after Honda's successful introduction of the CB750. US riders and Daytona 200 specialists were hired, meaning Hailwood was the only British rider in the 1970 team until a seventh bike was built for Percy Tait. However a Honda CB750 ridden by Dick Mann won the race. Returning in 1971 with 10 triples BSA did win the Daytona 200, with a Rocket 3 based racer ridden by Dick Mann who had parted ways with Honda.

The BSA factory experienced success in the sport of motocross with Jeff Smith riding a B40 to capture the 1964 and 1965 FIM 500 cc Motocross World Championships. It would be the last year the title would be won by a four-stroke machine until the mid-1990s. A BSA motocross machine was often colloquially known as a "Beezer."

Birmingham rocker Steve Gibbons released a song "BSA" on his 1980 album "Saints & Sinners" as a tribute to the Gold Star. He still plays this song with his band and often performs on the Isle of Man at the TT races.

=== Motorcycle models ===
==== Pre World War II ====
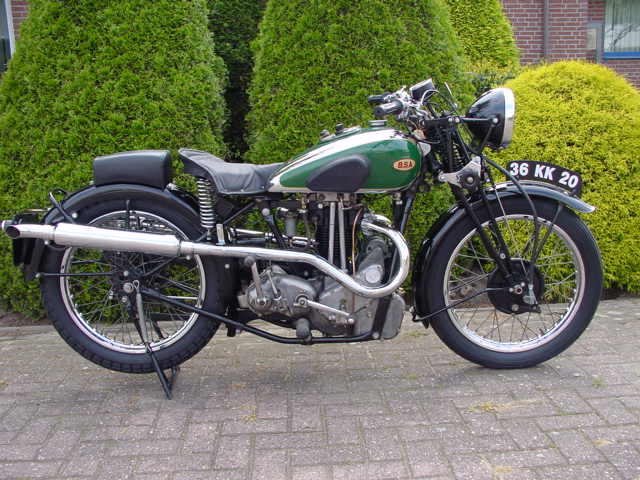
1935 BSA Blue Star

- 3 1/2 hp
- Model E
- Model A28
- C10 sidevalve 250 cc 1938 on design by Val Page
- C11 OHV 250cc: 12 hp (9 kW) – 70 mph (110 km/h) – 85mpg – weight 250 lb (113 kg).
- G14 1000 cc V-twin
- Blue Star
- Empire Star
- Silver Star
- Gold Star
- Sloper
- M20 (500cc):as the WD (War Department) M20 the motorcycle of the British Army in World War II
- M21 (600cc): the big brother of the M20, also used by the British Army in World War II
- M22 (500CC)
- Y13 750cc OHV V-Twin 1936-1938

==== Post World War II ====
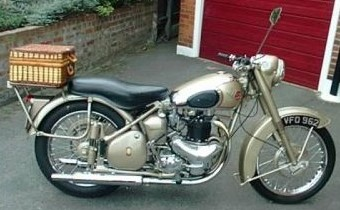
1957 BSA Golden Flash 650

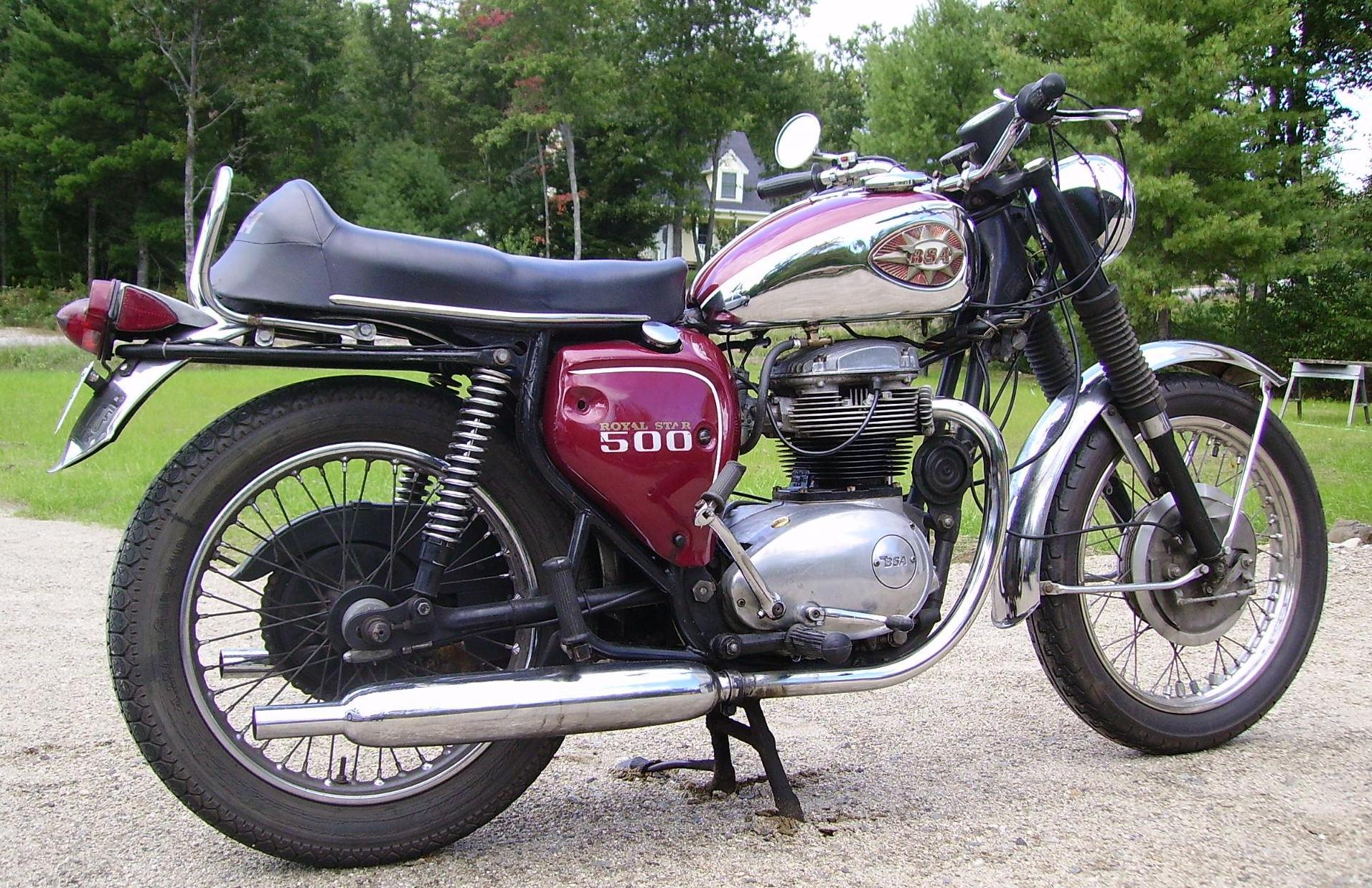
1969 BSA Royal Star

- A series Twins (four-stroke, pushrod parallel twins)
  - A7
    - A7 Shooting Star – 500cc pre-unit construction
  - A10 – 650cc pre-unit construction
    - A10 Golden Flash
    - A10 Super Flash
    - A10 Road Rocket
    - A10 Super Rocket
    - A10 Rocket Gold Star
  - A50 – 500cc unit construction
    - A50R Royal Star
    - A50C Cyclone
    - A50W Wasp
  - A65 – 650cc unit construction
    - A65 Star Twin
    - A65R Rocket
    - A65T Thunderbolt
    - A65L Lightning
    - A65S Spitfire
    - A65H Hornet
    - A65F Firebird Scrambler
  - A70L Lightning 750
- Triples (four-stroke, pushrod, three-cylinder engines) – The BSA Rocket 3/Triumph Trident were developed together. The Rocket 3 shares a majority of engine components and other parts with the Trident T150, but has forward-inclined cylinder barrels and a BSA frame.
  - A75R Rocket3 750
  - A75RV Rocket3 750 – 5 speed
  - A75V Rocket3 750 – 5 speed
- Singles (Four-stroke single cylinder)
  - C25 Barracuda
  - B25 Starfire – 250cc unit construction
  - B25FS Fleetstar
  - B25 SS Gold Star
  - BSA B31 single
  - B32 Gold Star
  - B33
  - B34 Gold Star
  - B40 350 Star – 350cc unit construction
  - B40 SS90
  - B44 Victor
  - B44
    - B44SS Shooting Star
    - B44VS Victor Special
  - B50
    - B50SS Gold Star 500
    - B50T Victor Trials
    - B50MX Motocross
- C series (Four-stroke 250 cc single-cylinder).
  - C10
  - C11/C11G: 12 hp (9 kW) – 70 mph (110 km/h) – 85mpg – weight 250 lb (113 kg).

The C11 used a C10 motor fitted with an overhead valve cylinder head. The C11 frame was almost unchanged until 1951 when BSA added plunger rear suspension. Early gearboxes were weak and unreliable. The C11G was available with a three ratio gearbox and rigid frame or a four ratio gearbox and a plunger frame. Both models had better front brakes than earlier models. This model was a common commuter motorcycle, and many survive today.

  - C12

(1956–1958). 249 cc OHV

Used the C11G engine, fitted with an alternator and swinging fork (known as swinging arm) rear suspension.

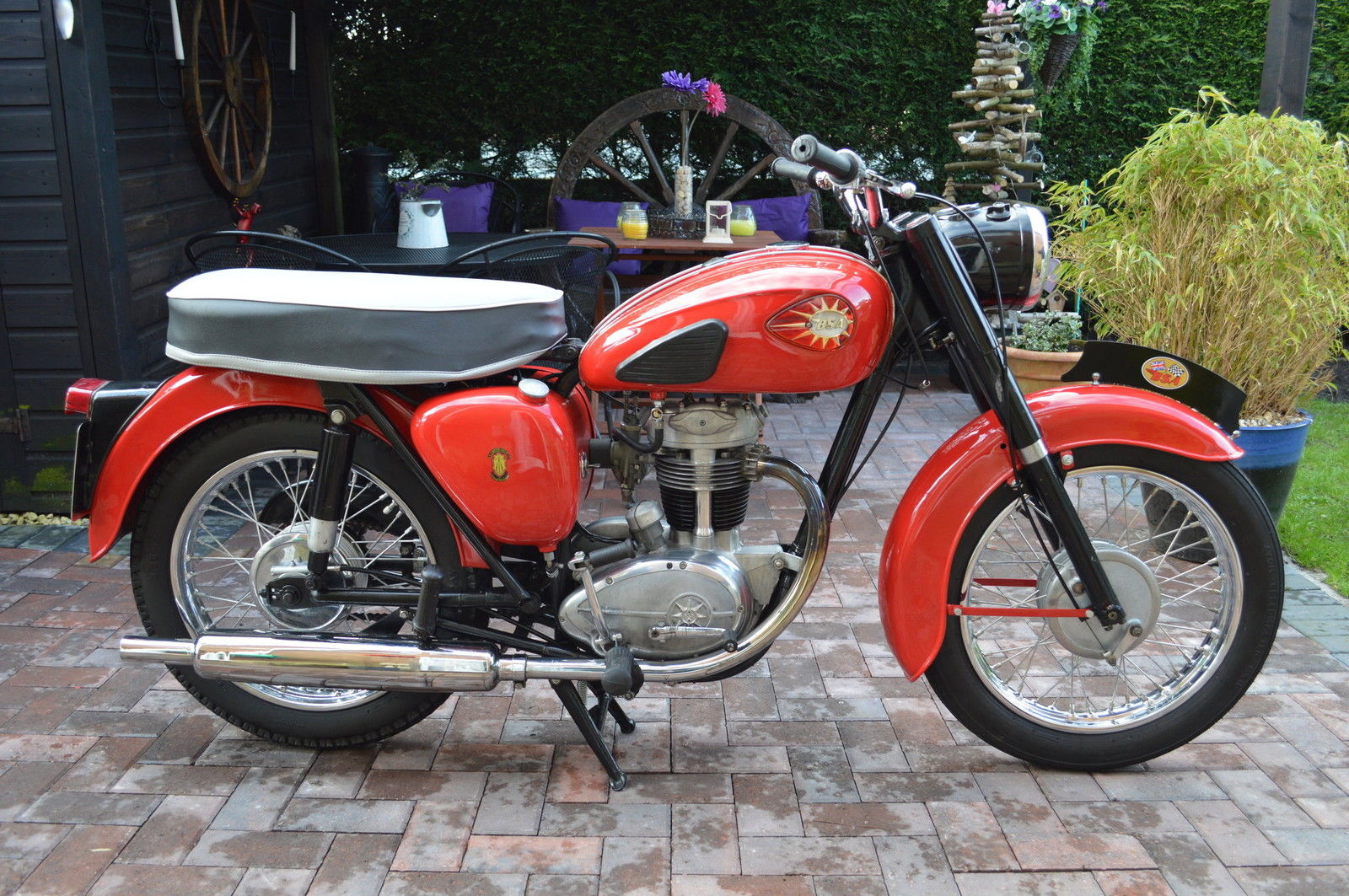
1959 BSA C15 Star

  - C15 Star – 250cc unit construction
  - C15T Trials
  - C15S Scrambler
  - C15SS80 Sports Star 80
  - C15 Sportsman
- D series (Two-stroke single cylinder. See BSA Bantam for details)
  - D1 Bantam – 125cc unit-construction
  - D3 Bantam Major
  - D5 Bantam Super
  - D7 Bantam Super
  - D10 Silver Bantam, Bantam Supreme, Bantam Sports, Bushman
  - D13
  - D14/4 Bantam Supreme, Bantam Sports, Bushman – 175cc
  - B175 Bantam Sports, Bushman
- Others (may include some export versions of models listed above)
  - B31 Twin (350 cc). B31 frame fitted with a Triumph 3T motor to produce this BSA B31 Twin. Very few units were produced, probably prototypes.
  - BSA Barracuda
  - BSA Beagle
  - BSA Boxer – 1979 – c.1981 the sports version of the 50cc range (Beaver, Boxer, Brigand, GT50). The engine was by Moto Morini.
  - BSA GT50 (renamed from the Boxer)
  - BSA Beaver (the standard road version)
  - BSA Tracker 125/175 – late 70s moto-cross style product by NVT with Yamaha two stroke engine.
  - BSA Dandy 70
  - BSA Sunbeam (Scooters, also produced as Triumph TS1, TW2 Tigress)
    - 175B1
    - 250B2
  - BSA Starfire
  - BSA Rocket Scrambler
  - BSA Rocket Gold Star
  - BSA Fury
  - BSA Hornet
  - Winged Wheel (auxiliary power unit for bicycles)
  - T65 Thunderbolt (essentially a Triumph TR6P with BSA Badges)

At the time of the company's demise, BSA engineers were developing a range of new two-strokes from 100 - 400 cc, a 350 cc 4-valve DOHC single and a wankel engine. The wankel engine would later be used in Norton machines.

== See also ==
- Clews Competition Motorcycles (CCM) – the remnants of BSA's off-road arm
- List of BSA motorcycles
