= BSA A65 =

BSA A65 may refer to a number of motorcycle models produced by the Birmingham Small Arms Company (BSA):

- BSA A65 Star
- BSA A65 Rocket
- BSA Hornet
- BSA Lightning
- BSA Lightning Clubman
- BSA Lightning Rocket
- BSA Spitfire
- BSA Thunderbolt

== See also ==
- BSA unit twins
- Kirby BSA sidecar outfit
