= T65 =

T65 may refer to:

- T65 (cartridge), an experimental rifle cartridge
- BSA T65 Thunderbolt, a motorcycle
- Continental T65, a tuboshaft engine
- Cooper T65, a racing car
- INS Bangaram (T65), a patrol vessel of the Indian Navy
- Slingsby T.65 Vega, a glider
- T65 assault rifle
- T65 Gun Motor Carriage
- T65 telephone
- T-65 X-Wing Fighter, a fictional vehicle in the Star Wars franchise
