= Kirby BSA sidecar outfit =

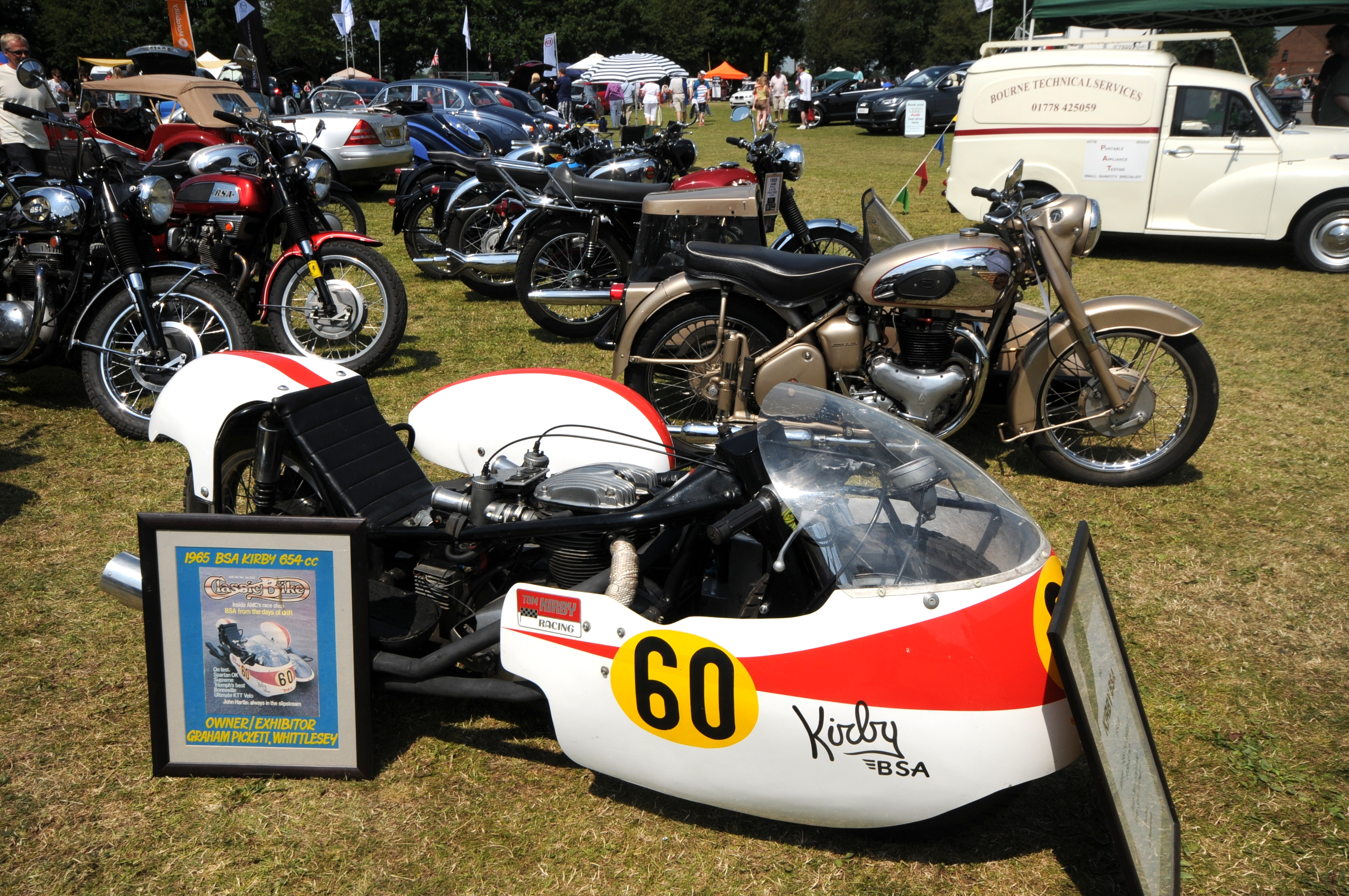
- Baston Car Show exhibits in 2013
- Manufacturer: BSA
- Production: 1965–1966
- Class: 500cc Sidecar (B2A)
- Engine: 654 cc (39.9 cu in) air cooled four stroke, parallel twin, OHV, 2 valves per cylinder, 2 Amal 10GP2 carburettors, five pints of oil
- Bore / stroke: 75 mm × 74 mm (3.0 in × 2.9 in)
- Power: 54 bhp (40 kW) @ 6900 rpm
- Transmission: 4-speed, chain drive
- Frame type: Steel tubing, cradle, adjusted to accommodate sidecar
- Suspension: Telescopic forks with coil spring – hydraulically damped (front); Coil spring/hydraulically damped (rear)
- Fuel capacity: 4 imp gal (4.8 US gal; 18 L)

The Kirby BSA sidecar outfit was custom-built as a racing sidecar outfit, specifically designed and developed to compete in the F.I.M. Sidecar World Championship between 1965 and 1973, and built between 1965 and 1966. It was powered by a 654 cc (39.9 cu in) engine from the BSA Spitfire.

The driver, Terry Vinicombe, and passenger John Flaxman were sponsored by Hornchurch, Essex-based motorcycle dealer and farmer Tom Kirby, who also ran a stable of solo racing motorcycles and had promoted Alf Hagon and eventual world champions Mike Hailwood, Phil Read, and Bill Ivy.

The outfit won the large-capacity sidecar event at the 1968 Isle of Man TT races.
