= BSA Lightning Clubman =

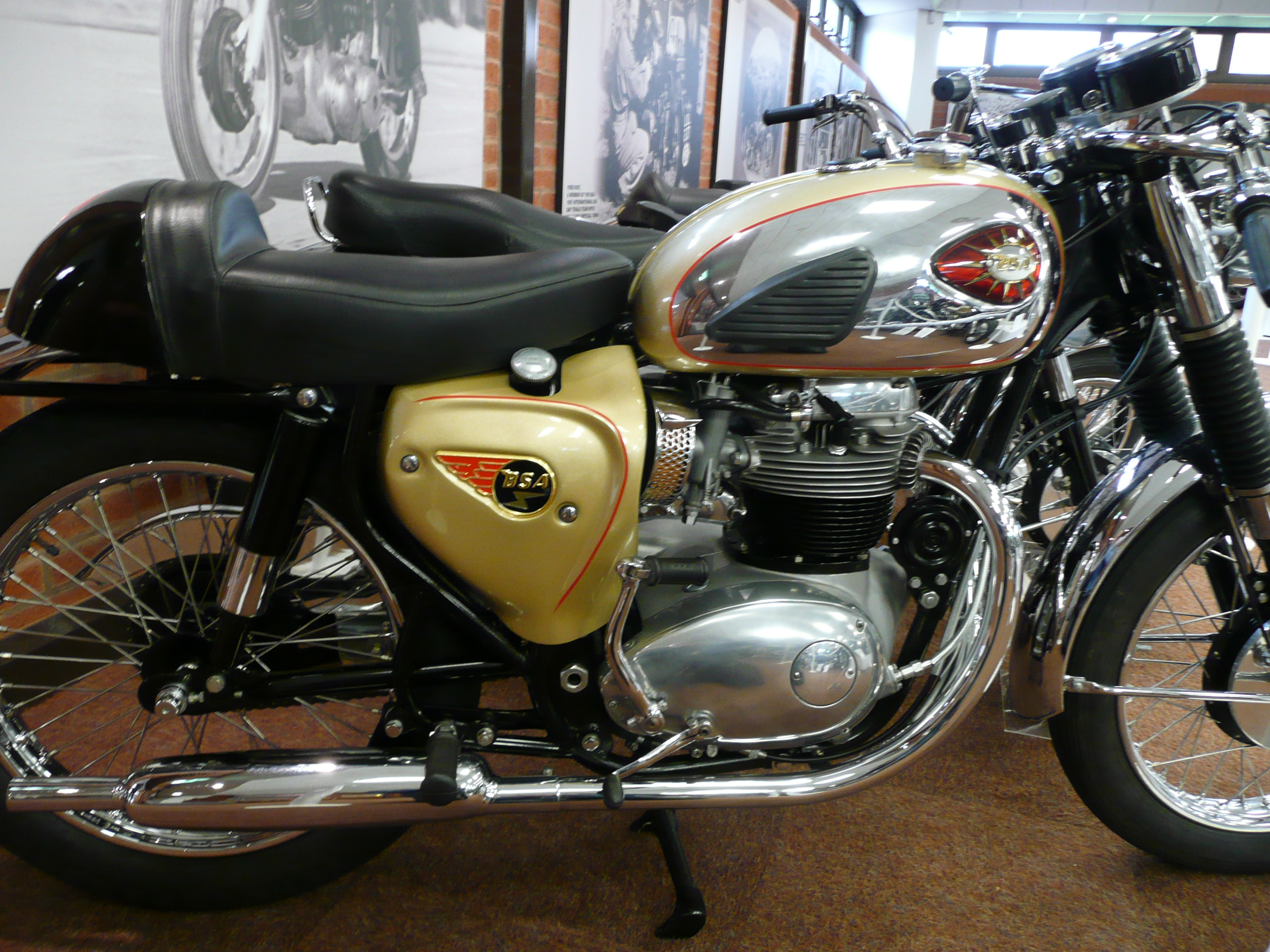
- Manufacturer: BSA, Birmingham
- Also called: A65LC
- Production: 1964-65
- Successor: BSA Spitfire
- Engine: 654 cc, OHV parallel twin, twin carburettor head with Amals
- Top speed: 120 mph
- Power: 51 bhp
- Transmission: Four speed gearbox to chain final drive
- Brakes: drum brakes
- Wheelbase: 56 inches (140 cm)
- Seat height: 32.3 inches (82 cm)
- Weight: 395 lb (179 kg) (dry)
- Related: racing seat, rear set footrests, low 'clubman' handlebars

The BSA Lightning Clubman was a 650cc British motorcycle made by BSA at their factory in Birmingham between 1964 and 1965. Finished in gold and black the Lightning Clubman is now a highly sought after classic motorcycle. Due to the very limited production numbers replicas are created by enthusiasts from the BSA Lightning.

The equivalent 500cc version was called Cyclone.

== Development ==
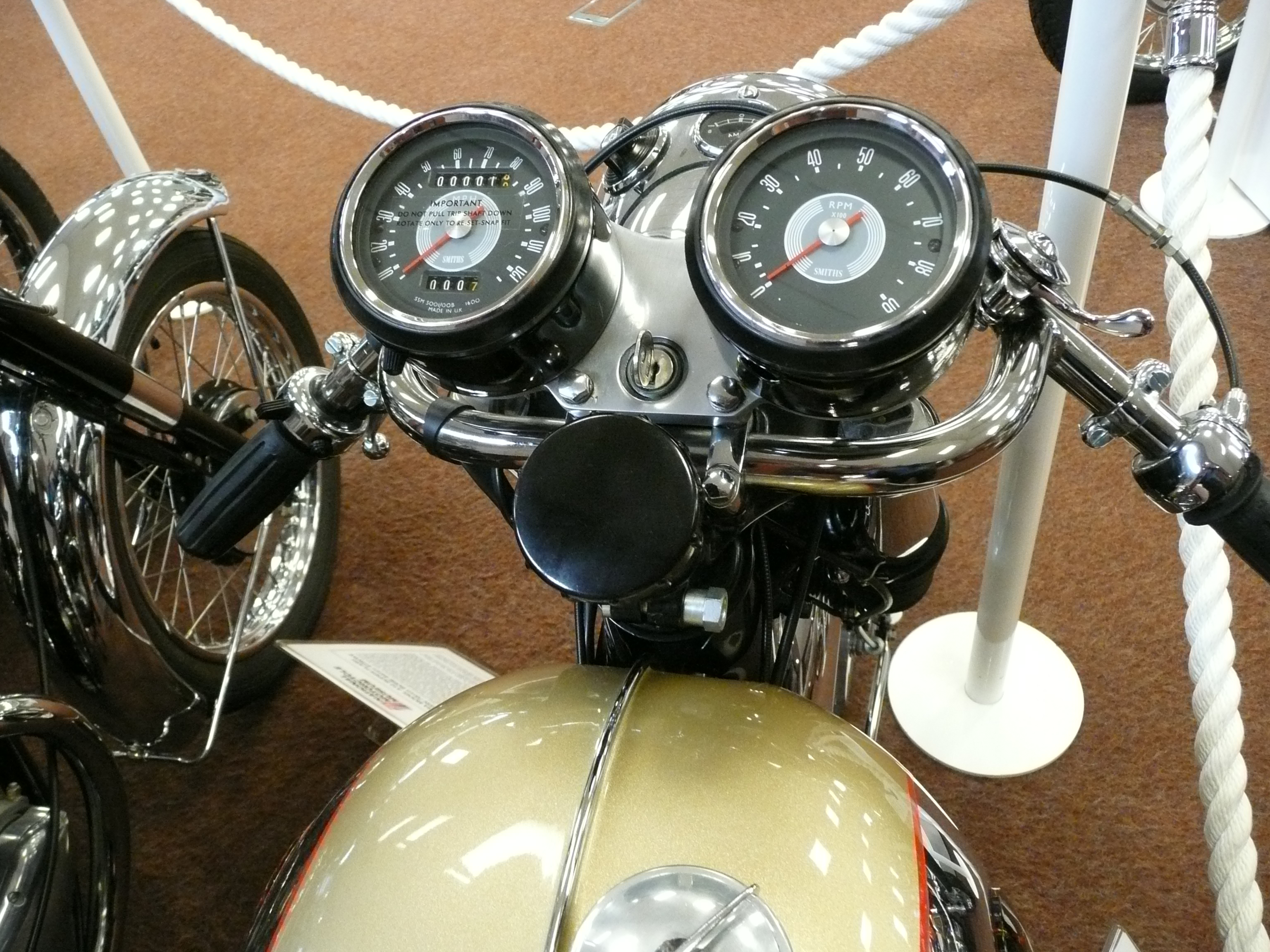
BSA Lightning Clubman

The BSA Lightning Clubman was developed from the BSA Lightning and designed as a Production racing motorcycle, with a special gold and black paint scheme, 'drop handlebars', rearset footrests, a cranked kick-start, twin carburettors, 'siamese' two into one exhaust system (with a less restrictive silencer), a single seat and close-ratio gears fitted as standard. With a top speed (in the right conditions) of 120 mph, it competed against the Triumph Bonneville as the top bikes of the 1960s.

Launched in September 1964, the Lightning Clubman was only in production until October 1965, resulting in a limited production run of 200 machines, so original Clubman models are highly sought after. The BSA Spitfire replaced the Lightning Clubman as BSA's highest-performance machine in 1966.

== Racing success ==
World motorcycle champion Mike Hailwood won the 1965 Hutchinson 100 Production race at the Silverstone racecourse on a BSA Lightning Clubman in heavy rain, beating the Triumph racing team's Bonnevilles. The 'Hutch' was the main production race of the season, so it was very important to manufacturers to establish the racing credentials of their latest range. Triumph Bonnevilles were ridden by World Champion Phil Read and Triumph employee/works rider Percy Tait. BSA Lightning Clubmans were ridden by Grand Prix champion Hailwood (with a large number 1 on the fairing) and factory rider Tony Smith. Conditions were poor and Smith was out of the race at slippery Stowe Corner. With little regard for the rain Hailwood was achieving laps of 83 mph to establish his winning lead.
