= BSA B31 =

British motorcycle

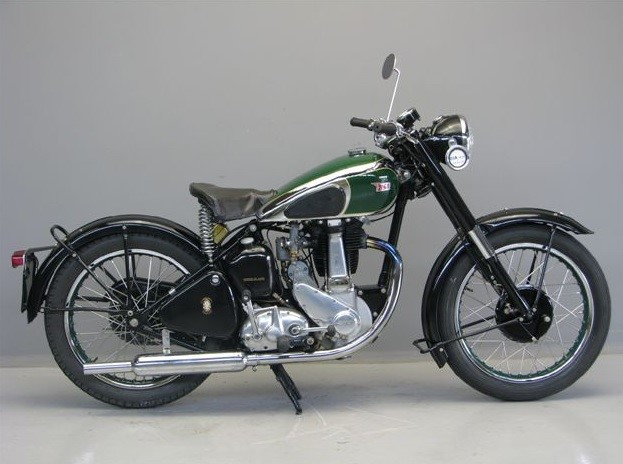
- 1949 BSA B31
- Manufacturer: BSA motorcycles
- Parent company: Birmingham Small Arms Company
- Production: 1945-1959
- Assembly: Small Heath, Birmingham, England
- Predecessor: BSA B38
- Successor: BSA B40
- Engine: 348 cc (21.2 cu in) air-cooled single-cylinder OHV four-stroke
- Bore / stroke: 71 mm × 88 mm (2.8 in × 3.5 in)
- Compression ratio: 6.5:1
- Power: 17 bhp (13 kW) @ 5,500rpm
- Ignition type: Magneto
- Fuel delivery: 1 in (25 mm) Amal carburettor
- Transmission: Wet clutch, 4 speed gearbox, chain drive
- Suspension: Front: Telescopic forks
- Brakes: Drums front & rear
- Tyres: 325x19 front & rear
- Fuel capacity: 3 imp gal (14 L; 3.6 US gal)

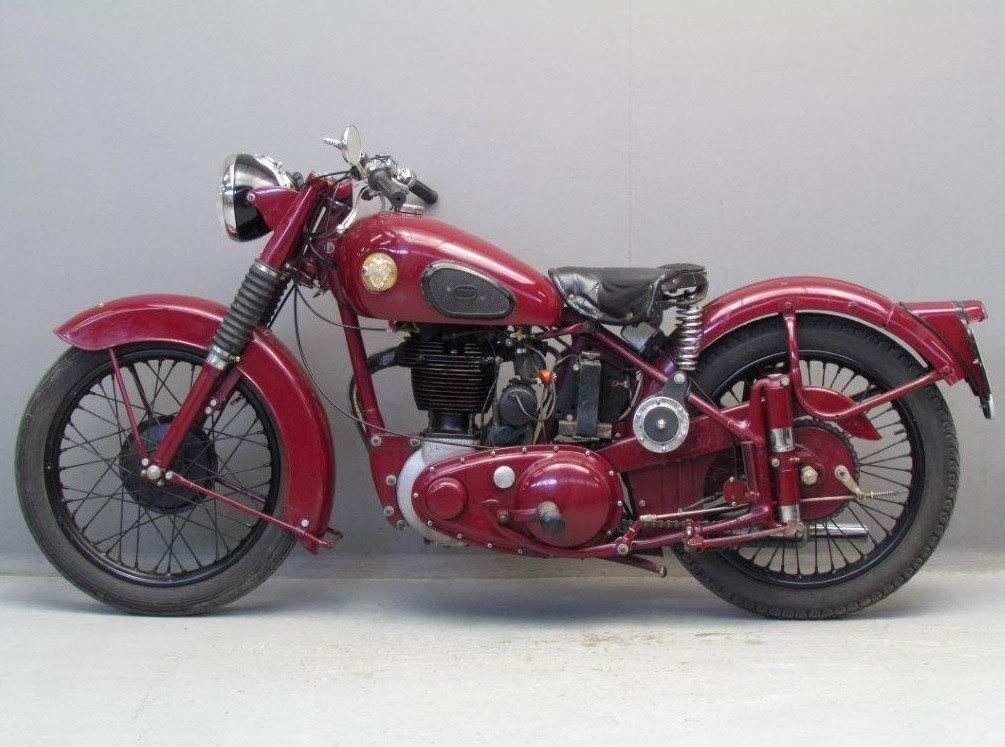
1954 BSA B31 with plunger suspension

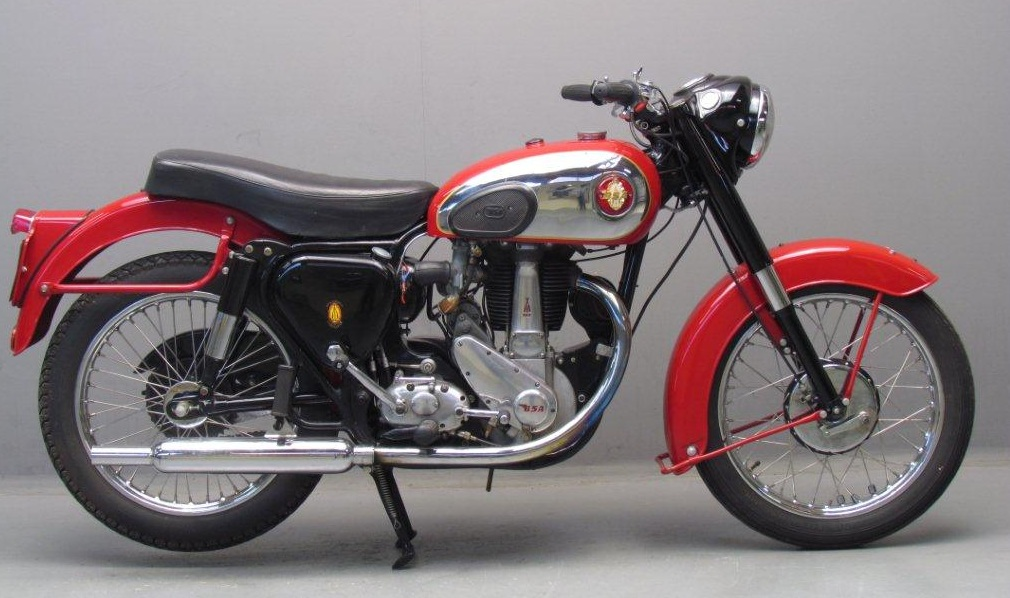
1954 BSA B31 with swinging arm suspension

The BSA B31 is a 350 cc (21 cu in) pre-unit single-cylinder OHV four-stroke motorcycle that was made by Birmingham Small Arms Company (BSA) at its factory in Armoury Road, Small Heath, Birmingham. It was the first new motorcycle introduced by BSA after WW2 and produced from 1945 to 1959.

== History ==
The B31 has its origins in the 1937 Silver Star, designed by Val Page. A revised version, the B29, which used an 'M series' bottom end with a cast iron OHV top end, went into production in late 1939 but few were made before production of civilian motorcycle was halted and production of military motorcycles started. A version of the B29 was offered to the army and designated the B30. Although the army placed an order for the B30, it was later changed to an order for the M20 side-valve. Development of the B30 continued during the war years with Joe Craig and Edward Turner working on it, the latter redesigning the cylinder head to use conventional coil valve spring rather than the original hairpin springs.

At the end of hostilities civilian production resumed and the 350 single, now designated B31, introduced in August 1945. The machines had a single downtube rigid frame and, new for BSA, telescopic forks. (Note: Some sources give the BSA forks as being copies of the Matchless forks.) The speedometer was mounted in the petrol tank. This was moved to the top of the forks in 1948.

Early in 1946 a competition version, the B32, (Note: The B32 and the competition version of the B33, the B34, ultimately evolved into the Gold Star.) was announced. It had lighter chrome mudguards, a high level exhaust and lower gearing. The following year a 500 cc (31 cu in) version, the B33, was introduced with the bore increased from 71 to 85 mm (2.8 to 3.3 in).

The more substantial frame was introduced in 1949 and a plunger frame was offered as on option. In 1951 a dualseat became the standard fitment.

In 1954 a swinging arm frame was offered for an extra £12. The all-welded frame was of the same type as used on the Gold Star and the A series twins. The gearbox from the A series twin was also fitted. The rigid frame was discontinued in 1954 and the following year the swinging arm frame became the standard fitment along with a dual seat. The plunger frame was discontinued at the end of 1955.

Full width Ariel (Note: British industrialist Jack Sangster had sold Ariel to the BSA Group in 1943 and sold Triumph to them in 1951) hubs were introduced in 1956 along with a quickly detachable rear wheel. Brakes from Triumph were fitted in 1958.

The electrics were changed in 1958 with an alternator and coil ignition replacing the Lucas magdyno. This necessitated moving the transmission shock absorber from the end of the crankshaft to the centre of the clutch.

Production of the B31 ended in September 1959.
