= BSA C12 =

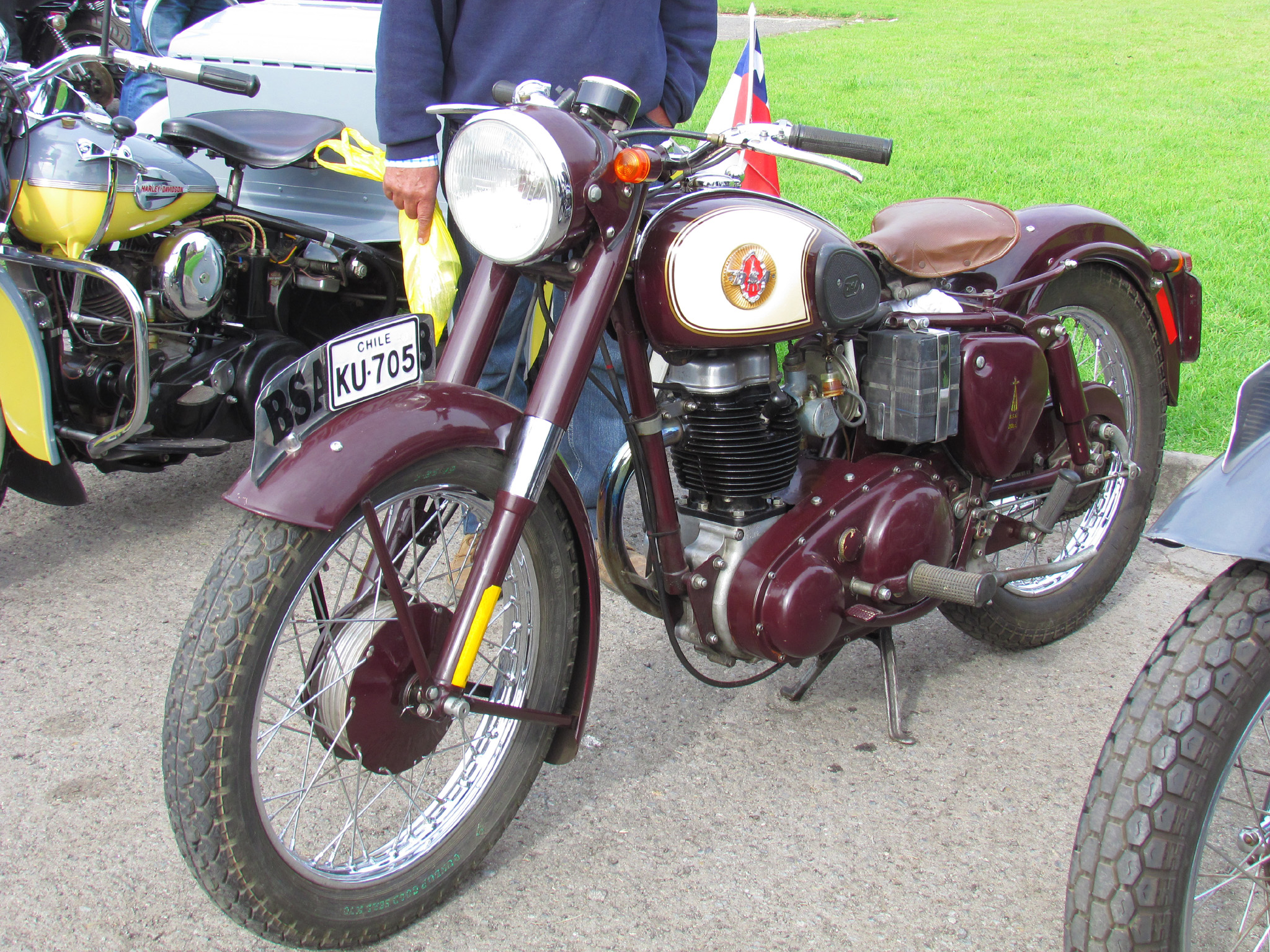
- Manufacturer: BSA
- Production: 1956-1958
- Predecessor: BSA C11G
- Successor: BSA C15
- Engine: 249cc OHV single-cylinder engine
- Power: 12 bhp
- Transmission: Duplex primary chain

The BSA C12 was a British pre-unit motorcycle manufactured by the Birmingham Small Arms Company from 1956 to 1958.

The C12 used the same engine as the earlier C11G with the four-speed gearbox, but in a more modern chassis featuring a swinging arm rear suspension. Minor engine modifications meant it was also far more reliable.
