= T65 telephone =

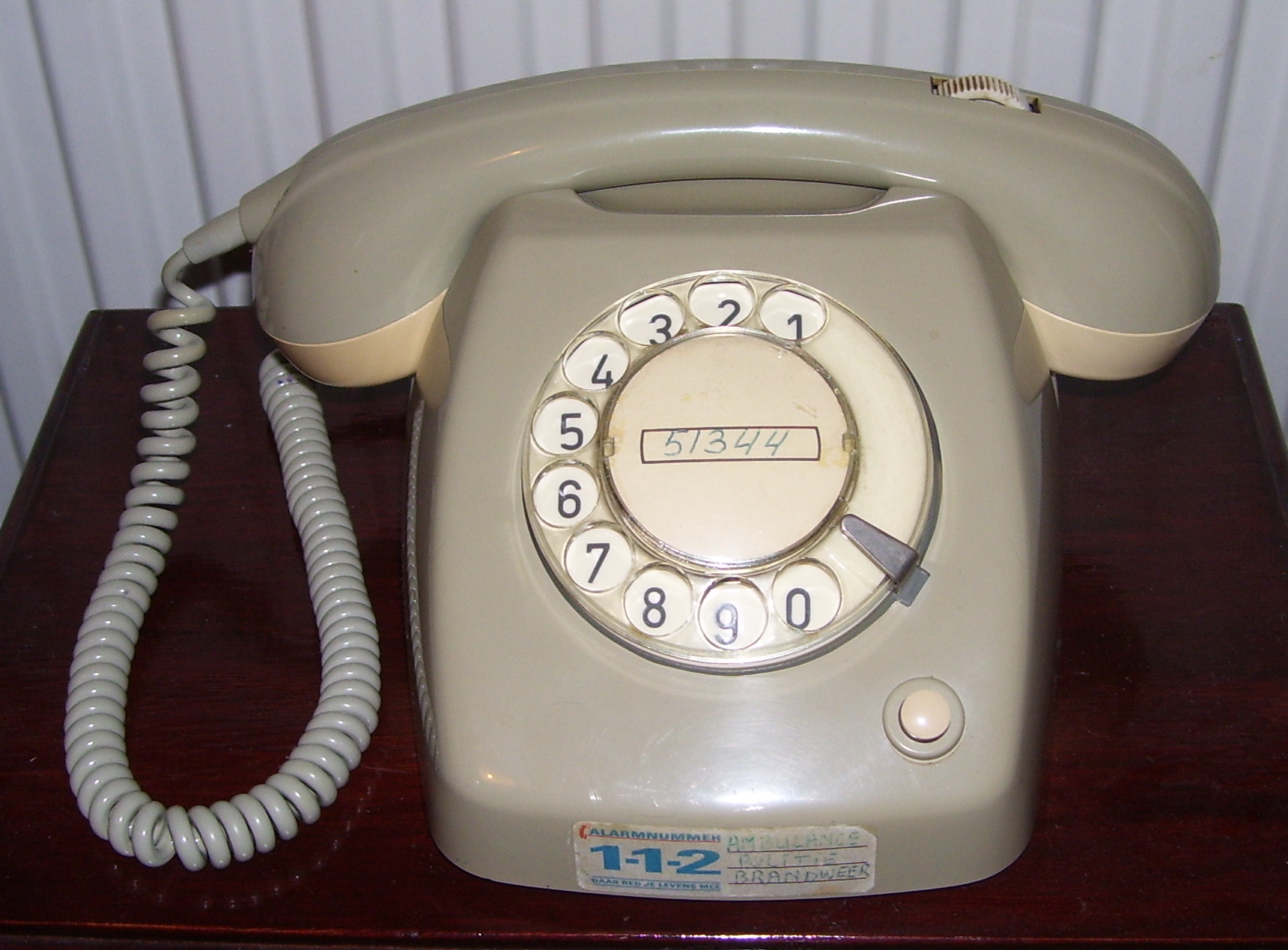
The T65 telephone, this specific version includes an amplifier for hearing disabled people (the wheel on the receiver)

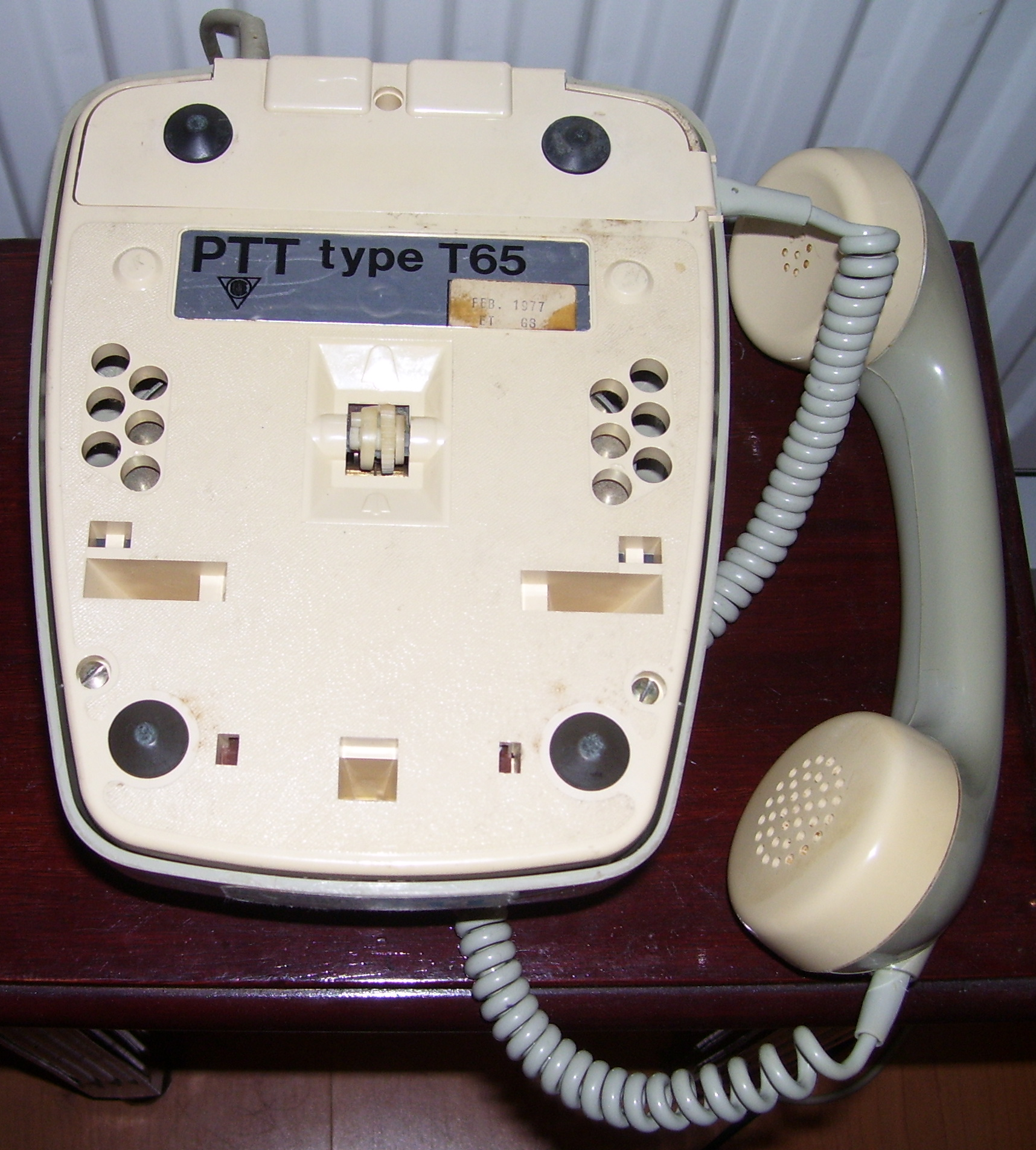
Bottom side of the T65 telephone. The characteristic PTT sticker can be seen, as well as the sticker with the production year. In the centre of the bottom plate the dial for adjustment of the loudness of the bell is seen

The T65 telephone was introduced in 1965 in the Netherlands as the standard telephone installed by the PTT (today KPN).
