= BSA Model E =

British motorcycle from the 1920s

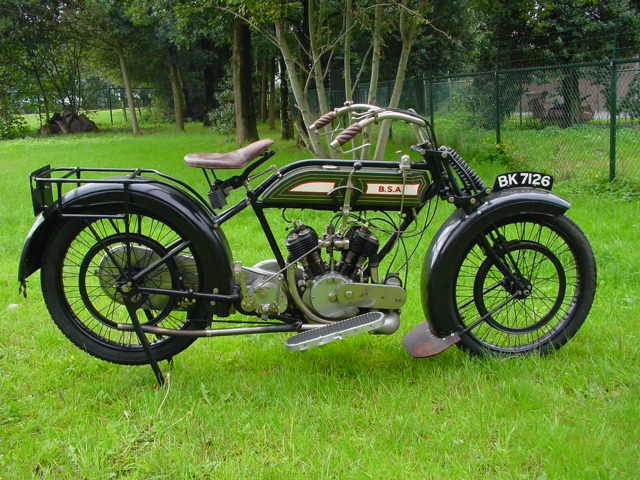
- Manufacturer: BSA
- Also called: Type A
- Production: 1919-1924
- Engine: 770cc side valve v-twin
- Power: 6hp
- Transmission: Three speed to chain final drive
- Weight: 350 lb (160 kg) (dry)

The BSA Model E was a British V-twin motorcycle manufactured by Birmingham Small Arms Company (BSA) at their factory in Armoury Road, Small Heath, Birmingham from 1919. It was often used with the matching BSA sidecar.

== Development ==
After having been turned over to weapons production for World War I, BSA returned to producing motorcycles again which were sold as affordable with reasonable performance for the average user. BSA stressed the reliability of their machines, the availability of spares and dealer support. The BSA Model E was the first of a series of successful V-twins based around the reliable 770cc side valve engine with cylinders at an angle of 50 degrees. The modest 6hp produced by the engine was able to provide a top speed of 55mph and it had BSA's own design of three speed gearbox with the drive chain enclosed in an aluminium casing. There was an increased demand for affordable transport after the end of the war and the Model E became popular with BSA's matching green and cream painted sidecar option.

Designed for easy servicing the valves were interchangeable and had quickly adjustable tappets. The constant-loss oil pump was supplemented by a hand-operated pump, and the wheels were also quickly detachable and the same size so that they were interchangeable.

Although the BSA Model E was produced until 1924, it had been largely replaced by the more powerful 986cc Model F in 1922, which continued in production as the BSA Model G, with continual modifications, until just after the outbreak of World War II.

== Three-wheeled taxi ==
Between 1920 and 1925 BSA produced a 100 small three-wheeled taxi cabs using the Model E 770cc V twin engine.

== Media appearances ==
A 1919 BSA Model E complete with matching sidecar featured in a car chase in the 1965 movie Those Magnificent Men in Their Flying Machines, where it was ridden by lead actor Stuart Whitman who played American cowboy Orvil Newton.
