= BSA Hornet =

BSA Spitfire Hornet and Hornet
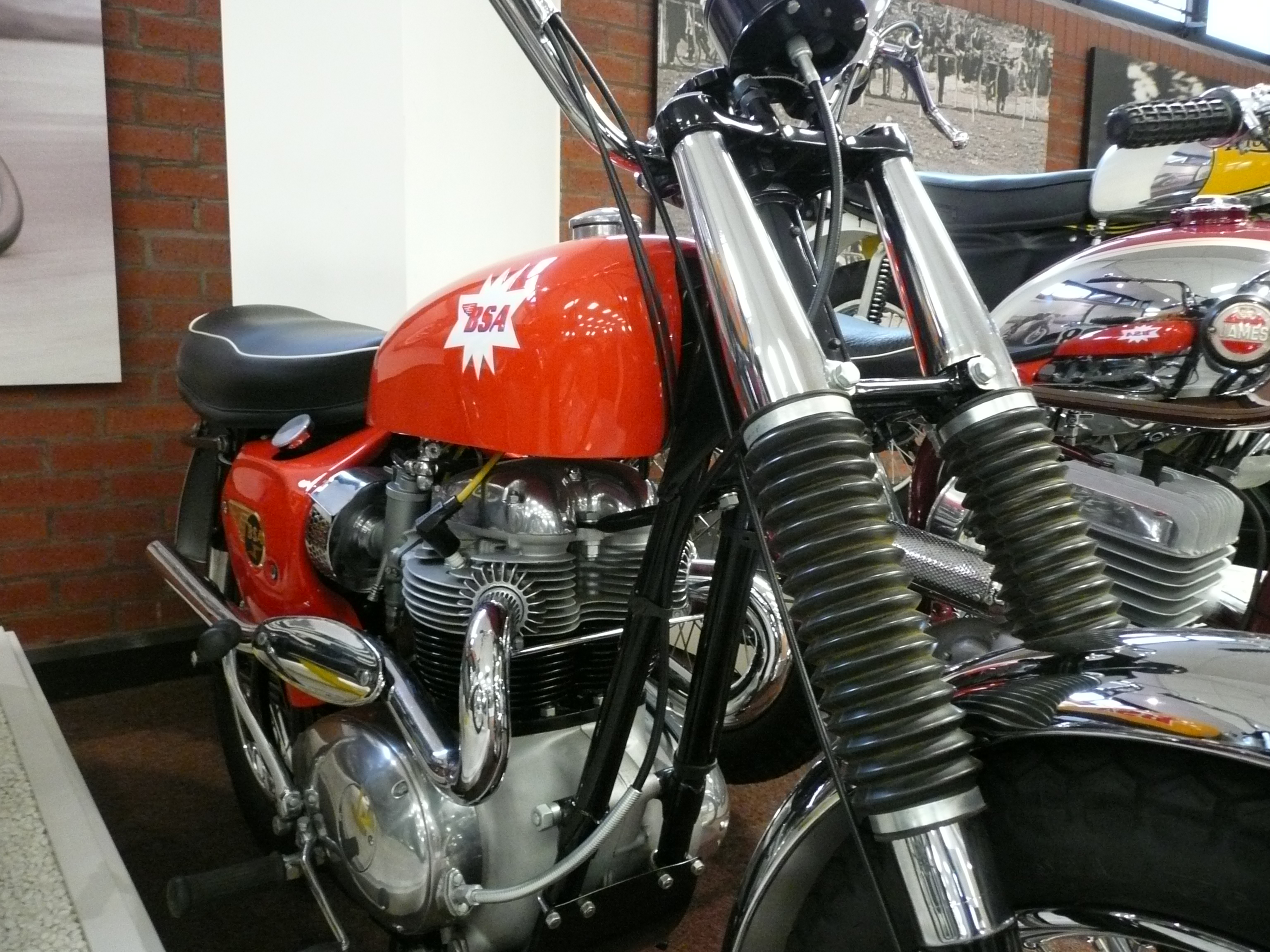
- Manufacturer: BSA, Birmingham
- Also called: A65-25PH; A65H; A65HA
- Production: 1964-67
- Engine: 654 cubic centimetres (39.9 cu in), OHV parallel twin
- Top speed: 102 miles per hour (164 km/h)
- Power: Approximately 53 horsepower
- Transmission: Four speed gearbox to chain final drive
- Brakes: Drum brakes
- Tires: Dunlop K70 Gold Seal
- Wheelbase: 56 inches (140 cm)
- Seat height: 32.5 inches (83 cm)
- Weight: 380 pounds (170 kg) (dry)
- Fuel capacity: 2 gallons

The BSA Hornet is a British motorcycle made by BSA at their factory in Birmingham for export to the US between 1964 and 1965.

== Development ==
The BSA Spitfire Hornet ('64-'65) and Hornet ('66-'67) (and the 500cc BSA Wasp) were developed by BSA in 1964 as purpose built off-road and desert racer motorcycles in response to demand from the US market for a 'stripped down' BSA Lightning with more power. Although they could be used on public roads, BSA Spitfire Hornets and Hornets were supplied without headlights or taillights, with 'straight through' exhaust pipes; high pipes (east coast model) and low TT pipes (west coast model) and twin carburettors. The 6 volt coil 'ET' (energy transfer) ignition system was designed to include easy conversion to add lights for road use but the exhaust pipes needed to be fitted with mufflers to become road legal. The 'Mandarin Red' Spitfire Hornet ('64-'65) was further upgraded in 1965 with a more positive gear selector and a quick change gearbox sprocket. Ignition was also improved, as was the lubrication system but customers complained of vibration. In '66 the name was changed to Hornet but still retained the Mandarin Red (looked like orange) color. In '67 the color was changed to a darker red 'Cherokee Red' and was the last production year for the Hornet.

== Spitfire Hornet ==
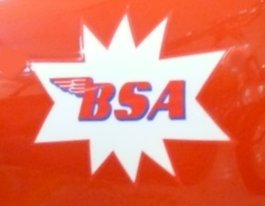

The BSA Spitfire Hornet was a true racing motorcycle, with the A65 engine upgraded with high compression pistons and a performance cam. The gear ratios were altered for sprint acceleration and the brakes (the 8 inch model from the BSA Gold Star) were improved with special cooling fins. The BSA Spitfire Hornet was popular in the US, but was not marketed in the UK. (The name 'Spitfire' was later used for the top-selling BSA Spitfire road bike). For 1966 and 1967 the Spitfire Hornet's name was changed to Hornet.

== Steve McQueen BSA Hornet road test ==
Actor Steve McQueen tested the BSA Hornet and described it as "a keen bike - but I found it awfully heavy". McQueen suggested that a lot more weight would have to be stripped off to make the bike competitive. He also noted that the Hornet also had a tendency to want to go its own way but had what he called a 'good-functioning' power train. He also suggested that if the front forks were raked on a more forward angle the BSA would have "a more stable ride in the rough and would be generally a smoother performer".

== See also ==
- Birmingham Small Arms Company
