= BSA C11 =

British motorcycle

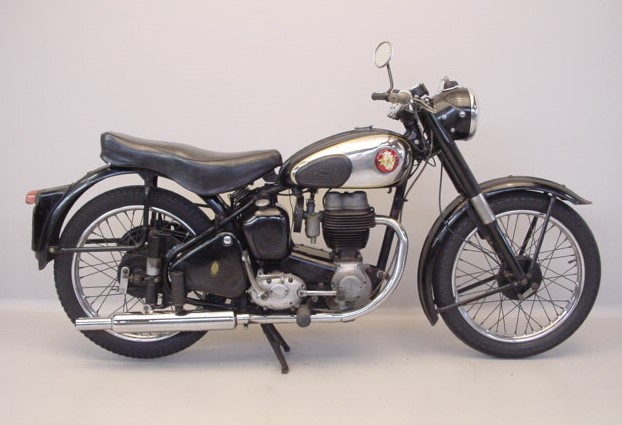
- Manufacturer: BSA
- Production: 1939-1956
- Predecessor: BSA C10
- Successor: BSA C12
- Engine: 249cc OHV single-cylinder engine
- Power: 12 bhp
- Transmission: Duplex primary chain

The BSA C11 is a British motorcycle manufactured by Birmingham Small Arms Company (BSA) at their factory in Armoury Road, Small Heath, Birmingham, between 1939 and 1956. Actor Steve McQueen owned a 1951 BSA C11.

== Development ==
The BSA C11 was a pre-unit single-cylinder developed before the Second World War from the sidevalve C10. Fitted with overhead valves and displacing 249cc, the C11 was launched in 1939 and continued to be developed into the 1950s. The C11 frame was improved in 1951 when BSA added plunger rear suspension.

== Military W-C11 ==
Although British armed forces only used a few BSA C11s as lightweight transport (having selected instead the BSA M20) in 1940 530 C11s were ordered in military specification by the Office of the High Commission of India. Modifications for war use included a rear carrier over the mudguard, an additional air filter on the fuel tank and a mag dyno in place of the coil.

== BSA C11G ==
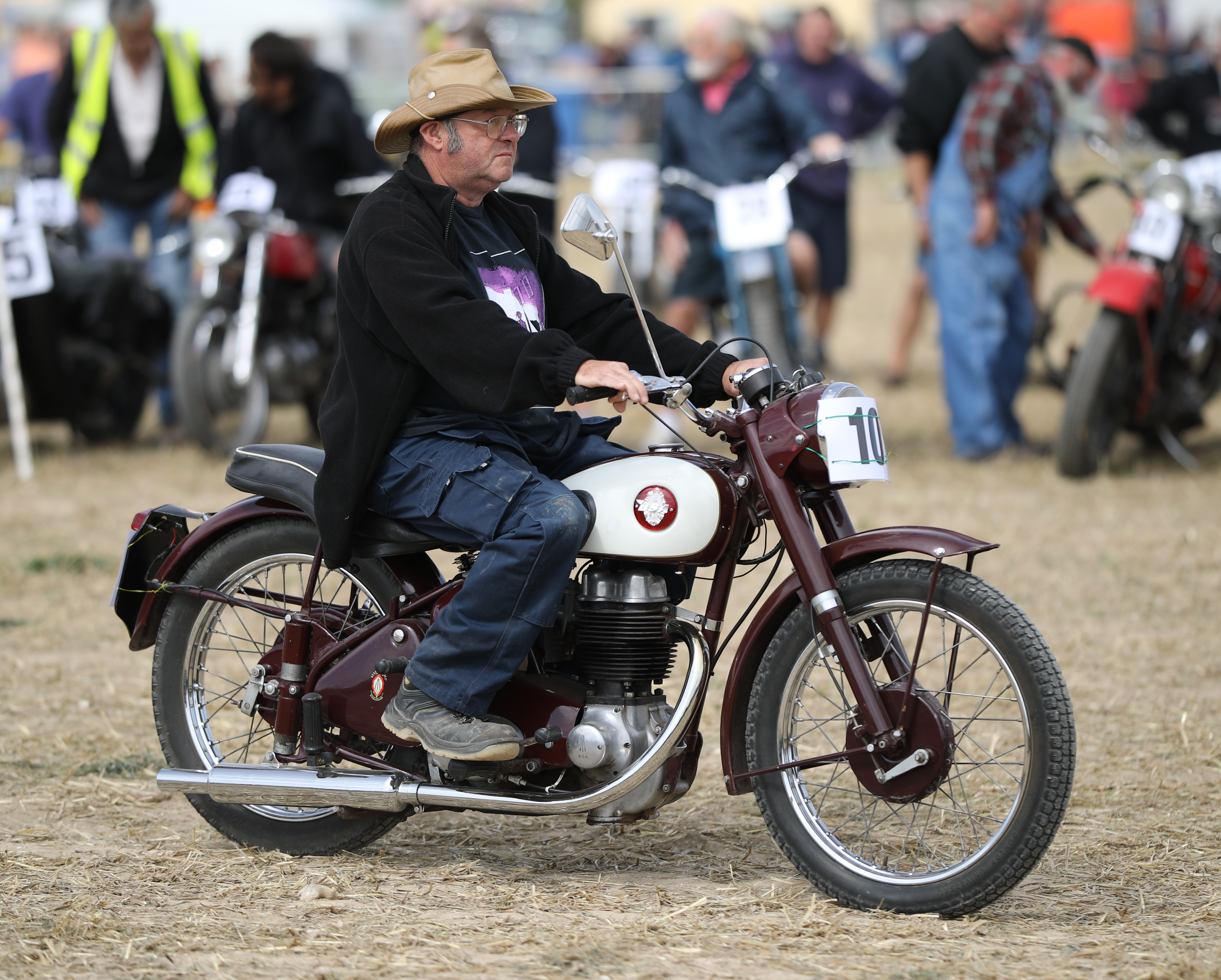
A 1955 BSA C11G

Problems with the gearboxes were addressed by the model C11G, which was available either with a three speed gearbox and a rigid frame or with a four speed gearbox in the plunger frame. The C11G also had improved front brakes and became popular as a post war commuter motorcycle.

== Steve McQueen's C11 ==
Actor Steve McQueen owned a 1951 BSA C11. Painted in British racing green, McQueen's C11 had a chrome tank with green and gold accents and chrome wheels with green spokes. After McQueen's death the C11 was kept by his wife Barbara for many years before being sold by auction.

== BSA C12 ==
From 1956 the C11 was replaced with the BSA C12 which had the same 249cc overhead valve engine in a modern frame with good suspension, more efficient brakes and a more comfortable seat. A number of engine modifications also made it more reliable than the C11. The BSA C12 was in turn replaced by the BSA C15 in 1958.
