= BSA Thunderbolt =

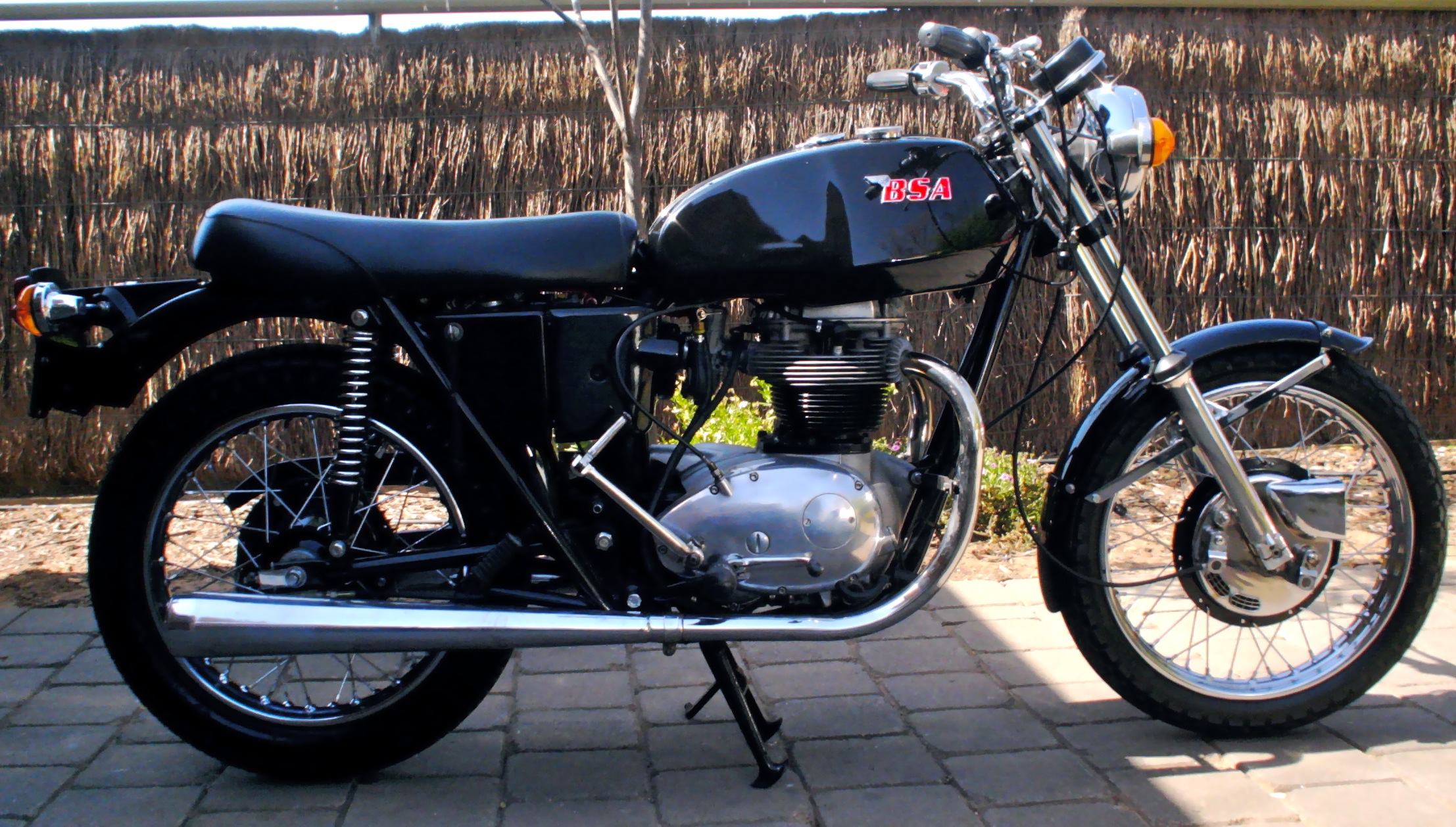
- Manufacturer: BSA, Birmingham, England
- Also called: A65
- Production: 1962-1972
- Engine: 654 cc (39.9 cubic inches) OHV parallel twin
- Top speed: 104 mph (167 km/h)
- Power: 46 bhp (34 kW) @ 7,000 rpm
- Transmission: Four speed gearbox to chain final drive
- Brakes: drum brakes
- Wheelbase: 56 inches (1,400 mm)
- Seat height: 32.3 inches (820 mm)
- Weight: 385 pounds (175 kg) (dry)

The BSA Thunderbolt was a British motorcycle made by BSA at their factory in Armoury Road in Small Heath, Birmingham between 1962 and 1972. Fitted with a single carburettor it was capable of over 100 mph (160 km/h).

== Development ==
The BSA Thunderbolt was designed as a touring motorcycle. A traditional air cooled 650 cc twin cylinder with a single large bore Amal Monobloc carburettor, it did not suffer from the same level of vibration as earlier BSA twins and could comfortably cruise at 70 mph (110 km/h). and reached over 100 mph (160 km/h). in road tests.

The BSA development team decided to keep costs down by re-using the well proven single sided front brake from the BSA Gold Star and the same full race camshaft as the BSA Lightning. Fitted with 12 volt electrics, a Zener diode voltage regulator and twin coil ignition, the Thunderbolt sold well in the important US import market and with the 3.5-imperial-gallon (16 L; 4.2 US gal) fuel tank gave a range of 210 miles (340 km).

From 1968 the Thunderbolt benefited from a number of minor improvements including a longer kick start to make starting easier and metal tank badges to replace the earlier plastic ones, which had a tendency to crack. An Amal Concentric carburettor dealt with the problems of fuel flooding experienced with the earlier monobloc carburettor, by having the float bowl arranged centrally around (concentric with, hence the name) the main jet to remove the sensitivity to fuel surge inherent in all the earlier designs. Stiffer suspension improved cornering but poor quality control and production problems on the BSA assembly line with later models led to oil leaks and rusting parts which damaged the reputation of the Thunderbolt, which was already struggling to compete against the emerging Japanese motorcycles of the early 1970s (such as the Honda CB750) and production ended in 1972.

== T65 Thunderbolt ==
In order to fulfil existing export orders after production of the BSA twins had stopped, between 200 and 300 Triumph TR6 Trophys were rebadged as BSA T65 Thunderbolt and exported to Spain and Australia.

== See also ==
- Birmingham Small Arms Company
