= BSA Spitfire =

BSA A65 Spitfire
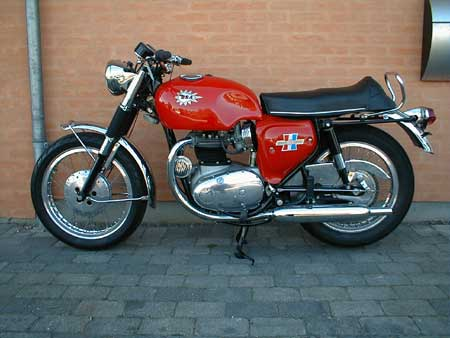
- BSA Spitfire MkIV
- Manufacturer: BSA Motorcycles Ltd
- Parent company: Birmingham Small Arms Company
- Production: 1966–1968
- Predecessor: A65L Lightning
- Engine: 654 cc (39.9 cu in) air cooled four stroke, parallel twin, OHV, 2 valves per cylinder, 2 Amal 10GP2 carburettors, five pints of oil
- Power: 54 bhp (40 kW) (claimed) @ 6900 rpm
- Transmission: 4 Speed, chain
- Suspension: BSA telescopic front fork with two-way damping, Girling rear shock absorbers with three-position spring adjustment
- Brakes: 190mm (7.5 inches) front, 180mm (7 inches) rear
- Wheelbase: 56 inches
- Seat height: 33 inches
- Fuel capacity: 4 gallons (2 in the US export version)

The BSA Spitfire is a high-performance BSA motorcycle made from 1966 to 1968 with model designations of MkII, MkIII and MkIV. Announced at the Brighton motorcycle show held during September 1965, it was based on the earlier BSA Lightning with a power-upgrade achieved by higher compression-ratio 10.5:1 pistons and two large-bore Amal GP carburettors with velocity stacks it was one of the first BSAs to have 12-volt electrics. At introduction in 1966, it was the fastest standard BSA ever produced and the fastest standard motorcycle tested by Motor Cycle with a best run at 123 mph and average of 119.2 mph The Spitfire was used for travelling Marshalls' course duties at the 1967 Isle of Man TT races.

== Development ==
=== Spitfire Mark II ===
The first A65S Spitfire of 1966 was designated Mark II (MKI Spitfires were made for the 1957 year and were off road motorcycles based on the A10 platform) and had a number of new features including two-way damped front forks, Girling shocks and a brace between the downswept exhaust pipes. A 190mm front drum brake improved braking and lightweight alloy rims reduced the weight to 174 kg.

The bike was supplied as a sports-tourer with raised handlebar, forward-mounted rider footrests, a large dual seat with race-styled hump, and the glass-fibre fuel tank and side panels covering the oil tank/tool compartment and battery were finished in Peony Red. The UK Spitfire had a conventional four gallon tank, with a large five gallon option from 1967.

A selection of factory extras were available to enable the model to enter Production Races, including a fairing and single racing seat.

Two large-bore Amal GP carburetors with velocity stacks improved acceleration but made the Spitfire hard to kick start when the engine was hot, so owners chose to replace them with Amal Concentric carburetors with more conventional round air filters and this became the factory supplied specification in 1967. Keen to boost sales in the US market BSA produced a Spitfire with a two-gallon fuel tank following the trend set by the Harley Davidson Sportster.

=== Spitfire Mark III ===
For the 1967 Model Year (MY) the Spitfire was upgraded and designated as Mark III. The racing Amal GP carburettors with open-intakes (bellmouths) were replaced by Amal Concentrics with individual chrome filters which enabled better low-range engine response.

The fuel tank was enlarged to five UK gallons, which hampered both spark plug and carburetor accessibility. Both Mark II and Mark III UK models carried the traditional BSA 'flash' side-panel badges inset in the side cover gelcoat. The export Mark III, a majority of the Spitfires, had a transfer on the side covers similar (but not the same) as the other '67 model year machines.

Other modifications were Amal alloy (aluminum) control levers with click-stop cable adjusters, production of which BSA took over from Amal, marketed under their 'Motoplas' accessories branding, and the Zener diode voltage regulator was installed in an aluminium heat-sink mounted high on the front frame tubes to benefit from the cooling airstream.

=== Spitfire Mark IV ===
The 1968 Mark IV Spitfire was the last year of the 'Mark' Spitfires made. Amal's Concentric carburetors were combined with twin-leading-shoe front brakes and independently adjustable Lucas ignition points for easier starting and tuning. Engine power output was increased to 53 bhp (40 kW). A total of 1291 true 1968 model year Spitfires were produced, not counting the 478 'hybrid' 1968 Spitfires that have 1967 style numbers. The 'hybrids' were dispatched in March to May 1968 near the end of the 1968 model year.

== Gallery ==
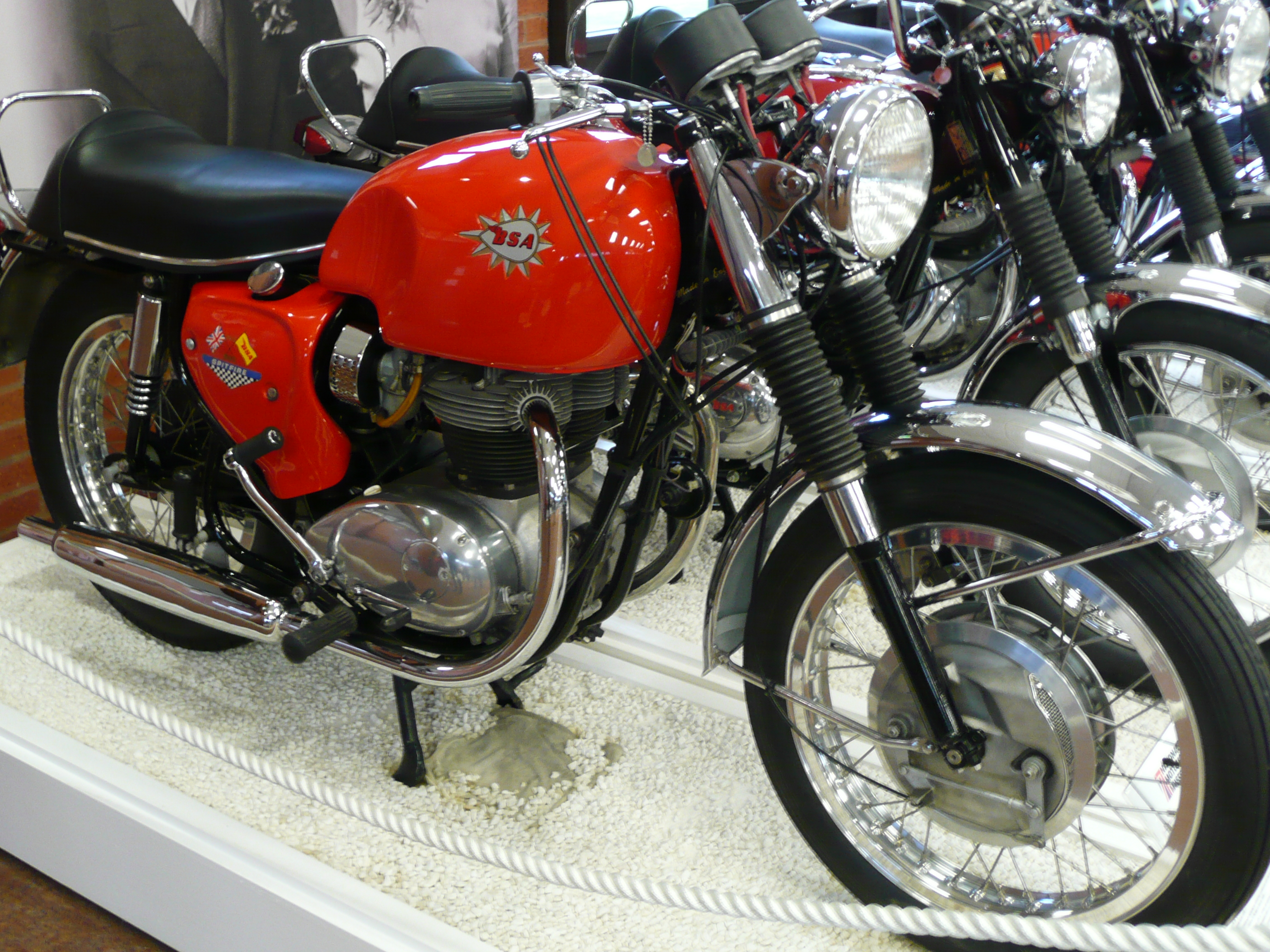
Spitfire MK IV at Birmingham National Motorcycle Museum

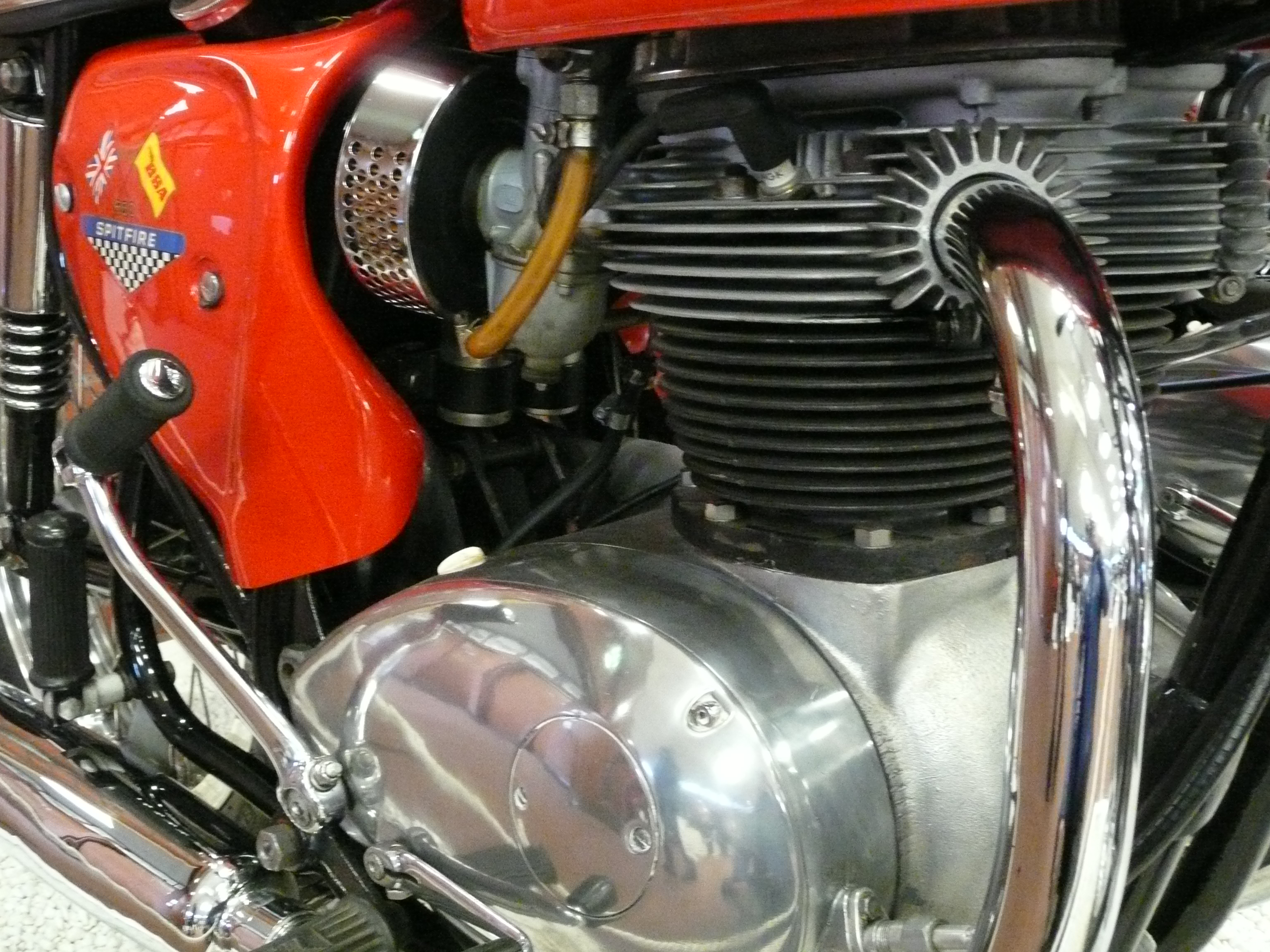
Spitfire MK IV at Birmingham National Motorcycle Museum

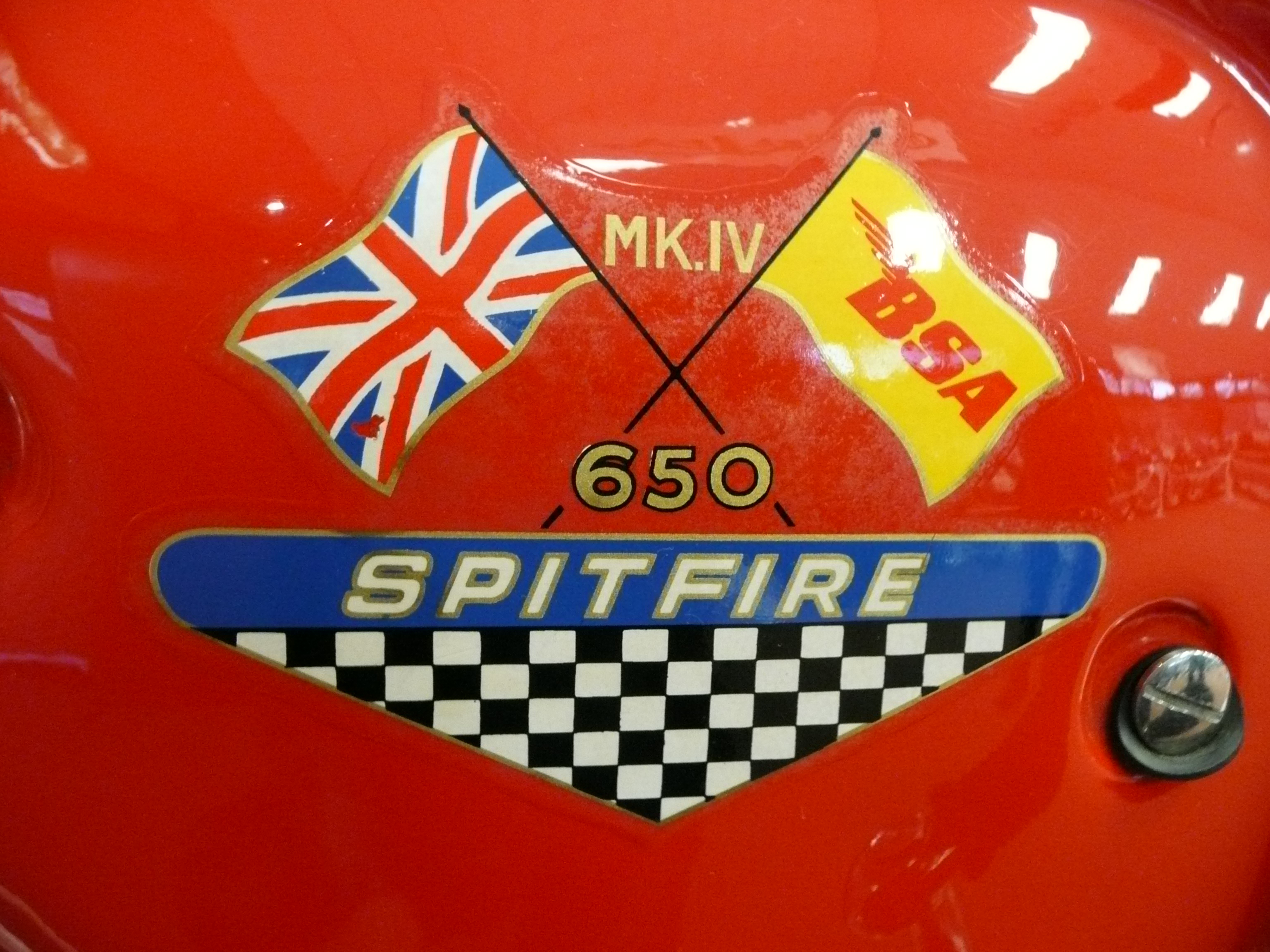
Close up of MK IV badge

== See also ==
- BSA Lightning Rocket
- BSA Lightning
- BSA A65 Rocket
- BSA Hornet
