= BSA Lightning =

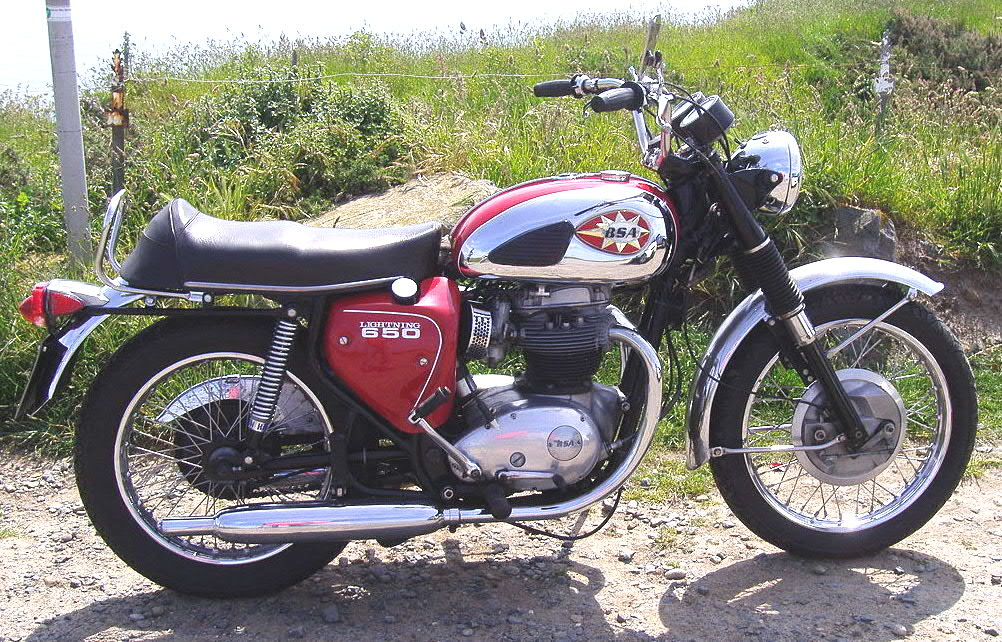
- Manufacturer: BSA Motorcycles Ltd, Armoury Road, Small Heath, Birmingham
- Also called: A65L
- Parent company: Birmingham Small Arms Company
- Production: 1965–1972
- Engine: 654 cc (39.9 cu in) OHV parallel twin
- Top speed: 112 mph (180 km/h)
- Power: 52 bhp (39 kW) @ 7,000 rpm (claimed)
- Transmission: Four-speed gearbox to chain final drive
- Brakes: Drum; Front: 8.0 in (200 mm); Rear: 7.0 in (180 mm)
- Wheelbase: 56 in (1,400 mm)
- Seat height: 32.3 in (820 mm)
- Weight: 395 lb (179 kg) (dry)
- Fuel capacity: 4 imp gal (18 L; 4.8 US gal)
- Oil capacity: 110 imp fl oz (3,100 ml; 110 US fl oz) engine 18 imp fl oz (510 ml; 17 US fl oz) gearbox
- Fuel consumption: 58 mpg_{‑US} (4.1 L/100 km; 70 mpg_{‑imp})

The BSA Lightning is a British BSA 650 cc-class motorcycle made in Birmingham between 1965 and 1972.

== Development ==
The BSA Lightning was designed as the all-round sports machine of the 1960s, planned largely for export to the US market to complement the touring Thunderbolt and the later development, the supersports Spitfire. Development of the engine aimed to make it more reliable, quieter and less prone to oil leaks, with top speed sacrificed to improve mid-range and rideability. Nevertheless, with twin carburettors the A65L could still reach 108 mph (174 km/h). Improvements included an oil pressure warning light, but this had a tendency to malfunction, so riders learned to ignore it.

In 1964 the Rocket (A65R) model came standard with the Spitfire camshaft then later for 1965 all 650's came with the Spitfire grind high lift camshaft that made for lively acceleration and performance at higher rpm than the earlier A65. Some models came with a close ratio gearbox. The bottom gear was a bit high, however, so riders had to learn to slip the clutch up to 10 mph (16 km/h). Above 5000 rpm customers also complained about excessive vibration, with a tendency to weave above 90 mph (140 km/h).

A useful feature was an 'emergency starting' key position for times when the battery was flat to connect the alternator current directly to the ignition coils.

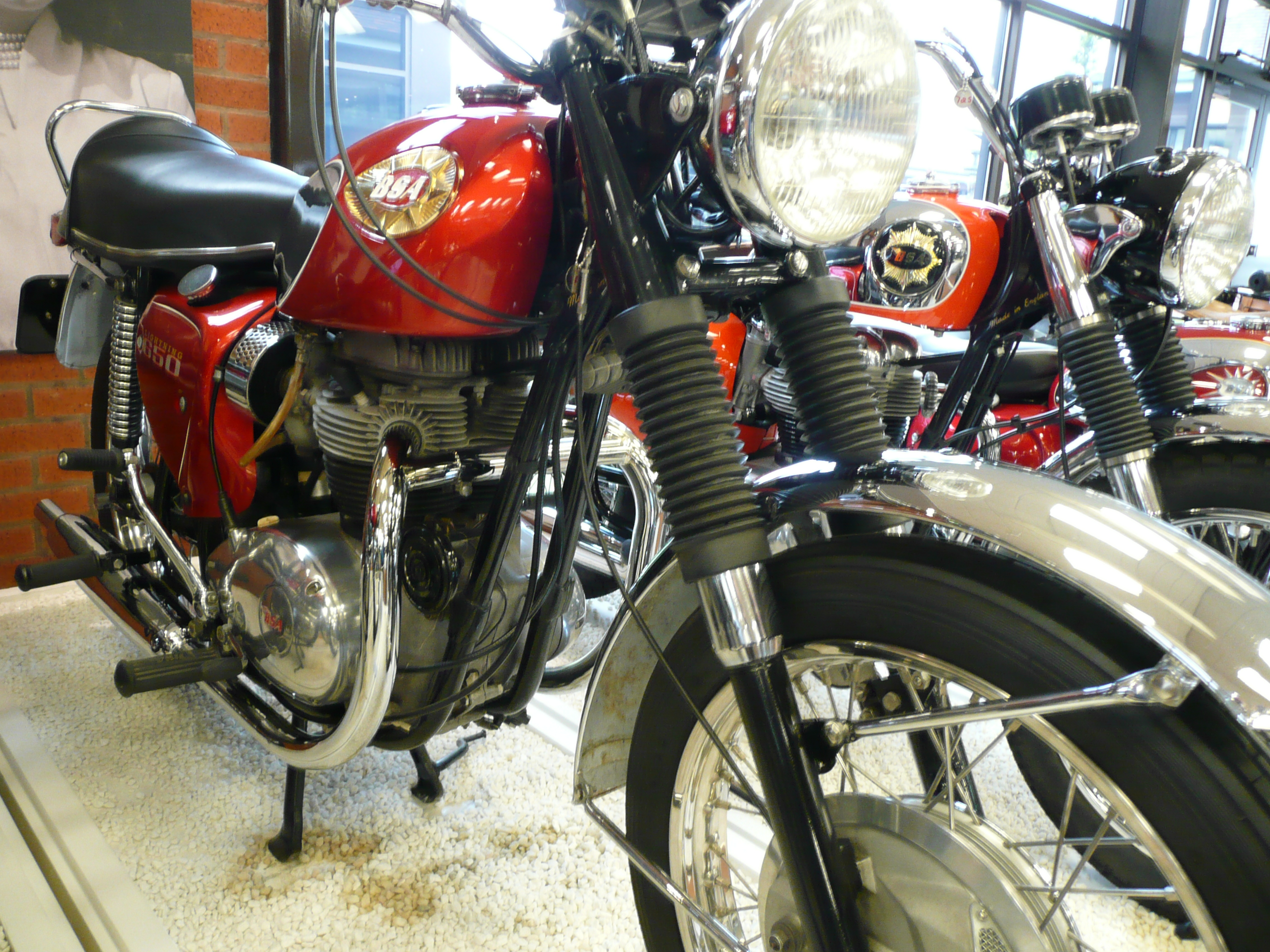
Lightning showing exhaust balance pipe

From 1969 the Lightning was changed with balanced exhaust pipes, redesigned silencer-internals, widened crankcase-half mating faces and a twin leading shoe front brake. When road testing, Motorcycle Sport found the natural cruising speed to be 70 mph (110 km/h), but was impossible to ride comfortably at more than 5,500 rpm in the higher gears due to severe vibration, with 6,200 revs repeatedly breaking the headlamp bulb filament; accordingly no top-speed runs were attempted.

In 1971, 201 750cc versions, designated the A70L, were also produced for American racing homologation purposes.

In 1971 the BSA Group were in financial difficulties and, in a last attempt to extend the brand life, a new frame was developed for the A65L. As well as raising the seat height to an impractical 33 in (840 mm), it actually broke during testing at the Motor Industry Research Association (MIRA) test track, marking the end of one of the most successful range of British twin cylinder motorcycles.

== A70 Lightning ==
To produce a 750cc machine for AMA Class C racing, BSA lengthened the stroke of Lightning's crankshaft by 11mm to give a displacement of 751cc. 202 A70 Lightning machines were produced to meet the minimum production requirements. All were exported to the US, most to the East Coast distributor in Baltimore.

== James Bond film Thunderball ==
A fully faired gold-painted BSA Lightning fitted with missiles appeared in the 1965 James Bond film Thunderball, ridden by former road-race champion Bill Ivy as a stunt double, wearing a blonde wig to make him look like Bond girl Fiona Volpe, played by Italian actress Luciana Paluzzi. Volpe used the BSA to fire two rocket missiles and destroy Count Lippe's car, which was chasing Bond.

A working missile launching system was fitted to the motorcycle but the explosion which destroyed the car was actually detonated remotely by stunt coordinator Bob Simmons. The filming of the scene was recorded in a Ford Motor Company film A Child's Guide to Blowing Up a Motor Car that is on the Ultimate DVD edition of Thunderball.

In September 1965, the actual bike was exhibited at a Brighton motorcycle show held at the Metropole Hotel exhibition centre.

== See also ==
- BSA Lightning Clubman
- Birmingham Small Arms Company
