= Amal (carburettor) =

British carburettor manufacturing company

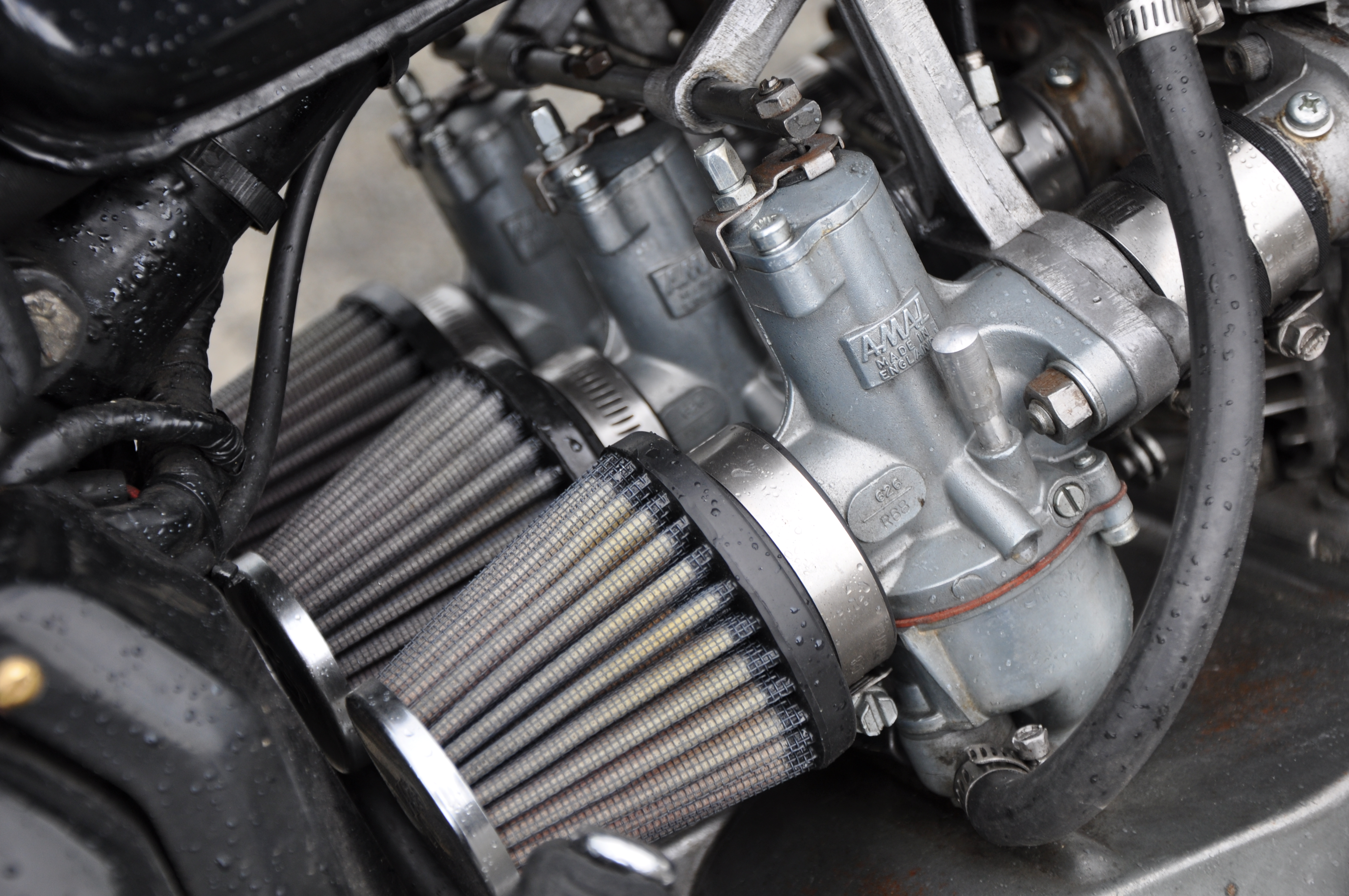
- Triple Amal Concentric carburettors fitted to a Triumph Trident
- Industry: Motor
- Headquarters: Salisbury, Wiltshire previously Birmingham, UK
- Products: Carburettors previously also motorcycle controls
- Website: Burlen Ltd

AMAL was a British engineering company serving the motorcycle and other light-engineering motor industries between 1927 and 1993 based in Birmingham, England.

AMAL is a British carburettor trademark. Amal was the supplier of carburettors to many marques within the British motorcycle industry including the largest of British manufacturers, such as Triumph, BSA and AMC, and to producers of small industrial engines.

The main carburettor types commonly associated with Amal are slide carburettors for motorcycles. These were historically distinguishable as three types: the Standard, with a separate float chamber, the Monobloc with an integral but offset float chamber and the Concentric, a later development with the float chamber directly below the body and air-slide.

Less-common types, known as GP and TT, were mainly for road-racing and other competition use, and were used on high-performance road machines such as BSA Gold Star, BSA Spitfire and Velocette Thruxton.

Amal also produced handlebars and control levers for the motorcycle industry, via a subsidiary business, Lozells Engineering, twist grips, cables and wire, plus ICI silicone grease. All AMAL chromium plated components were stated to be finished in "Nickel Chromium Plating, British Standard Approved."

Amal's light-alloy levers with click-stop adjusters 509/001 brake and 509/002 clutch were taken-over by BSA and marketed under their 'Motoplas' accessories branding from 1967, with Doherty taking-over production of the traditional chromed-steel levers.

With the decline of the British motorcycle industry, the use of Amal carburettors declined, but they are still produced under different ownership as spares for the classic market.

== Company history ==
The AMAL company was formed in the late 1920s when three manufacturers amalgamated – Amac, Brown and Barlow, and Binks – to manufacture carburettors and associated products under the name Amalgamated Carburetters Ltd.

The name changed to Amal Ltd in 1931. Amal subsequently became partly owned by IMI Group, and the product range was expanded to include handlebars and controls with full IMI ownership by the middle 1960s. It was sold after June 1973 to Grosvenor Works Ltd of North London - a supplier of fuel system components. Under Grosvenor some of the most popular obsolete ranges were remanufactured.

In 2003, the business was sold to Burlen Fuel Systems Limited, a company that also produces SU, Solex and Zenith, three other classic carburettor ranges.

Amal carburettors were used on Cooper Formula 3 racing cars and racing motor cycles. Coopers fitted with the J.A.P. 1,100 cc engine with such a carburettor were popular in hill climbs and sprints competitions, and were used by the frequent champion in the 1960s, David Boshier Jones.

== Carburettor products ==
Besides carburettors for light-applications such as types 308 and 355 for Pedal Cycle Motors, Amal historically had three popular carburettor designs: 'Standard' fitted up to 1955, 'Monobloc' fitted from 1955 and 'Concentric' fitted from 1967.

The most historic - 76 & 276 Series (Amal 'Standard' series) can be spigot or flange fixing with adjustment screws on the left or right hand sides of the carburetter body. The available bore sizes are 15/16", 1" and 1 1/16" diameters. The 276 type carburettor is, in virtually all aspects, identical to the 76 version, except that the main emulsion air is drawn from inside the air intake (air filter) whilst the 76 carburettor uses unfiltered air. The 76 types are of die-cast zinc construction and were introduced in the early 1930s, replacing the earlier 6 series, which were of bronze construction, although basically the same design. The 276 type was introduced in 1940 in an attempt to improve the carburettor's durability in dusty and dirty operating environments.

In the same design range were the 4 and 5 types with smaller bore sizes and the 29 type with larger bore sizes. These were replaced with the 74, 75 and 89 and then, later, by the 274, 275 and 289 types.

The 'Monobloc' type was available from 1955 with designations 375, 376 and 389

The more modern "Concentric", developed and introduced for the 1967 Model Year, was initially designated 600 and 900. The 600 series had bore sizes of 22mm, 24mm and 26mm, being known as 622, 624, and 626 respectively. Similarly, the 900 series with bore sizes of 28mm, 30mm and 32mm, were known as 928, 930, and 932 respectively.

The largest bore at 32mm was slightly larger than any previous Monobloc, and all were flange-fitting with stud-holes at two-inch centres.

The Concentric design with non-protruding float chamber was both slimmer and shorter, enabling easier mounting to two-port cylinder heads. Left or right sided carburettors could be produced from basically the same die-casting, and the design was compatible with up to 40 degrees of downdraught.

Eventually three variants were produced: Mk1, Mk1.5 and Mk2.

=== 'Standard' series ===
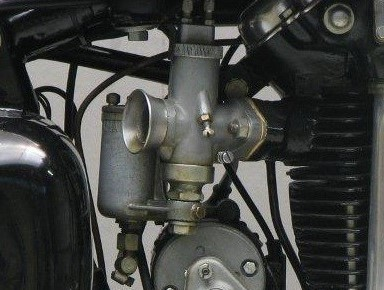
Amal type 276 carburettor fitted to a 1951 BSA B31 350cc

Following the merger of Amac, Brown and Barlow, and Binks to form Amal, a new range of carburettors were introduced in 1929, the 'Standard' range. The body of these carburettors was cast in bronze and the other components made of brass. The float chamber was manufactured as a separate unit and attached to the carburettor by an arm. To mount the carburettor to the engine, the carburettors were available in both flange and spigot options. Four body sizes were available:

- Type 4 - 21/32", 23/32" & 25/32" bore diameters
- Type 5 - 13/16" & 7/8" bore diameters
- Type 6 - 15/16", 1" & 1 1/16" bore diameters
- Type 29 - 1 3/32", 1 1/8" & 1 5/32" bore diameters

The sand cast body was expensive to produce and limited production throughput. To reduce production costs and time, die cast zinc alloy bodies were introduced in 1932. These were designated types 74, 75, 76 and 89 and were virtually identical to the previous types, most of the components were interchangeable.

Ingress of dust and dirt caused premature wear to the carburettor, which was partially resolved by fitting air filters. The idle and air bleed circuits still drew air from outside the body which led to blocked jets and tubes. To overcome this types 274, 275, 276 & 289 were introduced in 1939 which took the air feeds from the incoming filtered airflow.

=== Monobloc ===
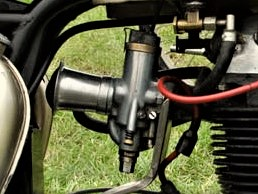
Amal 376 Monobloc carburettor fitted to a 1958 BSA A10 Golden Flash

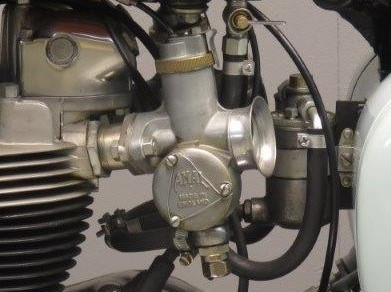
Chopped Amal Monobloc carburettors and remote float chamber fitted to a 1958 Triumph T120 Bonneville 650cc

Introduced in 1954, the Monobloc was introduced to reduce production cost. Whilst the design relied heavily on the previous standard series, the float chamber had been combined into the carburettor casting. The jet block and slide had been simplified and a removable pilot jet introduced instead of the drilling on the Standard models. This allowed a common jet block to be used on different models. Three sizes were introduced:

- Type 375 - 21/32", 23/32", 25/32", 13/16" and 7/8" bore diameters, replacing the 274 and 275 standard types
- Type 376 - 15/16", 1" and 1 1/16" bore diameters, replacing the 276 standard types
- Type 389 - 1 1/8", 1 5/32" and 1 3/16" bore diameters, replacing the 289 standard types

The 375 was also available with a cast in air filter in 25/32" and 13/16" bore diameters. These were designated type 363.

All Monoblocs were initially manufactured with the float chamber projecting on the left side of the body when viewed from the air intake. This led to fitment problems on twin carb installation. Amal introduced a "chopped" version of the 376 and 389 without the float chamber so twin carburettors could be fitted. Both carbs were fed from the float chamber of the left hand carb. Triumph twins used two chopped monoblocs and a remote float chamber mounted centrally behind the carbs. In 1964 a right hand version of the 389 was introduced, designated 689, which was a mirror image of the 389. This allowed twin carb installations with each carb having its own float chamber.

Production ended in 1967 when the Concentric was introduced. The Monobloc was reintroduced in 2014, the 375 body being cast in aluminium alloy. Replacement hard anodised slides to reduce wear were made available.

=== Concentric ===
==== Mark 1 ====
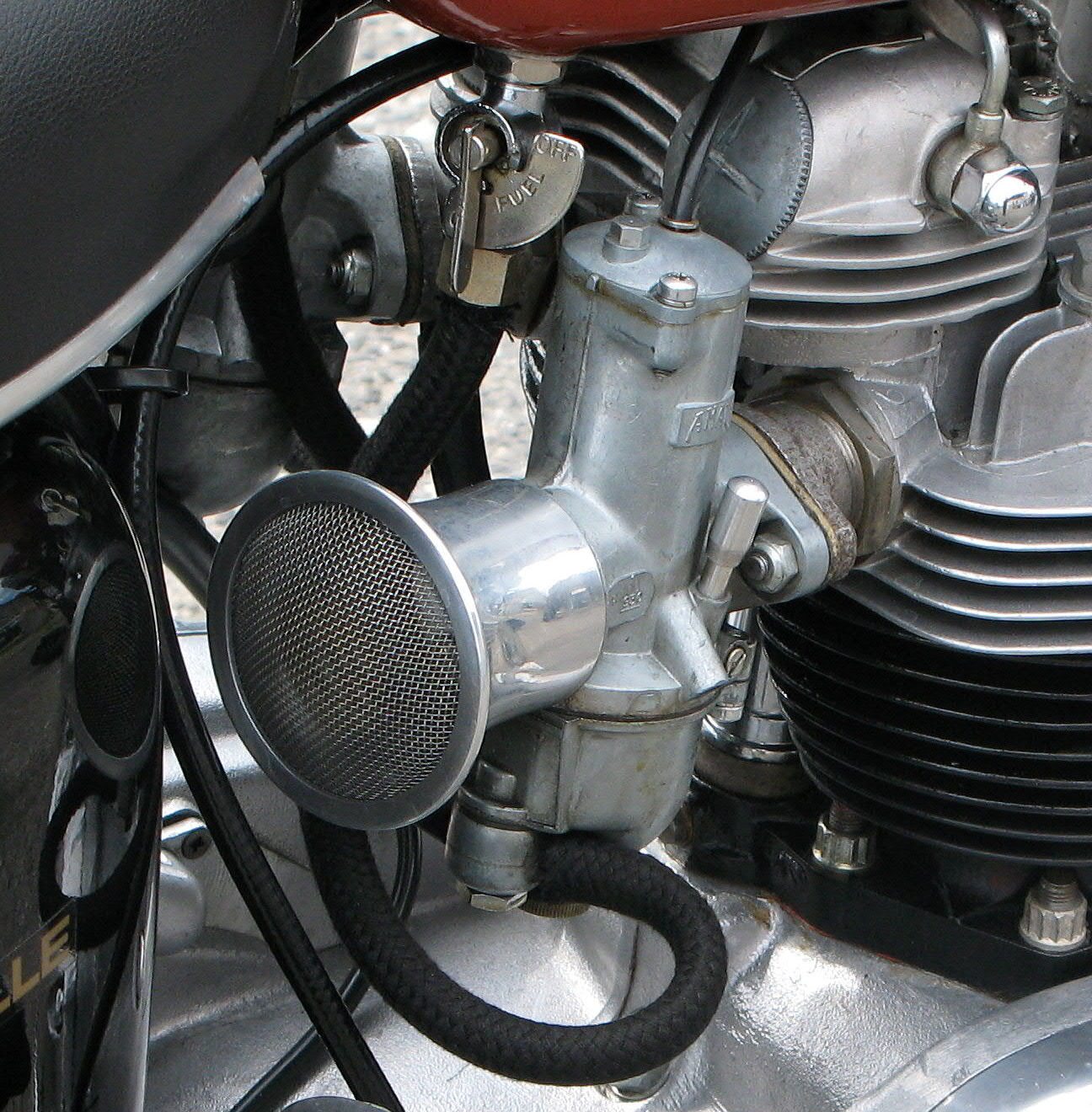
Amal Concentric carburettor, one of two fitted to a Triumph Bonneville, with the second just visible to the rear

To reduce the technical and manufacturing problems of previous carbs and with pending emission controls requiring more accurate fuel metering, a new carburettor, the Concentric, was introduced for the 1968 model year. A hemispherical float chamber was introduced below and concentric with the main jet to eliminate differences in fuel height during cornering. There was no jet block, the jets being mounted directly into the body. The pilot jet reverted to a drilling instead of a removable jet. Right and left hand carburettors were available with flange mountings only.

Three body sizes were initially produced:

- 400 series - 12 - 20 mm bore diameters
- 600 series - 22 - 27 mm bore diameters
- 900 series - 28 - 32 mm bore diameters

To satisfy the demand for larger carburettors the 1000 series was introduced in 1970 with bore sizes of 34, 36 and 38mm.

The British motorcycle industry was in decline and with the lack of orders for OEM carburettors, production was limited after 1975 for replacement and aftermarket sales. Following the introduction of other models of the Concentric, this model became known as the Mark 1.

===== Premier =====
An updated version of the Mark 1, the Premier, was introduced in 2012. The castings for the body and float bowl were in aluminium alloy and the slide was made of hard anodised aluminium. A new float was introduced that was resistant to the ethanol in modern fuels. The pilot jet was removable. and the idle circuit improved.

==== Mark 1.5 ====
To supply demand for OEM carburettors for Spanish made motorcycles, Amal licensed Talleres Arreche to produce carburettors in Spain. Initially this production was of 400, 600 and 900 series Concentrics. The Spanish motorcycle manufacturers required a better cold starting system so Amal and Talleres Arreche jointly designed modifications to the concentric to provide a separate enrichment circuit. These carburettors, introduced in 1973, were available in both flange and spigot mountings to suit the Spanish manufacturers requirements. To distinguish this variant from the British made version, they became known as Mark 1.5 or Mark 1 1/2 and a 1 prefix added to the product number, for example the modified 626 became the 1626.

A derivative of the 400 series is still in production by Talleres Arreche in 16, 18 and 20 mm bores with Amal embossed on the body.

==== Mark 2 ====
Introduced in 1974, the Mark 2 used aluminium alloy for the main castings rather than the zinc alloy previously used. The cold starting system from the Mark 1.5 was integrated into the new design. Whilst the float chamber was still concentric with the main jet, it was now a square section. The pilot jet reverted to being removable and could be inserted in an alternate position for higher downdraught applications. Flange mounting was discontinued and the Mark 2 was only available in spigot mounting.

Three body sizes were available:

- 2600 series - 22, 24, 25, 26 and 27mm bore diameters
- 2900 series - 28, 30, 32 and 34mm bore diameters
- 2000 series - 34, 36 and 38mm bore diameters

=== Racing carburettors ===
==== Type 27 ====
The Type 27 was Amal's first carburettor specifically designed for racing machines, and was based on AMAC's TT carburettor that had been introduced in 1924. A jet block and hollow slide were used. The body, jet block and slide were assembled and then machined as one unit to ensure perfect matching and unobstructed flow through the carburettor. No needle or needle jets were fitted. For starting a pilot jet and bypass were used. To reduce fuel surge when cornering, two float chambers were used with the 27, one mounted on either side of the carb.

==== TT ====
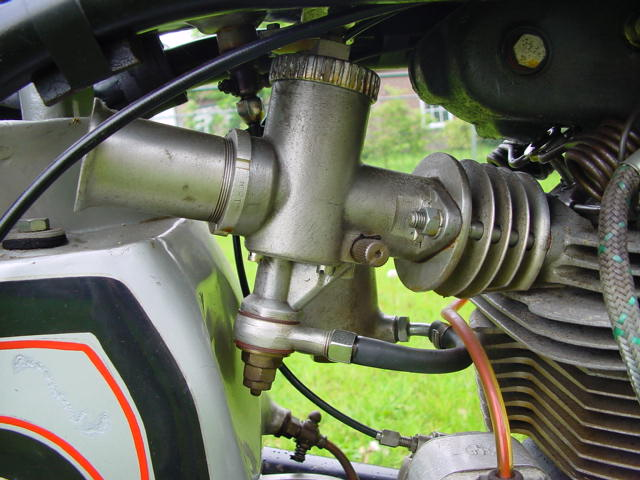
TT carburettor used on a 1955 Manx Norton

The TT (Series 27) was introduced in 1932 as a progression of the Type 27. A needle and needle jet were incorporated to provide additional tuning for road machines and when the carb was used with alcohol as a fuel. Pre-war models were suffixed with the year of manufacture but when production resumed after WW2, all of the TTs had a 9 suffix regardless of year.

As well as the spigot mounting as used by the Type 27, flange fixing was introduced. As the spigot mountings were susceptible to air leaks, flange mounting was seen as an improvement.

Three body sizes were made:

- 25TT - 3/4" and 7/8 bore diameters
- 15TT - 15/16", 1" and 11/16" bore diameters
- 10TT - 1 1/16", 1 3/32", 1 1/8" and 1 5/32" bore diameters

Sales of the 25TT were small and the model was discontinued in 1934. Production of the other two versions continued to 1954.

==== RN ====
The RN (Series 185) was introduced in 1937 as a development of the TT. The needle and jets were moved to the side of the carburettor bore to give a less obstructed flow through the carburettor, although this caused a complicated attachment of the needle to the slide. Although at the time the less restricted flow was seen as an advantage, later opinion was less positive.

Initial the RN was designated as a type of TT, eg 10TT37KN, but soon it was given its own type reference, eg 10RN. It was available in the same sizes as the 10TT and 15TT. This type was less popular than its parent TT. Production ended with the introduction of the GP in 1954.

==== GP ====
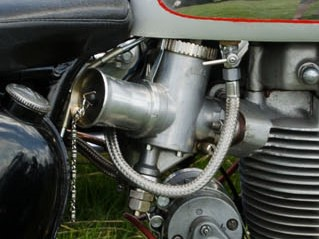
Amal GP carburettor fitted to a 1956 BSA Gold Star 500cc

The GP (Series 316) was introduced in 1954 replacing both the TT and RN, and was a further development of the RN. Although the needle and jets were still offset, they were moved away from the side of the bore which simplified the needle mounting. Air for the pilot feed was taken from the outside of the carb through a drilling. The GP was available in four body sizes and in flange mounting only:

- 15GP - 7/8, 15/16", 1" and 11/16" bore diameters
- 10GP - 1 1/16", 1 3/32", 1 1/8", 1 5/32" and 1 3/8" bore diameters
- 10GP - 1 7/32" and 1 3/8" bore diameters
- 10GP - 1 3/8", 1 13/32", 1 7/16 and 1 1/2" bore diameters

Initially the GP was produced in zinc alloy but in the late 1950s the material was changed to aluminium ally.

The GP suffered from pilot systems, partly due to dust and dirt entering through the air drilling. The pilot system also limited the carb from being used with more than 20° downdraft otherwise flooding of the pilot circuit occurred.

===== GP2 =====
The GP2 series was introduced in 1962 to try to overcome the shortcomings of the GP. The pilot circuit was moved to the inlet side if the slide. The air bleed was taken from the incoming air rather than the outside, reducing the possibility of dirt ingress to the circuit. The moving of the pilot jet allowed far greater downdraught angles without the jet flooding.

The GP2 was available in the same sizes as the original GP.

==== Mark 2 Smoothbore Concentric ====
A smoothbore version of the 2000 series Mark Concentric was made available for racing used. To obtain the "smoothbore", a jet block and hollow slide were fitted. Although the carb was never used as an OEM part, it was popular with smaller specialist racers.
