= Ducati parallel twins =

SOHC motorcycle made by Ducati

Ducati 350/500 GTL
- Manufacturer: Ducati
- Production: 1975–1977
- Class: Standard
- Engine: 497–350 cc (30.3–21.4 cu in) Air-cooled OHC twin cylinder 360° four stroke
- Bore / stroke: 78 mm × 52 mm (3.1 in × 2.0 in) (500); 71.8 mm × 43.2 mm (2.83 in × 1.70 in) (350)
- Compression ratio: 9.6:1
- Top speed: 170 km/h (110 mph) (500); 147 km/h (91 mph) (350)
- Power: 35 bhp (26 kW) @ 6,500 rpm (500)
- Transmission: Multiplate wet clutch, 5 speed
- Frame type: Single cradle
- Suspension: Front: telescopic forks Rear: swinging arm
- Brakes: Disc front (twin on 500); Drum rear
- Tyres: Front: 325x18 Rear: 350x18
- Wheelbase: 1,400 mm (55 in)
- Weight: 170 kg (370 lb) (500); 163 kg (359 lb) (350) (dry)

Ducati 350/500 Sports Desmo Differences from GTL models
- Production: 1977–1981
- Engine: Desmodromic valve operation
- Power: 50 bhp (37 kW) @ 8,500 rpm (500)42 bhp (31 kW) @ 8,500 rpm (350)
- Frame type: Dual cradle
- Brakes: Disc front & rear
- Weight: 185 kg (408 lb) (500); 181 kg (399 lb) (350) (dry)

Ducati 350/500 GTV Differences from GTL models
- Production: 1977-1981
- Top speed: 175 km/h (109 mph) (500); 145 km/h (90 mph) (350)
- Frame type: Dual cradle
- Brakes: Disc front & rear
- Weight: 185 kg (408 lb) (500); 181 kg (399 lb) (350) (dry)

The Ducati parallel twins are a series of 350 cc (21 cu in) and 500 cc (31 cu in) parallel twin SOHC motorcycles produced by the Italian manufacturer Ducati from 1975 to 1981, although 67 Sports Desmos were supplied to Australian importer Frazers in 1983. These were likely built from spares. The 500cc versions were also produced under licence in Spain by MotoTrans, where production continued until 1983. Sales were poor and the machines were unreliable, earning them the nickname of paralysed twins.

== Background ==
In the early 1970s Ducati were in financial trouble and owned by the Italian Government. In 1972 engineer Cristiano de Eccher was appointed General Manager. De Eccher believed the way to turn the company around was to reduce production costs and sell more machines.

Ducati's reputation had been built on the OHC. These were now outdated, only offered moderate performance and were expensive to manufacture. The Japanese were selling a lot of parallel twins and the Ducati management though they could take a share of this market by producing a similar twin.

Following the success of the 750 GT v twin Ducati chief engineer Fabio Taglioni proposed a smaller v twin with belt driven cams rather than bevel drive of the 750 GT to reduce production costs. De Eccher rejected this and in a press conference in 1973 announced that the OHC singles would cease production to be replaced with a new parallel twin.

== Engine ==
Ducati already had a design for a 500 twin. At the request of the American importers, Berliner, Ducati engineer Fabio Taglioni had designed a twin. The prototype had been shown to American dealers at Daytona in early 1965 but because of poor performance was never put into production. The prototype was a 360° ohv twin that used dry sump lubrication. Taglioni declined to develop the engine further and Bruno Tumidei took over the project. Taglioni instead spent his time developing a belt drive OHC v twin, which would later become the Pantah.

Tumidei extensively updated the engine with ease of manufacture as a primary consideration. The vertically split crankcases and 10° forward canted cylinders were retained. Departing from usual Ducati practices, a forged crankshaft was used running in plain main bearings and big end. No centre main bearing was fitted. The engine was fitted with a 180° crankshaft to reduce vibration at high speed, although this increased vibration at low and medium speeds. As the engine was originally designed for a 360° crank with large counterweights, the cranckcases were bulky.

Converting the engine to OHC, and to keep the engine width to a minimum, the camshaft was driven by chain from the back of the clutch hub via a countershaft behind the cylinders. The cylinder head was redesigned to use a more modern 60° valve angle as used on the Imola racing bikes.

To obviate the need for an external oil tank, a remote reservoir was incorporated within the engine. This resulted in complicated internal plumbing, frequent oil changes and the need for the owner to keep a close eye on oil levels.

The five speed gearbox was fitted with a left-hand change to comply with American legislation and an electric starter was fitted. Carburation was by Dell'Orto, 30 mm (1.2 in) on the 500 and 26 mm (1.0 in) on the 350.

The engine suffered reliability problems, especially oil feed to the camshaft. Poor build quality also caused reliability problems.

== Models ==
=== GTL ===
A single downtube frame was used the engine as a stressed member. Marzocchi front forks were fitted. Rear suspension was swinging arm with twin 320 mm Marzocchi shock absorbers. Ignition was by traditional battery and coil and points. British Smiths instruments were fitted.

The machine were styled by Giorgetto Giugiaro, using the same angular styling he used on the 860GT.

The 500 was fitted with twin 260 mm (10 in) disc brakes and a single disc was fitted on the 350. Rear brake was the same 260 mm (10 in) drum that had been fitted on the singles.

Apart from minor changes, such as headlight brackets, the model remained unchanged through its production run.

=== Sports Desmo ===
With sales of the 860GT and twins poor, Franco Zaiubouri replaced De Eccher as Ducati's General Manager in September 1975 and set about reviving the brand. To make the twins more attractive to buyers, a new model, the 500 Sports Desmo, was planned. Taglioni designed a desmodromic head for the twin. This raised power output to 50 bhp (37 kW) @ 8,500 rpm but gave the machine a narrow powerband. A number of other small engine changes were made.

Leopoldo Tartarini of Italjet was engaged to style the new model. The bike was given a twin downtube frame, a 14 L (3.1 imp gal; 3.7 US gal) fibreglass racing tank and matching seat. FPS cast wheels and a rear disc brake were also added. The machine was finished in red and white with a Black exhaust system.

The 500 Sports Desmo went into production in 1976 and a 350 version, finished in black and yellow, introduced the following year. The 350 produced 42 bhp (31 kW) @ 8,500 rpm. The majority of the Sports Desmos were built at the Italjet factory, with engines supplied by Ducati.

=== GTV ===
Introduced in 1977, the GTV was essentially a Desmo fitted with a GTL engine. Japanese switchgear, a Bosch headlight, touring handlebars, a chrome exhaust were fitted. The machine was First shown at the Milan Show in November 1977.

== Production quantities ==
Production quantities of Italian built machines
| Model | 1975 | 1976 | 1977 | 1978 | 1979 | 1980 | 1981 | Total |
|---|---|---|---|---|---|---|---|---|
| 500 GTL | 447 | 285 | 373 | - | - | - | - | 1,105 |
| 350 GTL | 530 | 400 | - | - | - | - | - | 930 |
| 500 Sport Desmo | - | 441 | 1,184 | ? | 130 | ? | 172 | ? (Note: 67 500 Sports Desmos were supplied to Australian importer Frazers in 1983. These were likely built from spares.) |
| 350 Sport Desmo | - | - | 456 | ? | ? (Note: A combined total of 300 350 Sports Desmo and 350 GTV models were made in 1979) | ? | ? | 1,166 |
| 500 GTV | - | - | 453 | ? | ? | ? | ? (Note: A combined total of 294 350 Sports Desmo and 500 Sports Desmo models were made in 1981) | 700 |
| 350 GTV | - | - | 360 | ? | ? | ? | ? | 958 |
| Total | 977 | 1,126 | 2,826 | 1,610 | ? | ? | ? | |

=== Exports ===
A few 500 GTL models were exported to the US.

Around 50 Sports Desmos were exported to the UK, and slightly more than this to France.

208 500 GTLs, 224 Sport Desmos and 36 GTVs were exported to Australia.
