= Zanella =

Argentine motorcycle manufacturing company

Zanella Hnos.

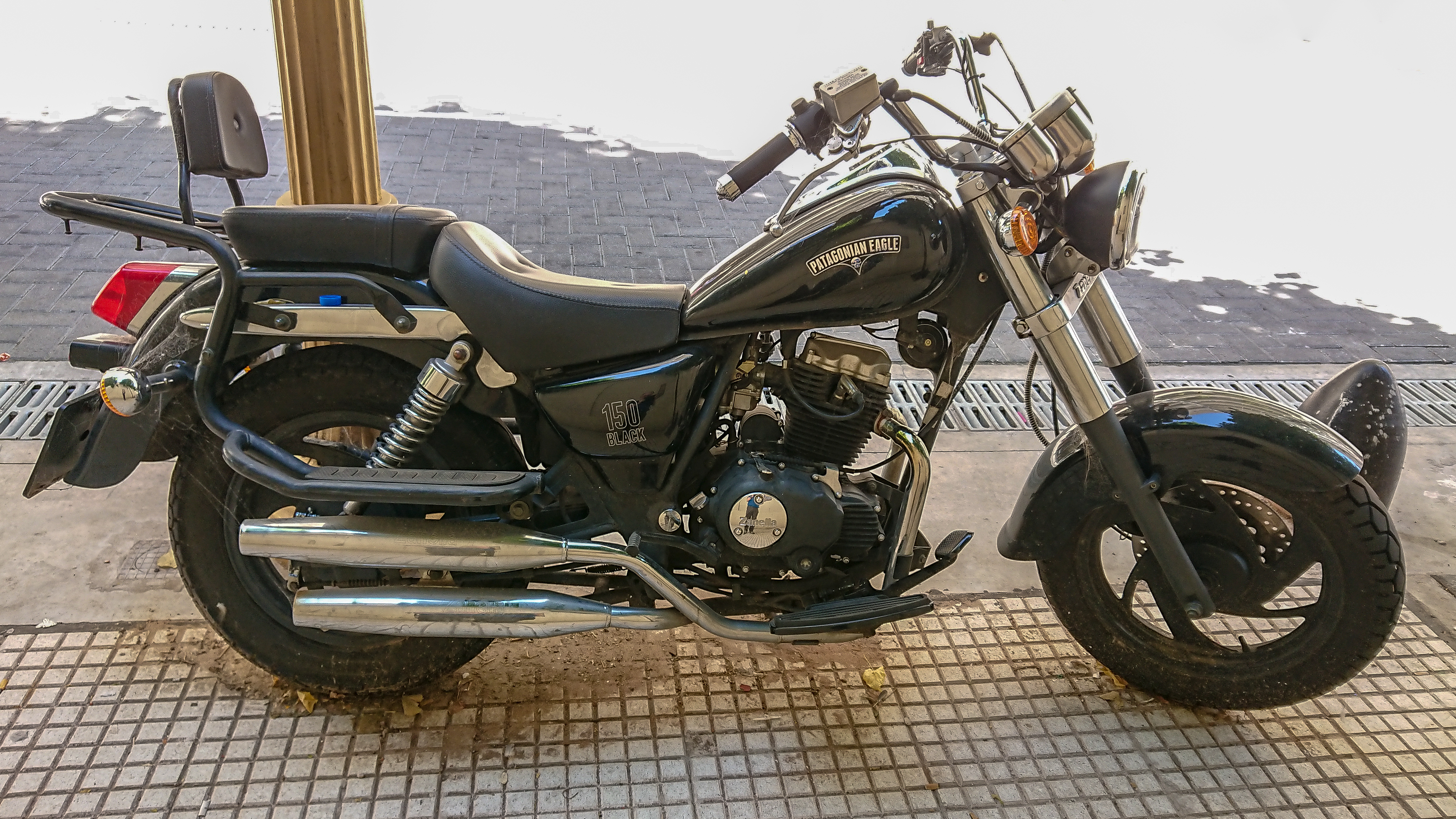
- Moto Zanella Patagonian Blackstreet 150 Custom motorcycle
- Company type: Private
- Founded: 1948
- Founder: Juan and Santiago Zanella
- Headquarters: Buenos Aires, Argentina
- Area served: Argentina
- Key people: Walter Steiner (CEO)
- Products: Motorcycles, mini trucks
- Divisions: Zanella Trucks
- Website: zanella.com.ar

Zanella Hnos., or simply Zanella, is an Argentine motorcycle and mini truck manufacturer founded in 1948, originally using 100 and 125 cc engines designed by Fabio Taglioni and licensed from Ceccato motorcycles of Italy. Zanella builds small motorcycles, mopeds and ATVs. Zanella formerly manufactured go-karts.

Zanella also produces the ZMax series of three-wheel motorcycles (trikes) and mini trucks and the Force series of four-wheel light trucks.

== Business ==
Zanella makes mopeds, scooters, motorcycles, quad ATVs, karts, and 4-stroke engines ranging from 50 to 500 cc. However, only the mopeds are manufactured in Argentina at plants in Caseros and San Luis. Almost all other products are imported from China, usually as knock down kits.

Based on their onsite manufacturing capabilities and their assembly of imported motorcycles, Zanella plants have a monthly installed production capacity of 12,000 units. This current business plan is expected to lead to a production level of 14,000 units per month, returning to previous employment levels with approximately 1,000 direct and 3,000 indirect employees.

On December 22, 2009, an official presentation was held at the Zanella plant in Caseros, Buenos Aires by the Chamber of Manufacturers, Dealers and Suppliers of Motor Vehicles (Cámara de Fabricantes, Concesionarios y Proveedores de Motovehículos - CAFACOM). At the ceremony, General Confederation Entrepreneur of Argentina (CGERA) chairman Marcelo Fernández stated:

"As a national company, Zanella is constantly developing projects in defense of the motorcycle industry and the interests of customers, and that is why we are promoting the creation of the House of Moto, to get more and better benefits for both manufacturers and traders."

== Models ==
=== Utilities ===
Zmax series are three wheelers

- TRICARGO 100 4T
- Z MAX 200
- ZMAX 200 Z2
- Z-MAX 200 S TRUCK
- Z-MAX 200 S TRUCK BOX
- Z-MAX 200 TRUCK Z2

=== CUBS ===
ZB110 Series

- ZB 110 Z1
- ZB 110 Z1 FULL

=== FUN ===
- HOT 90 G2

=== Street ===
- SAPUCAI 125 C
- RX 125 potenciado
- SAPUCAI 150
- RX 150 G3
- RX 150 G3 GHOST
- RX 150 G3 GHOST FULL
- RX 150 Z6 GHOST
- RX 150 Z3 SPORT
- RX 150 R FULL
- RX 200
- RX 1 150
- RX 150 Z5
- RX 1 200
- RX 200 MONACO
- RX 200 NAKED
- RX 200 R
- RX 200 R FULL
- RZ 20
- RX 250 SPORT
- RX 350
- RZ 25 NAKED
- RZ 25 R
- RZ 35 R

=== ON/OFF ===
- ZR 150
- ZT 150
- ZR 200
- ZR 250 LT
- ZR 250
- ZTT 250 MOTARD

=== Scooters ===
- STYLER 150 R16
- STYLER 50 EXCLUSIVE
- STYLER 125 EXCLUSIVE G2
- STYLER 150 EXCLUSIVE
- STYLER 150 CRUISER
- MOD 150
- MOD LAMBRETTA 150
- E-STYLER
- E-STYLER DELUXE
- STYLER 250 CRUISER
- STYLER 250 GRANDCRUISER

=== CUSTOM ===
- PATAGONIAN EAGLE BLACKSTREET 150
- PATAGONIAN EAGLE BLACKMETAL 150
- PATAGONIAN EAGLE 150
- PATAGONIAN EAGLE 250
- SPEEDLIGHT 150
- SPEEDLIGHT 200
- PATAGONIAN EAGLE 250 II SHADOW
- PATAGONIAN EAGLE 250 DARKROAD
- PATAGONIAN EAGLE 350 CHOPPER

=== QUADS ===
- ZANELLA KIDS 50 SPORT
- FX KART 50
- FX KART 125
- FX KART 150
- FX 90 CARGO
- FX 90 SERIES
- FX 90 KIDS SPORT
- FX 150 CARGO
- FX 125 MADMAX
- FX 150 MADMAX
- FX 150 MADMAX AUTO.
- FX 200 MADMAX
- FX 250 MADMAX
- FX 250 MADMAX KING
- FX 300 MAD MAX
- GFORCE 200 4X2
- GFORCE 250 4X2
- GFORCE 250 II 4X2
- GFORCE 500 4X4

== Electrical generators ==
Zanella also produces the following electrical generators:

- G-1000
- G-2500
- G-4500
- G-6000
- G-8500
