= Ducati 239 Mark 3 =

SOHC motorcycle by Ducati

- Manufacturer: Ducati
- Production: 1974
- Class: Standard
- Engine: 238.6 cc (14.56 cu in) Air-cooled bevel drive SOHC single cylinder four stroke
- Bore / stroke: 72.5 mm × 57.8 mm (2.85 in × 2.28 in)
- Power: 22 bhp (16 kW) @ 7,500 rpm
- Transmission: Multiplate wet clutch, 5 speed
- Frame type: Single cradle
- Suspension: Front: telescopic forks Rear: swinging arm
- Brakes: Front (Mk 3): Twin-sided 180 mm (7.1 in) drum Front (Mk 3D): Single 280 mm (11 in) disc (Mk 3D); Rear: 160 mm (6.3 in) drum
- Tyres: Front: 300x19 Rear: 350x18
- Wheelbase: 1,360 mm (54 in)
- Dimensions: L: 2,000 mm (79 in); W: 780 mm (31 in)
- Seat height: 735 mm (28.9 in)
- Weight: 128 kg (282 lb) (dry)

The Ducati 239 Mark 3 is a 239 cc (14.6 cu in) single cylinder bevel drive SOHC motorcycle produced by the Italian manufacturer Ducati in limited quantities for the French market in 1974. The French Government has announced that they were to increase VAT on motorcycles of 240 cc and above in 1975. Ducati responded by producing the 239 to take advantage of the lower 20% VAT rate on sub-240 machines. To compensate for the reduced capacity, the engine was tuned to produce more power with a different camshaft, slipper piston, 30 mm carburettor and a different exhaust using a Lafranconi silencer.

The factory ceased production of OHC singles in 1974. The remaining stocks were purchased by the then British importer Coburn & Hughes, including some 239s, who continued to sell them until early 1976.

A desmodromic valve version, the Ducati 239 Mark 3D, was also available.

Total production was around 400 machines; 250 Mark 3s and 150 Mark 3Ds.

== Technical details ==
=== Engine and transmission ===
The single cylinder bevel drive OHC engine was of unit construction and had alloy head and alloy barrels with cast iron liners and was based on the 'wide case' engines used in the racers. bore and stroke were 72.5 mm × 57.8 mm (2.85 in × 2.28 in) giving a displacement of 239 cc (14.6 cu in). Coil valve springs were fitted which was a departure from Ducati's normal practice of fitting hairsprings on the OHC singles. Claimed power output was 22 bhp (16 kW) @ 7,500 rpm.

Fuel was delivered by a 30 mm Dell'Orto pumper carburettor, as used on the 750 GT. The engine used wet sump lubrication and electronic ignition.

Primary drive was by helical gears to a multi-plate wet clutch and 5 speed gearbox. Chain drive took power to the rear wheel.

=== Cycle parts ===
The single cradle frame was the same as the item used on the 250 and used the engine as a stressed member. Rear suspension was by swinging arm with twin 3-way adjustable Marzocchi shock absorbers. At the front 35 mm (1.4 in) Ceriani telescopic forks were fitted. The front brake was a twin-sided 180 mm (7.1 in) Grimeca drum on the Mark 3 and a single Brembo 280 mm (11 in) disc on the desmo. At the rear a 160 mm (6.3 in) drum was fitted on both models.

== 239 Mark 3D ==
An additional version of the 239 Mark 3 was offered, the 239 Mark 3D, also for the French market, that was fitted with a different head that used desmodromic valves. (A system where the valves are positively closed by extra lobes on the cam and levers rather than by a more conventional springs). The desmo was fitted with a disc brake on the front. Around 150 desmos were made.
