= Ducati Bipantah engine =

Ducati Bipantah

Overview
- Manufacturer: Ducati
- Production: prototype only

Layout
- Configuration: 90° V4 petrol engine
- Displacement: 994 cc (60.7 cu in)
- Cylinder bore: 78.0 mm (3.07 in)
- Piston stroke: 52.0 mm (2.05 in)
- Cylinder block material: Cast aluminium alloy
- Cylinder head material: Cast aluminium alloy
- Valvetrain: Desmodromic valve 2-valve/cyl

Combustion
- Fuel system: 4 Dell'Orto 40mm carburettors
- Fuel type: Petrol
- Oil system: Wet sump
- Cooling system: Air-oil cooling

Output
- Power output: 105–132 PS (77.2–97.1 kW; 103.6–130.2 bhp) @ 9,500–11,000 rpm

Dimensions
- Dry weight: 98 kg (216 lb)

Chronology
- Predecessor: Ducati Apollo
- Successor: Ducati Desmosedici

Ducati Bipantah was a prototype 90° V4 four-stroke motorcycle engine made by Ducati in 1981. It was designed by Pierluigi Mengoli under the supervision of Fabio Taglioni. It had four cylinders and made coupling two Ducati Pantah V-twin engines. It remained a prototype, although it had good results during dyno-tests. The project ended in late 1982, when then-owners VM Motori decided not to build the bike for which the motor was intended for.

== History ==
Ducati's technical director, Fabio Taglioni, desired to launch a whole new family of Ducati motorbikes to provide the manufacturer a solid position on markets, with reasonable production figures. At the beginning of the 1980s, world motorcycle sales were decreasing and the public was losing interest on Ducati V-twins models. So, Taglioni thought that a brand new project would be the best choice, but it had to be different from Japanese models: first he conceived a 90° V-4, a wooden-metal model of which was realized in 1980, then he ordered another 90° V-4 engine to be built, but with an "L" layout, the prototype of which was built in 1981, one year earlier than the launch of the then very innovative 750cc V-4 Honda VF.

BMW motorcycle division managers took the same technical/commercial direction with their new in-line four cylinder engine for K100. They wanted to produce higher range bikes, while the Japanese manufacturers were moving toward smaller 750 cc engines. VM Motori, which had owned Ducati since 1978, had different plans. Instead of investing money for a new range of bikes, they wanted to turn the Borgo Panigale factory into an engine supplier for other motorcycle manufacturers. In late 1982, the entire project was canceled.

Diesel engines, designed by VM Motori, along with Pantah engines, were produced at the Ducati plant at the time, with the latter provided to Cagiva for their bigger bikes. The high cost of retooling the factory for a new engine and new bike, the high price of which could lead to low sales, scared the VM Motori managers and the Castiglioni brothers at Cagiva. The Castiglioni's bought Ducati in May 1985. The new owners then decided to start new projects in order to compete with Japanese firms. After extensive technical discussions, they preferred Desmoquattro over Bipantah, because the first could be easily installed on the existing bikes.

== Technical overview ==
The name of the Bipantah engine is taken from the side by side coupling of two 500cc L-twin Ducati Pantah engines, sharing the same crankshaft. With a SOHC on each cylinder bank, to form a 1000cc 90° V-four.

This project embedded all of Taglioni's technical ideas that evolved from his dissertation written in 1948, that concerned a 250 cc 90° V4 engine. Bipantah was the most "oversquare" engine he designed (78mm bore x 52mm stroke = 994cc displacement), in order to reduce overall length and height for a better accommodation inside the frame. In spite of this, it was only 100 mm wider than a "single" Pantah. Rear cylinders were bolted almost vertically to the crankcase, while the front ones were almost horizontal. This arrangement was necessary as they were tilted 20° backwards to provide room for the front wheel to move during compression under braking. Taglioni preferred air cooling for thermodynamic, weight, and size reasons, so they were widely finned.

Other engine features were desmodromic valves, timing belts, two valves per cylinder (Taglioni did not love multi-valve), two-segment pistons (to reduce friction), a bearing type single-piece crankshaft with coupled connecting rods, and four 40mm Dell'Orto carburettors installed on long inlet manifolds between the cylinder banks.

Taglioni and his team dyno-tested the engine and claimed that Bipantah produced 105 PS (77.2 kW; 103.6 bhp) @ 9,500 rpm on the wheel with a significant thrust from 3,000 rpm in road legal camshaft/muffler configuration, while it produced 132 PS (97 kW; 130 bhp) @ 11,000 rpm (with thrust from 6,000 rpm) in racing configuration, with an expected power of 150 PS (110 kW; 148 bhp) if electronic fuel injection would have replaced carburetors.
