= Ducati 860 GT =

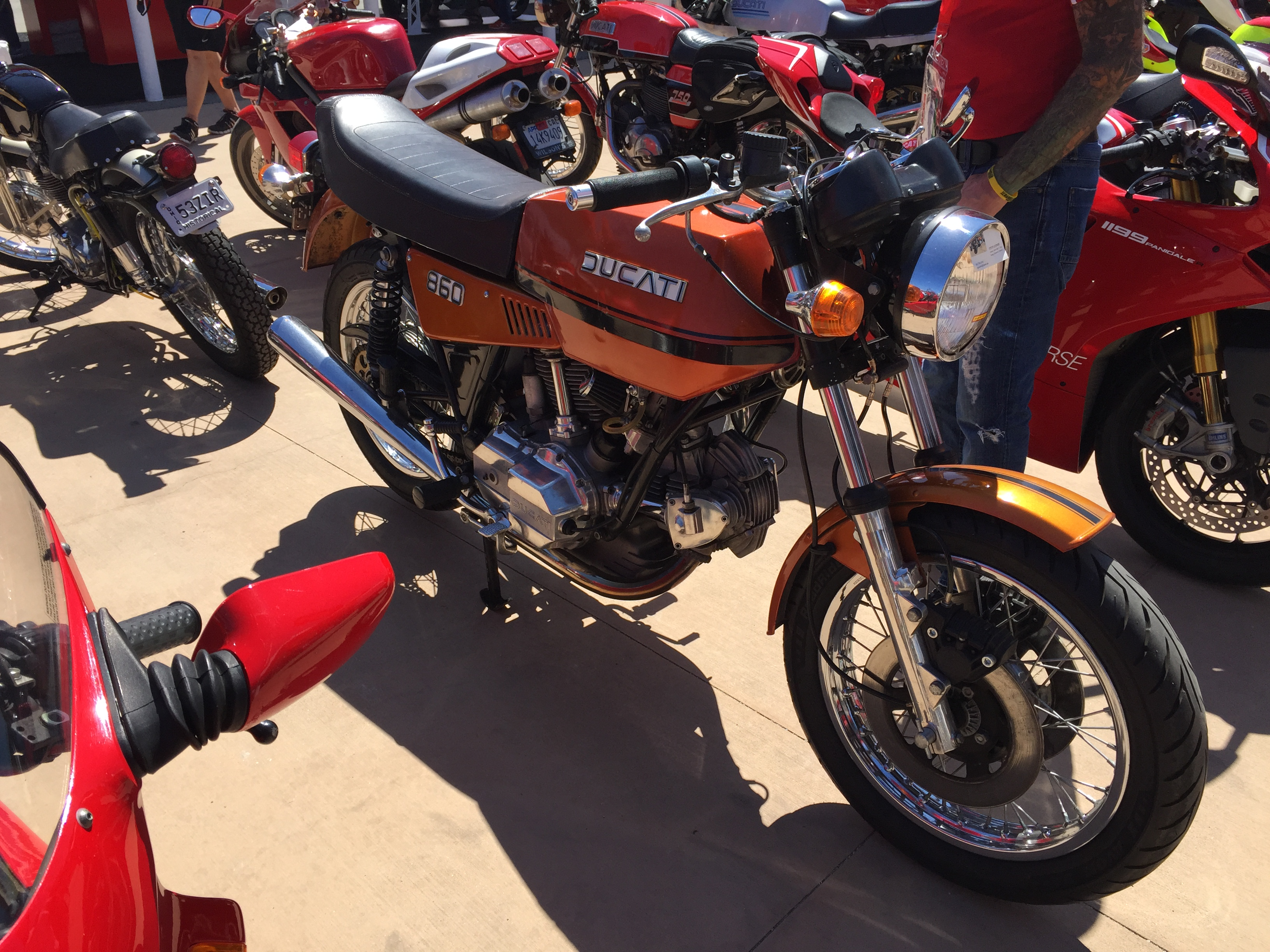
- Manufacturer: Ducati
- Also called: 860 GTE, 860 GTS, 900 GTS
- Production: 1974–1979
- Class: Standard or sport touring
- Engine: 863.9 cc (52.72 cu in) SOHC four stroke air cooled 90° V-twin
- Bore / stroke: 86.0 mm × 74.4 mm (3.39 in × 2.93 in)
- Compression ratio: 9.9:1
- Top speed: 109 mph (175 km/h)
- Power: 57 hp (43 kW) @ 7700 rpm 60 hp (45 kW) @ 6900 rpm
- Transmission: Wet multiplate clutch, 5 speed, chain drive
- Suspension: Front: telescopic fork, oil damped Rear: 3-way adjustable 2 320 mm Marzocchi shocks
- Brakes: Front: 1 (GT) or 2 (GTS) 280 mm discs, 1 piston calipers Rear:200 mm drum
- Tires: Front: 3.50" × 18"; Rear: 4.00"× 18"
- Wheelbase: 1,550 mm (61 in)
- Dimensions: L: 2,200 mm (87 in); W: 900 mm (35 in) (GT); 750 mm (30 in) (GTS); H: 1,170 mm (46 in)
- Seat height: 825 mm (32.5 in)
- Weight: 185 kg (408 lb) (dry); 229 kg (504 lb) (wet)
- Fuel capacity: 18 L (4.0 imp gal; 4.8 US gal)
- Fuel consumption: 35–45 mpg_{us}(6.7–5.2 L/100 km; 42–54 mpg-_{imp})

The Ducati 860 GT is a Ducati motorcycle that was produced in 1974 and 1975, replaced by the restyled 860 GTS for 1976–1979. In 1974–1975 the electric-start version was called the 860 GTE, while all models had electric start after 1975, and for the final two years, 1978–1979, the name was changed to 900 GTS. A USA market variant was made in all model years, in which the gearshift was "crudely moved" from the right to the left side of the engine by means an external rod.

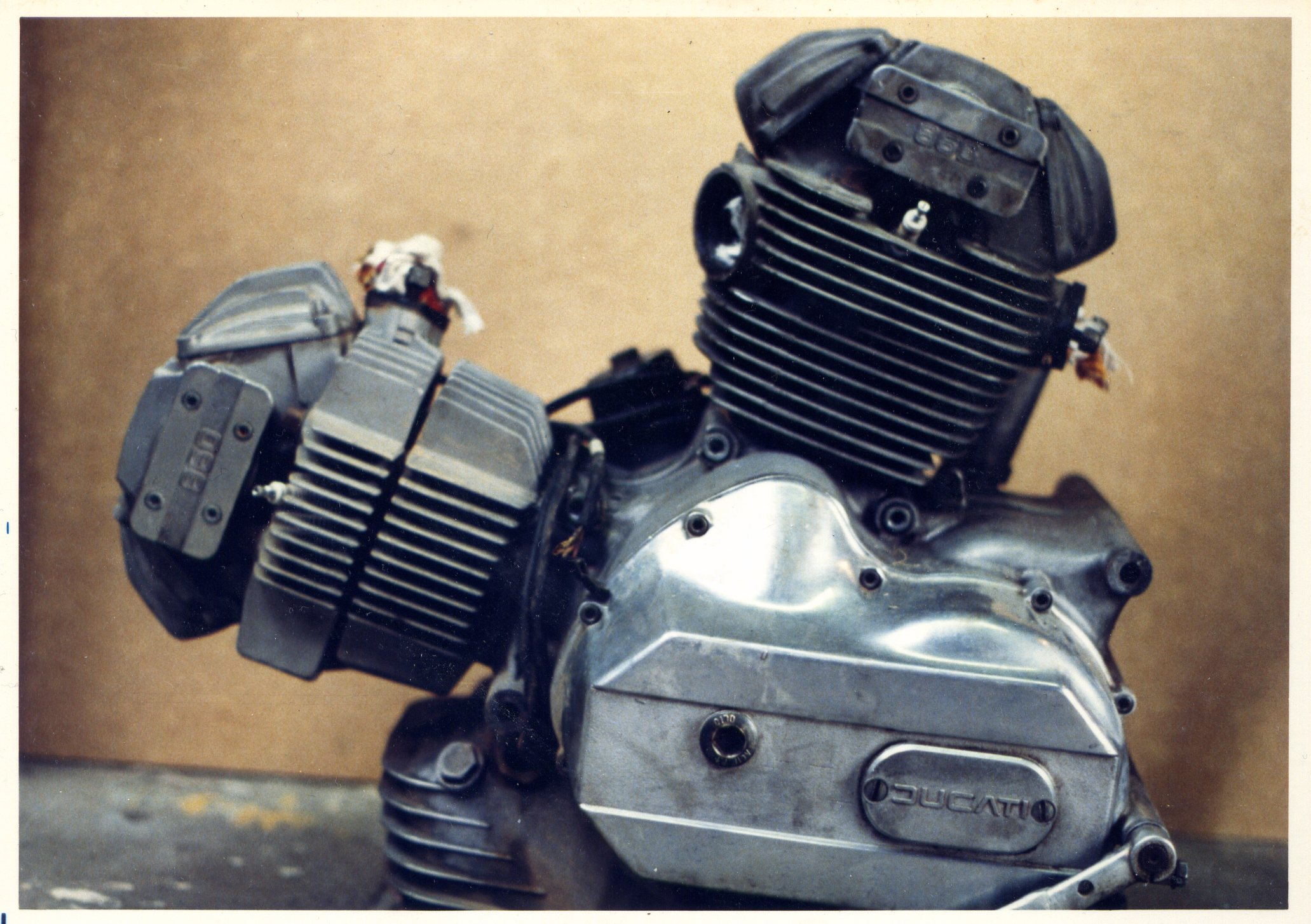
860 engine

The 860 series used the engine and stressed member frame of Fabio Taglioni's original 750 GT 90° V-twin, with bevel cam drive and with the enlarged capacity achieved by using two of the Ducati 450 single-cylinder engine's sleeves and pistons. The controversial angular design of the cosmetic elements was by noted car stylist Giorgetto Giugiaro. Giugiaro dispensed with both the sinuous tank shape and engine covers, and added large steel side covers to create an overall integrated effect.

Giugiaro's squared-off, 'folded paper' styling, which was successful in the automotive world, proved a shock to fans of the earlier 'round case' Ducati 750 twins, styled by Fabio Taglioni and Leopold Tartarini. The earlier Ducati 750 twins had rounded engine cases and cafe racer styling, and were considered 'instant classics'. The new 'square' styling of the 860 twins was rejected in the marketplace, and sales dropped precipitously, forcing Ducati to re-style the 860GT for the next season (1976).

The 860 GT was renamed the 860GTS in 1976 and featured a less angular fuel tank than the GT; a seat without the duck-tail; lower, narrower handlebars and a decreased final drive ratio. By 1977 further cosmetic and electrical enhancements were introduced in the again renamed 900 GTS. Production ceased in 1979, with these later bikes having engines mechanically similar to the Darmah SS and SD bikes that replaced them.

== See also ==
- Ducati V-twin motorcycles
