= Ducati Supersport =

Italian air-cooled 4 stroke desmodromic 2-valve 90° L-twin motorcycle

Ducati Supersport SS
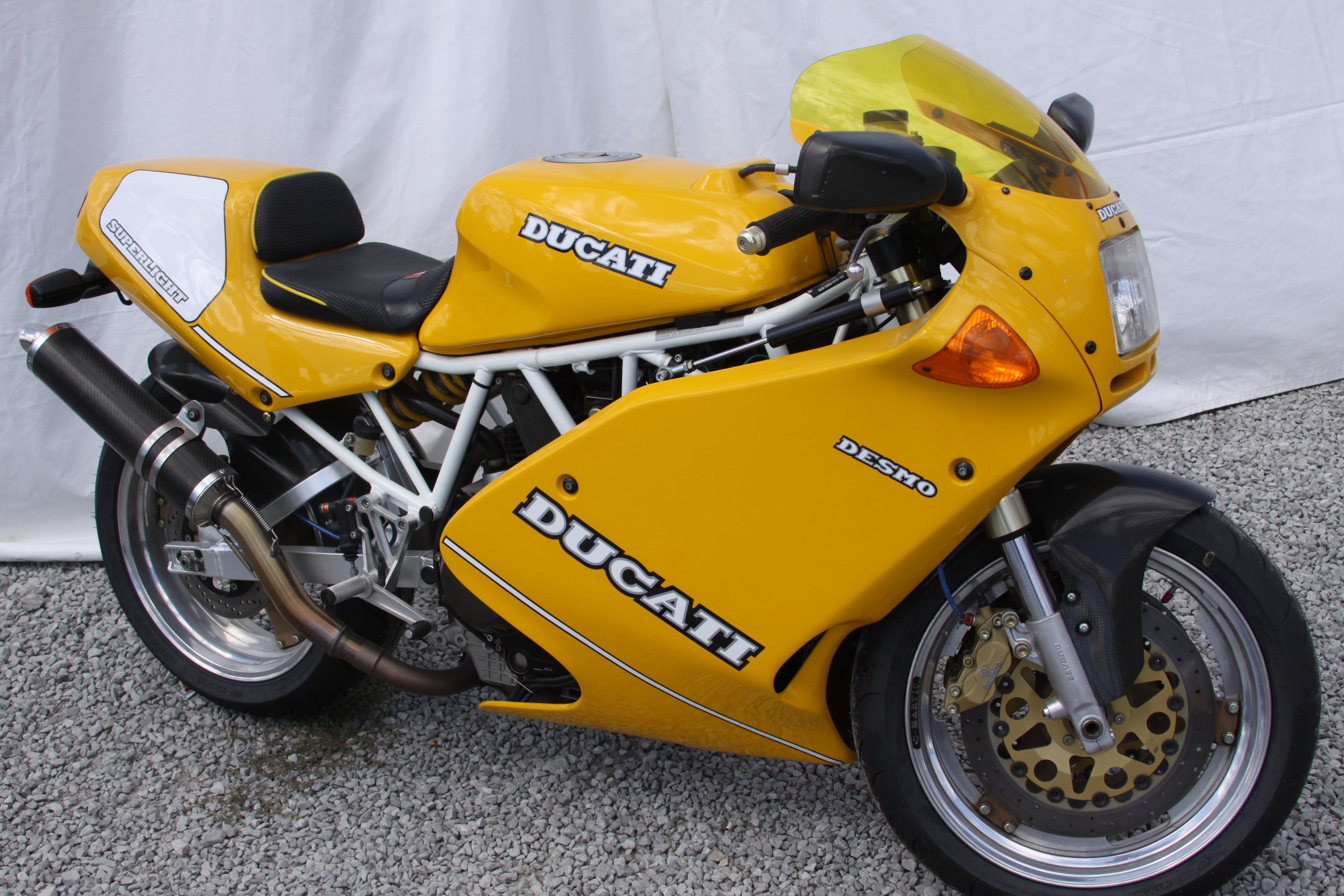
- Ducati 900 SS Superlight
- Manufacturer: Ducati
- Also called: SS
- Production: 1972–1981; 1988–2007
- Predecessor: Pantah
- Successor: Ducati Supersport 950
- Class: Sportbike
- Engine: 904 cc SOHC 2-valve Desmo 90° V-twin
- Bore / stroke: 92 mm × 68 mm (3.6 in × 2.7 in)
- Compression ratio: 9.2:1
- Power: 80 hp @ 7,500 rpm
- Torque: 57 ft·lbf (77 N·m) @ 6,500 rpm
- Transmission: Close ratio 6-speed
- Suspension: Showa
- Brakes: Brembo
- Wheelbase: 1988: 1310 mm 1999: 1395 mm (55.6 in)
- Seat height: 820 mm (32.3 in)
- Weight: 1988: 198 kg 1999: 188 kg (414 lb) (dry)
- Fuel capacity: 16 L (3.5 imp gal; 4.2 US gal), including 4 L (0.88 imp gal; 1.1 US gal) reserve

The Ducati Supersport and SS are a series of air-cooled four stroke desmodromic 2-valve 90° L-twin motorcycles made by Ducati from 1988 to 2007. A limited-edition Supersport, the SuperLight, was sold in 1992. The name harked back to the round-case 1973 Ducati 750 Super Sport and the 1975 square-case 750 and 900 Super Sport. The appellation 'SS' was applied only to the later belt drive (Pantah) based models.

== History (1972–1981) ==
=== Miglia di Imola, 1972 ===
Modern Ducati, as well as the Super Sport can be traced back to April 1972 when Ducati won the Imola 200 (the European equivalent of the Daytona 200) with a for-production based 750 cc, desmodromic valve 90° V-twin engine developed by Fabio Taglioni. Ducati markets their 90° V-twin as "L-twin" to emphasize its 90° V angle and differentiate their motorcycles from competing V-twins. Imola was a traditionally fast circuit that placed a premium on high-speed handling rather than brute horsepower. The Super Sport prototypes used for the inaugural race were developed using a 750 GT based engine and frame and earned instant fame when legendary racer Paul Smart and Bruno Spaggiari finished first and second, respectively, immediately elevating Ducati from a company known for "quaintly individual" motorcycles and into the superbike market.

=== Super Sport Prototype ===
The first official Super Sport prototypes used the 750 Sport and 750 GT models for their basis, but featured bodywork styled along the lines of the Imola bikes. The frame was painted blue while the fiberglass gas tank, covers and top half of the fairing were silver. The gas tank also featured a unique translucent strip to be able to quickly see the fuel level.

=== 1974 Super Sport ===
1974 marked the first year of mass production of Super Sport. The bike featured 10.5:1 compression ratio, a voluminous 6 gallon gas tank and a claimed weight of 333 lb (151 kg). A mere 401 1974 Super Sports were produced and the bike immediately set new standards for production motorcycles and had unique styling, but for all intents and purposes it was a pure production racer with the minimum of concessions to make it street legal. Unfortunately, the complicated bevel gear-driven camshaft made the bike uneconomical to produce, thus the 1974 model is the only round-case 90-degree v-twin with desmodromic valve gear. However the 1974 model bike is considered to be the most significant production bike in Ducati's history, mostly because it offered the highest standards of handling and performance available at that time and essentially saved Ducati from extinction.

=== 1975–1981 Square Case Super Sport ===
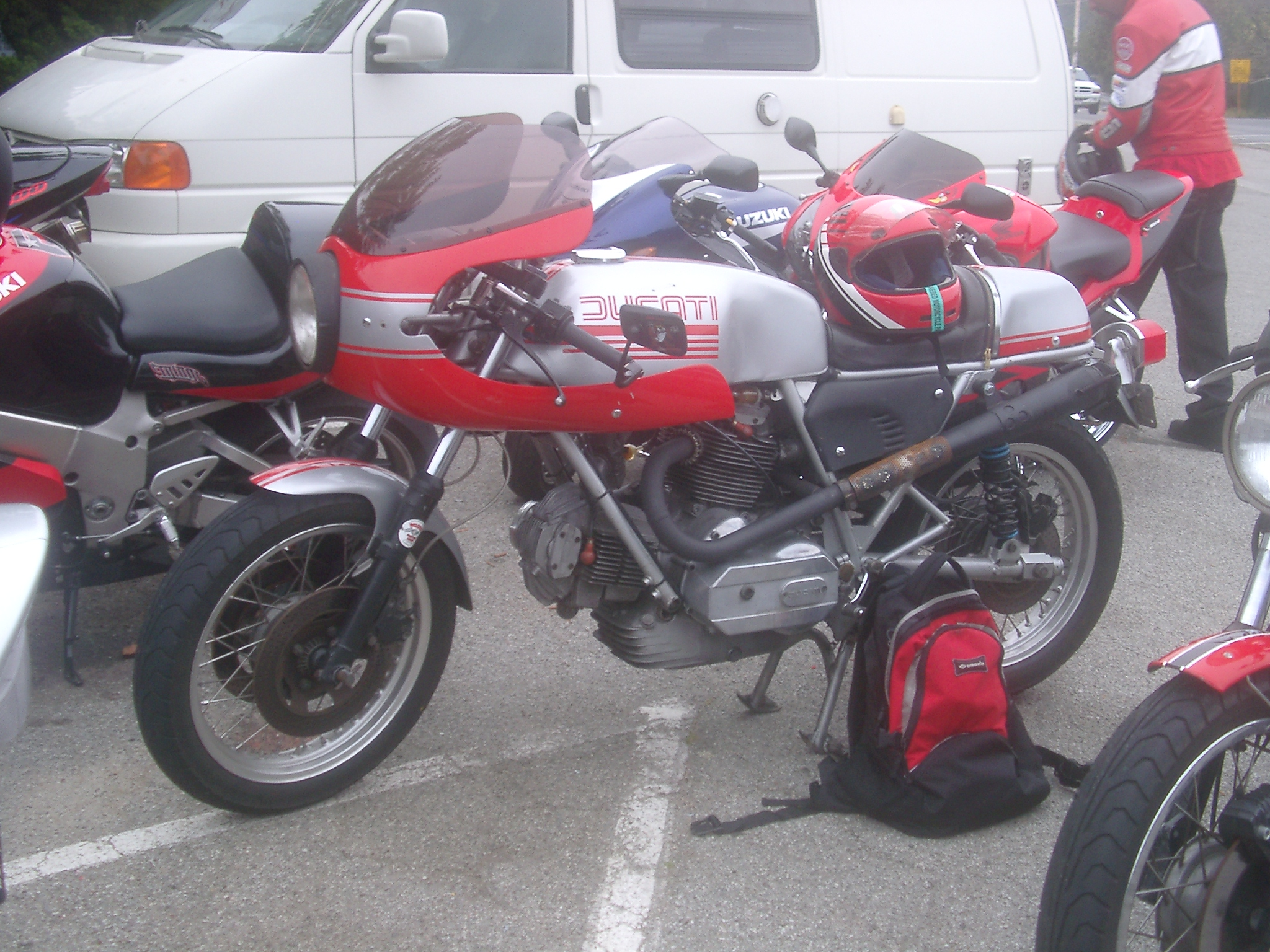
Square Case Ducati Super Sport

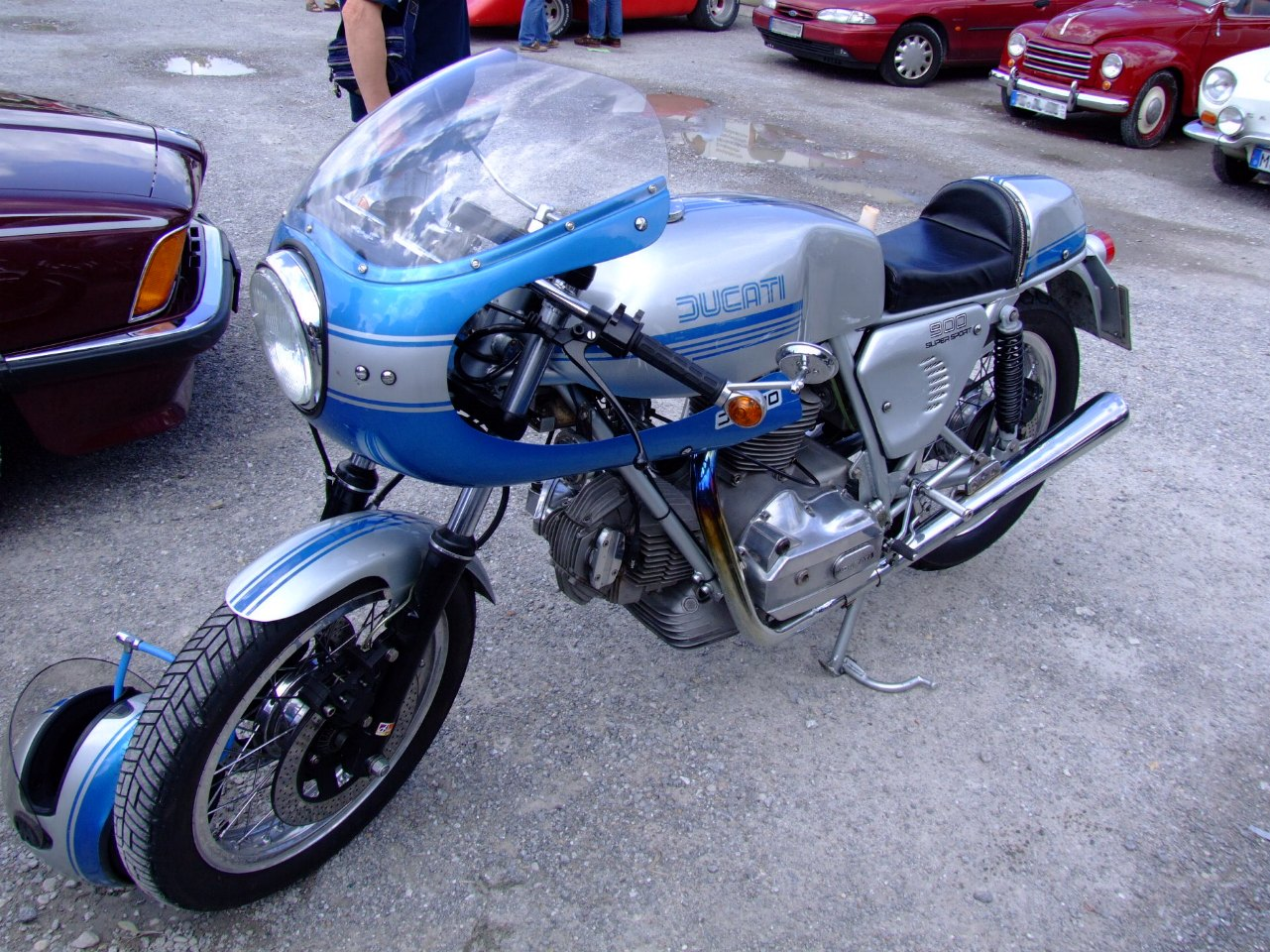
900 Supersport

In 1975, two versions of the Super Sport were made available based on the 864 cc "square-case" 90-degree twin cylinder motor; the full 864 cc version coined the 900 and a sleeved down 750. 250 examples of each were produced but the 750 and 900 are virtually identical. The 1975 Super Sport continued to use the right-side gear shift, contradicting the 1974 U.S. regulation that all bikes have the gear shifting on the left side of the engine. Despite this, a handful of right side Super Sports have made it into the United States.

Most of the subsequent changes made to the Super Sport model were to comply with global legislation. Quieter mufflers, relocated shifting and rear brake and new foot pegs. The biggest improvement was the redesign of the kick-starter. On the 1975 model the kick starter would rotate around and shift the transmission into first gear. If the bike was not on the center-stand the rider could potentially have a very unpleasant surprise.

Because the price of the 750 Super Sport was very similar to 900, very few 750s were produced with the majority of them being shipped to Australia, Germany or staying in Italy for racing applications.

By 1978 the bike looked identical, but several significant improvements had made their way into the motor making them more reliable and solving problems with engine cranks breaking. The electronics also improved as well as some minor timing tweaks making the bike run more efficiently. Most notable was a majorly redesigned gear shifter that made the bike a lot easier for owners to live with. Most 1978 900 Super Sports also came with a dual seat and lockable tool box. The solo seat was available as an option. The 1978 model bike is considered to be the finest iteration of the bevel drive square case Super Sports. The 1978 900 and 1979 750s were the last to retain close links with the Imola racers and the last to come with traditional spoke wheels. it was also in 1978 that the Isle of Man TT Formula 1 race was won by a 900 Super Sport, ridden by former World Champion Mike Hailwood in a popular comeback race.

In 1979 the Super Sports were painted black with gold accents to appeal to the British market. Cast Campagnolo wheels replaced the Borrani alloy rims and a Mike Hailwood Replica was made available in very limited numbers painted in lavish green and red schemes. The new changes, specifically the black and gold paint and cast wheels were very successful at making an aging design look more modern. The 1980 model stayed essentially the same with no notable changes. Essentially, the Super Sport was being transitioned into the Mike Hailwood Replica.

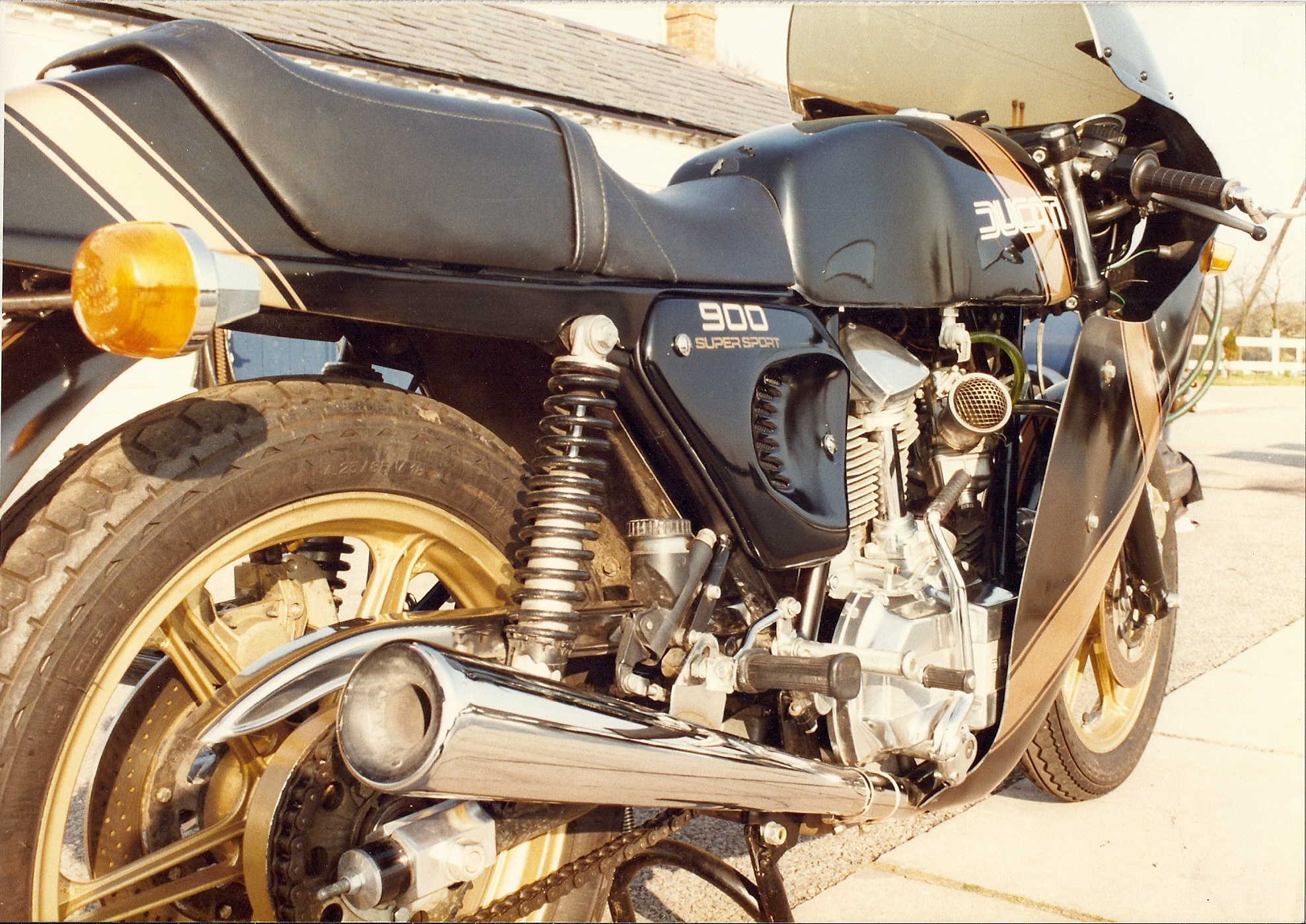
1981 900SS (UK spec) - Showing revised tail section, side panels, Campagnolo cast wheels and 40mm Dell'Orto carburetor, with Conti-replica exhausts and Mike Hailwood fairing

Into the early 1980s the fuel tank became less angular and more rounded while the tail section was revised to look more modern with a duck-tail sweep. Side covers were integrated into the tail-section and swoopy paint lines tried to connect the design together. All in all, the early 80s Super Sports were somewhat uninspiring and were met with limited success.

In 1982 the Super Sport was replaced, mostly in name only, by the S2.

== Ducati Supersport (SS) (1988–2007) ==
Announced in 1988, the Ducati Supersport used a Pantah based 904 cc air-cooled 90° V-twin, two-valve "Desmodue" engine with crankcases derived from the 851 motor. It was mounted in a tubular trellis frame. The resurrection was due largely to Ducati being bought out by Cagiva and the first reborn Supersport was released as a 750 Sport. It met with failure due to its 16-inch wheels and a kludgy Weber carburetor and cracking swingarms.

From 1988 to 1991, the model was called a 900 Supersport, and had a full fairing. The 1989 Supersport received a revised air/oil cooled motor from the 906cc Ducati Paso incorporating many changes to the Pantah motor, including a six-speed gear box. From 1989 to 1990 the motorcycle was fitted with a Marzocchi rear suspension, then first changed to Showa, and then to better quality Marzocchi damping in 1990. Marzocchi M1BB front forks were used until 1990, when they were replaced by Showa upside down units. The Marelli Digiplex ignition was used in early models, and then replaced by a Kokusan ignition.

=== Smaller Supersports: 350SS/400SS/600SS ===
Ducati 350SS, 400SS and 600SS
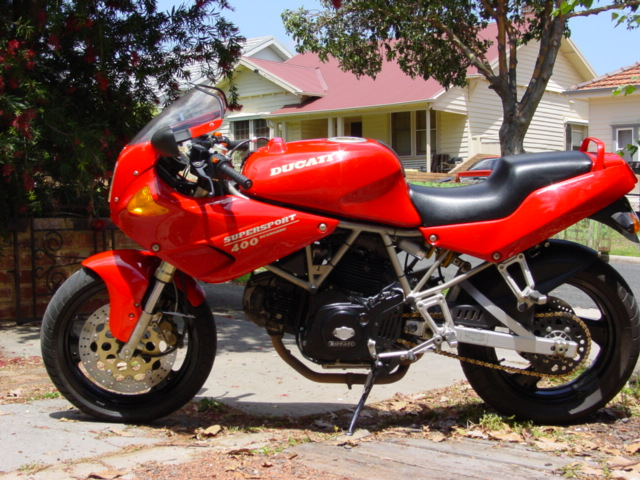
- Ducati 400SS
- Manufacturer: Ducati
- Also called: 350/400 Supersport, 400 Junior
- Production: 1991–1993 (350); 1989–1997 (400); 1993-1999 (600)
- Class: Sport bike
- Engine: 349 cc (21.3 cu in); 398 cc (24.3 cu in); 583 cc (35.6 cu in) 4-stroke air-cooled desmodromic 90° V-twin
- Bore / stroke: 66.0 mm × 51.0 mm (2.60 in × 2.01 in); 70.5 mm × 51.0 mm (2.78 in × 2.01 in); 80.0 mm × 58.0 mm (3.15 in × 2.28 in)
- Top speed: 180 km/h (110 mph) (350 and 400)
- Power: 36 hp (27 kW) @10,500 rpm (350); 42 hp (31 kW) @10,000 rpm (400); 53 hp (40 kW) @8,250 rpm (600)
- Transmission: Dry clutch (1991), wet clutch (1992–1998); 6-speed, chain drive
- Brakes: Front: 320 mm disc Rear: 245 mm disc
- Tires: Front: 120/60x17 Rear: 160/60x17
- Wheelbase: 1,410 mm (56 in)
- Dimensions: L: 2,010 mm (79 in); W: 730 mm (29 in); H: 1,110 mm (44 in)
- Seat height: 770 mm (30 in)
- Weight: 169 kg (373 lb) (350); 173 kg (381 lb) (400); 172 kg (379 lb) (600) (dry)
- Fuel capacity: 17.5 L (3.8 imp gal; 4.6 US gal)

The Ducati 350SS, Ducati 400SS and Ducati 600SS were Ducati sport bike motorcycles made from 1989 through 1999 for the Japanese and Italian markets.

The 350/400 SS models were produced to meet regulations under the prevailing driving license schemes in Japan (400 cc) and Italy (350 cc), where there were limits on maximum displacement allowed for probationary motorcyclists. The 600SS was introduced in 1994 as a midrange competitor for a growing market, and to provide a cheap way to spread the Ducati range. Visually, they are only slightly different from the other SS models.

Also known as the 400SS Junior, the models were based on the larger 750SS with which they shared a frame, engine and most other components. The most obvious differences were the 2-into-1 exhaust system on some versions (also used the 600) and the single-disc front brake. The 600SS had five gears instead of the six on the 350 and 400. The smaller engine capacity was achieved by sleeving down the larger 750SS engine. The models were available semi-faired or with a full fairing. As with the Ducati 750SS and 900SS, vents were provided in the cowl in the 1997 model to provide additional air to the rear cylinder, which was prone to overheating.

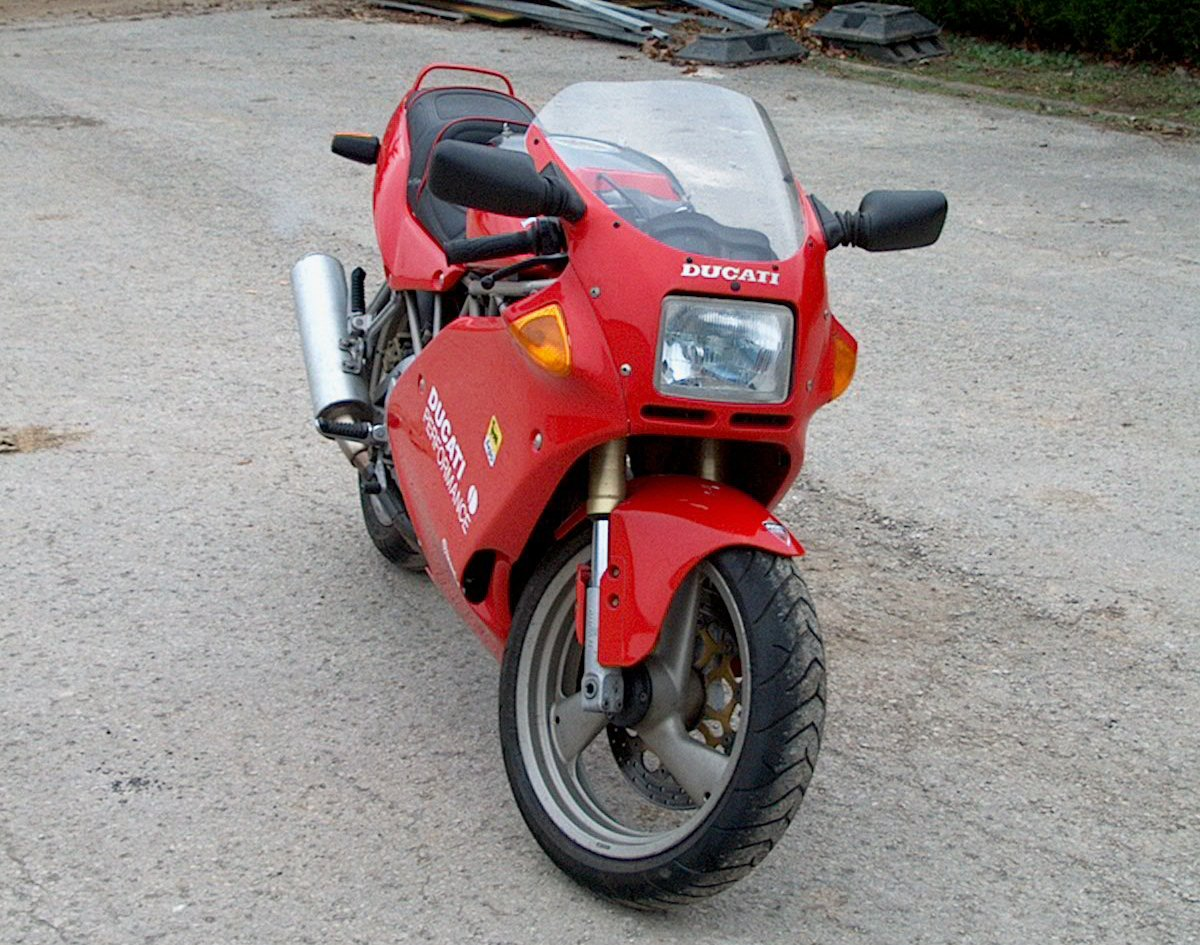
600 SS front

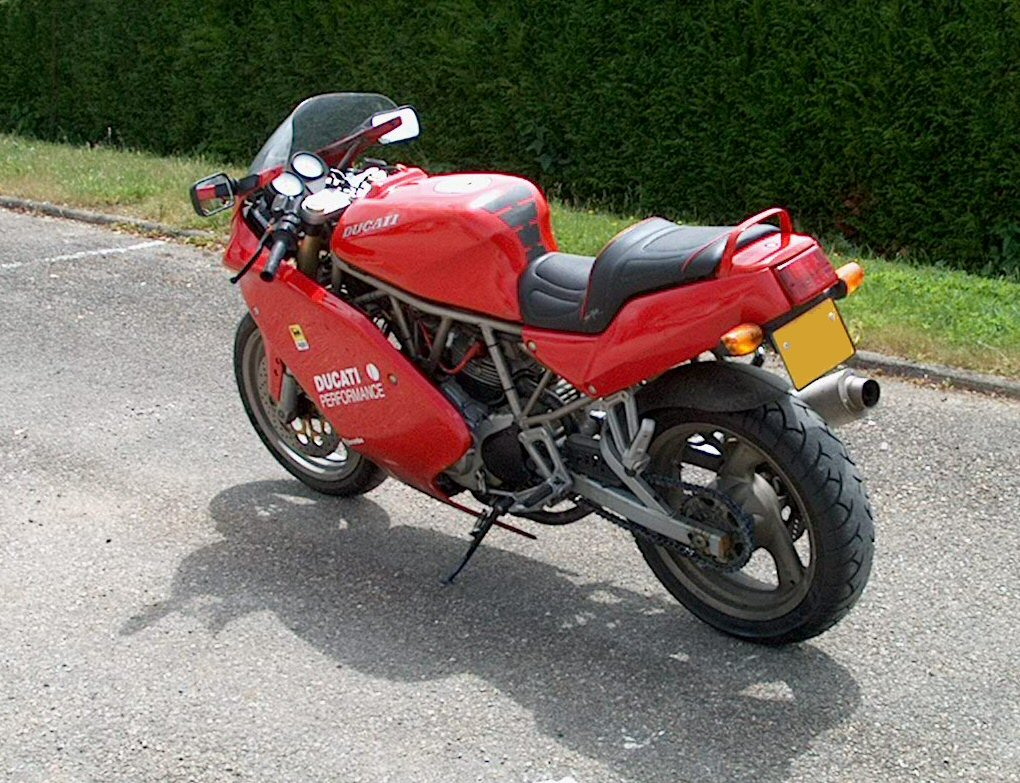
600 SS rear

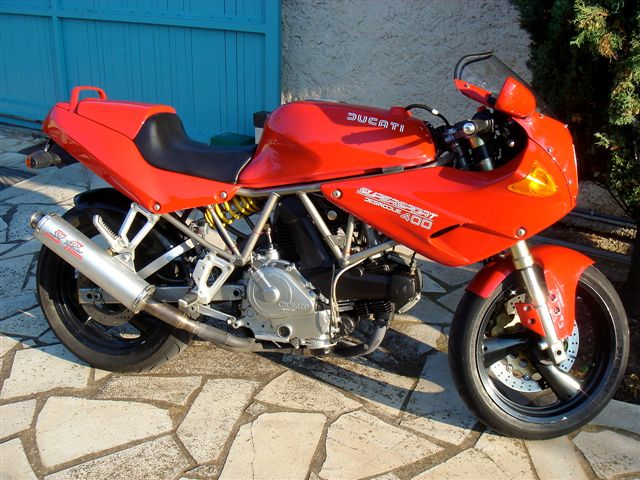
400 SS

=== 1991–1998 ===
The 1991 Supersports were produced with white chrome molybdenum steel frames and white wheels. The swingarms used needle bearings instead of bushings as in the past. Brakes from the Ducati 851 were used on the Supersport vastly improving braking performance. All new bodywork and a pivoting fuel tank were elegantly shaped. The revised Supersports were met with immediate success and became wildly popular. Even though the 1991 Supersport was extremely well developed, Ducati would continue to refine the bike over the years.

From 1991 to 1998, the model was called 900 SS or 750 SS, and was available with a full (SS) or half fairing (SS/CR). 1992 saw the addition to the SS/SL (Superlight). In 1994, to further differentiate the 900 from smaller Supersports additional models were released in addition the Superlight. The 900 SS/SP (Sport Production) was offered to the North American market only. This model had carbon fiber fenders and clutch cover, sound damping material, adjustable Showa suspension, and an aluminum swingarm. The Superlight had the same options as the SS SP but with a single seat and upswept mufflers. The CRs came with a non adjustable suspension, a steel swingarm, and a narrower 4.5-inch rear wheel and 160 section rear tire. Many riders feel the aluminum swingarms are more desirable; however aluminum swingarms on older Supersports and Monsters are prone to cracking.

In 1997, as Supersport sales were declining due to the popularity of the Ducati Monster and Ducati Superbike lines, Ducati attempted to keep the model alive with a few final changes. Yellow was added as a color option, an additional air intake was added as well as new, bolder graphics; namely the "Ducati" emblazoned across the entire side of the Supersport body panel.

In 1998, only 200 red and 200 yellow SS/CRs were imported to the United States. They featured the last of the Cagiva graphics and elephant but had 1998 spec. motors with new pistons, cylinders and lower mounted oil cooler. A final series Supersport the SS/FE (Final Edition) was also available in 1998, but featured the new graphics, came only in silver with black wheels, had the single seat and upswept exhausts of the Superlight and represented the last carburated Supersport.

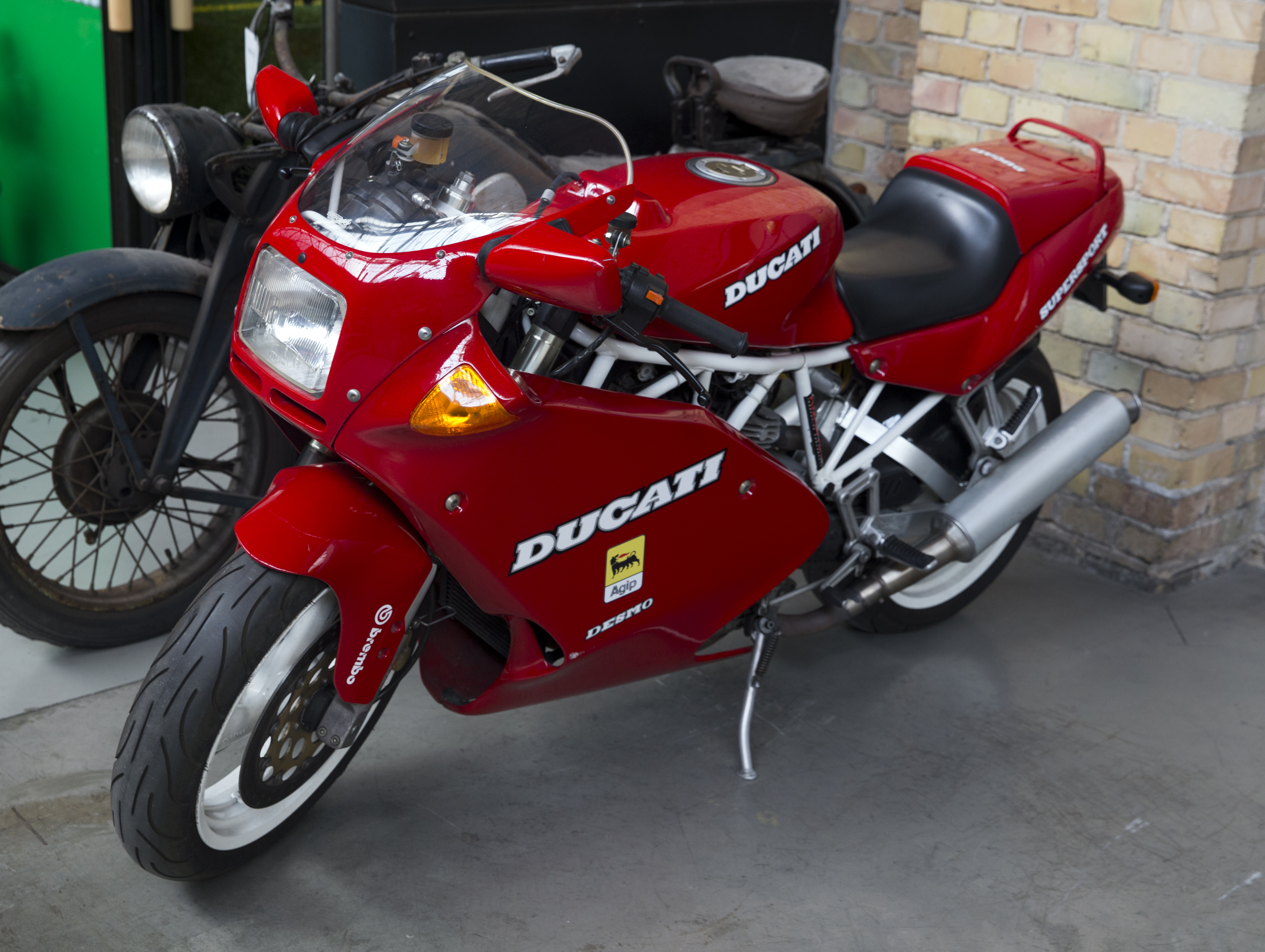
Ducati 750 SS Mk I (1991 or 1992)

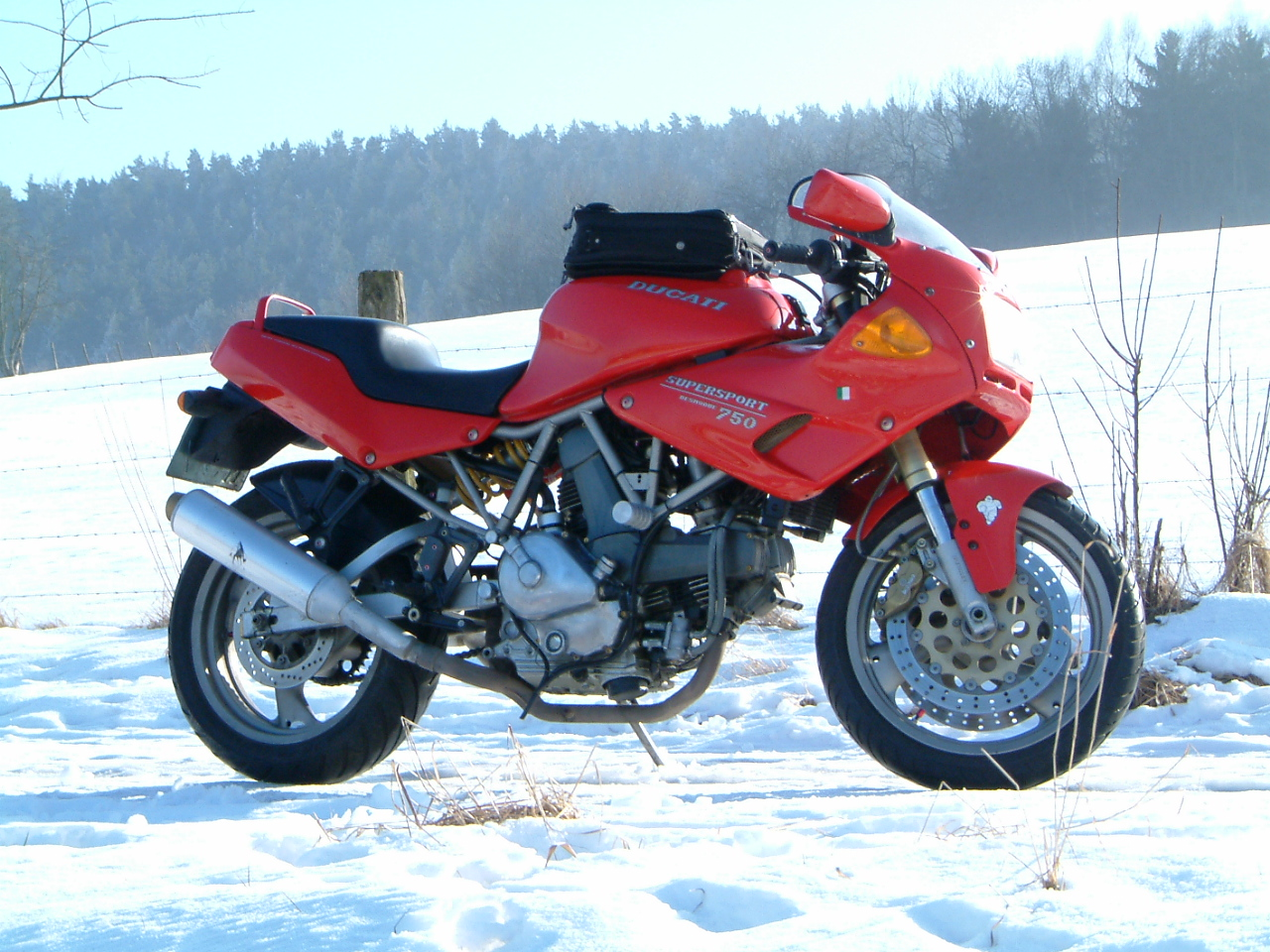
Ducati 750 SS/CR 1994

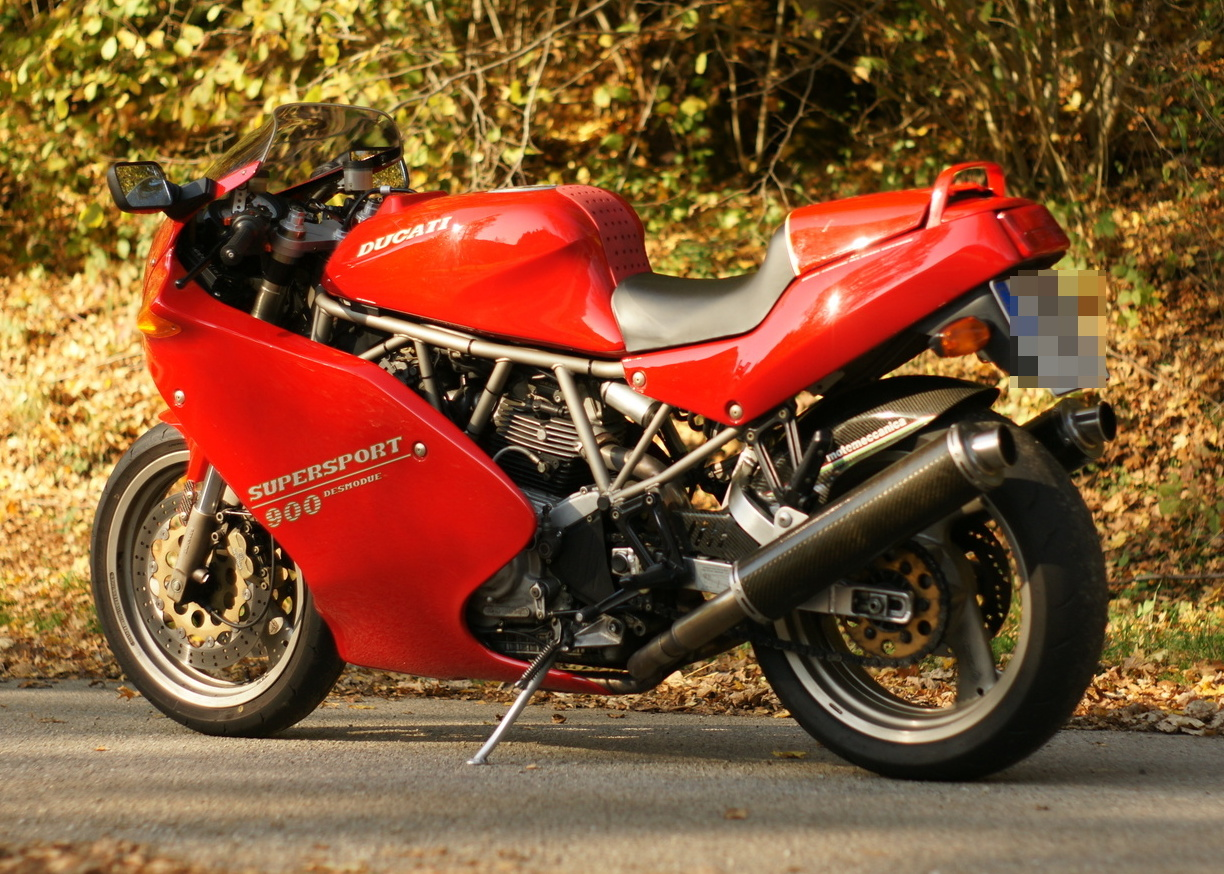
Ducati 900SS Carenata 1996

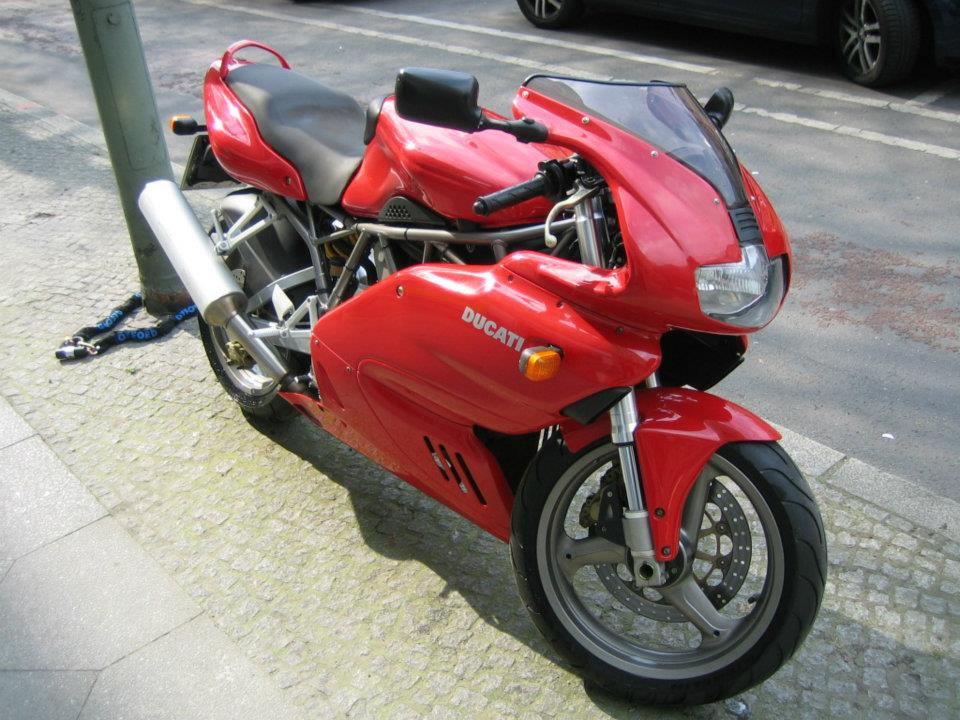
Ducati 750 SS i.e. 2001

=== Ducati Superlight ===
In 1992 Ducati unveiled the limited edition 900 Superlight following the success on the 1991 Supersport. The chassis and engine were from the 1992 Supersport but there were a few details that set the Superlight apart. These included a vented clutch cover, fully floating cast-iron front disc brakes, and larger diameter exhaust silencers (from the 888 SP4).

1992 Ducati 900 Superlight

Each model of the Superlight came with sought after performance improvements over the standard model Supersport (SS) such as carbon fibre front mudguard and rear hugger, solo seat unit, up-swept exhausts, upgraded cast iron brake discs and a numbered plaque on the top triple clamp, making them extremely desirable and collectable among enthusiasts and collectors alike. Earlier models featured lightweight 17-inch Marvic/Akront composite wheels. Following on the from the success of the 1992 version, the Superlight specification was downgraded for 1993 which increased the weight of the bike (known as the Mk II). The wheels were regular Brembo and the front discs were now stainless steel. The vented clutch cover disappeared.

The 1993 Superlights still came with the numbered plaque on the triple clamp. For 1994 the Superlight (Mk III) was upgraded with a return of the cast-iron disc brakes, upgraded front forks and a stronger aluminium swingarm along with other general differences that were shared with the standard 900SS. Only minor detail changes were made on the Superlight (Mk IV) for 1995 and the Superlight (Mk V) for 1996.

With the release of the new Supersport imminent, a Final Edition was offered in 1998. It was silver in colour with black wheels with much of the specifications the same as the earlier Superlight. All of the Final Editions came with a numbered plaque.

Production figures for the superlight:

- Mk I 952
- Mk II 755
- Mk III 756
- Mk IV 550
- Mk V 309
- Final Edition 800

Ducati have never officially released the production numbers for each year, they did supply the production numbers to Ducati expert and historian Ian Falloon who included them in his publication Standard Catalog of Ducati Motorcycles.

=== 1999–2007 ===
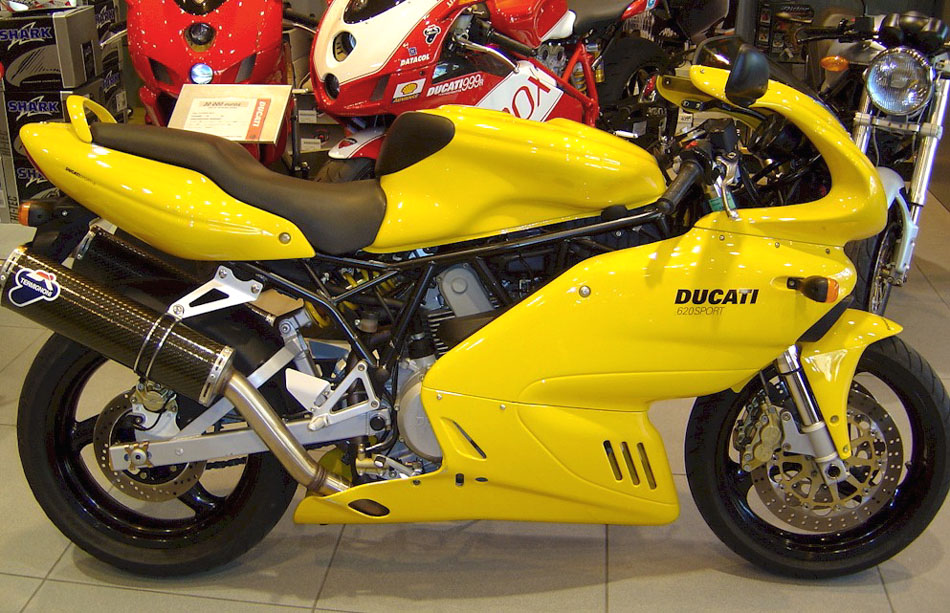
Ducati Super Sport

In 1999, the Supersport had a major facelift. The fairing was redesigned after the Ducati Supermono and fuel injection introduced. The 1999 model was one of the first Ducatis designed by Pierre Terblanche and met with very limited success based on its controversial aesthetics. The SS was available with 750 cc and 900 cc engines, both offered with either full fairing or half fairing. A lower spec 750 Sport model was offered in 2001 and 2002, only in matte black, with a half fairing, and with a five-speed transmission rather than the six-speed unit on the Supersports.

In 2003 Ducati replaced the 750 and 900 with three new variations: 620 cc, 800 cc and 1000 cc. Only the 620 was offered with half fairing.

Eventually, only the 1,000 cc version remained available, which was finally discontinued in 2007. The Supersport 1000 DS had a 992 cc, air-cooled 90° V-twin engine with twin spark ignition, which Ducati described as "the most advanced air-cooled Desmo engine ever to be built by Ducati." The front suspension had fully adjustable 43 mm Showa forks, with an Ohlins single shock (also fully adjustable) at the back. The Supersport 1000 DS had a pair of Brembo Gold Series callipers with 320 mm discs at the front and a single 245 mm disc at the rear, along with lightweight 5-spoke Marchesini wheels. The Supersport 1000 DS produced 95.2 N⋅m (70 lb⋅ft) of torque at 5750 rpm, and 95 hp (70 kW) of power at 7750 rpm.

The SS naming convention was eventually dropped and the line evolved into the SportClassic line that includes the Sport 1000 and GT 1000, and another Paul Smart replica, the PaulSmart 1000 LE.

==== Ducati 800SS ====
Ducati 800 Supersport
- Manufacturer: Ducati
- Parent company: Ducati Motor Holdings, SpA
- Predecessor: Ducati 750 Supersport
- Class: Sportbike
- Engine: 803 cc (49.0 cu in) Air-cooled, four-stroke, 90° V-twin, SOHC, 2 Desmodromic valves per cylinder
- Bore / stroke: 88.0 mm × 66.0 mm (3.46 in × 2.60 in)
- Compression ratio: 10.5:1
- Transmission: 6-speed
- Wheelbase: 55.3 inches (1,400 mm)
- Seat height: 32.1 inches (820 mm)
- Weight: 406 pounds (184 kg) (dry)
- Fuel capacity: 16 L (3.5 imp gal; 4.2 US gal); Reserve: 4 L

The Ducati 800SS, introduced in 2003, is the smaller capacity, higher revving version of that year's air-cooled Ducati Supersport (SS) model range.

The 800SS is a popular base for production racing in the United States, where it competes against motorcycles such as the Suzuki SV650. It is also eligible for racing in the UK in the Minitwins series with a variety of clubs such as BMCRC, North Gloucester Road Racing Club (NGRRC), and the North East Motorcycle Racing Club (NEMCRC).

In 2003 a new fuel-injected desmodromic 90° V-twin, 88 mm × 66 mm (3.5 in × 2.6 in), 803 cc (49.0 cu in) engine, and a new six-speed gearbox were offered in the Supersport 800. There were two versions available: the 800 Supersport and the 800 Sport. The Supersport featured a high specification chassis whilst the Sport was a lower cost version with a less well-specified chassis. Both used the same engine and came in with either a full fairing or half-fairing. The two-valve per cylinder engine produced 74.5 hp @ 8250 rpm, and 70 N·m (7.1 kgf·m) @ 6250 rpm.

Earlier 2003-2004 Supersport models had a high-specification chassis featuring fully adjustable Showa front forks and a fully adjustable Sachs shock absorber. From 2004 onwards Ducati reduced the level of chassis specification to that of the Sport (which was subsequently dropped from the range some time later). The alloy swinging arm was replaced with a steel item; the five-spoke Marchesini wheels were replaced by three-spoke wheels by Brembo; the front forks were replaced by non-adjustable Marzocchi items; the Brembo Goldline clutch and brake master cylinder were replaced with lower specification items as found on many lower-capacity Ducati Monsters.

From 2006 the 800SS was no longer imported into the UK although it was still available in the United States in limited numbers in 2007.

== Ducati Supersport 950 (2017–) ==
Ducati Supersport 950
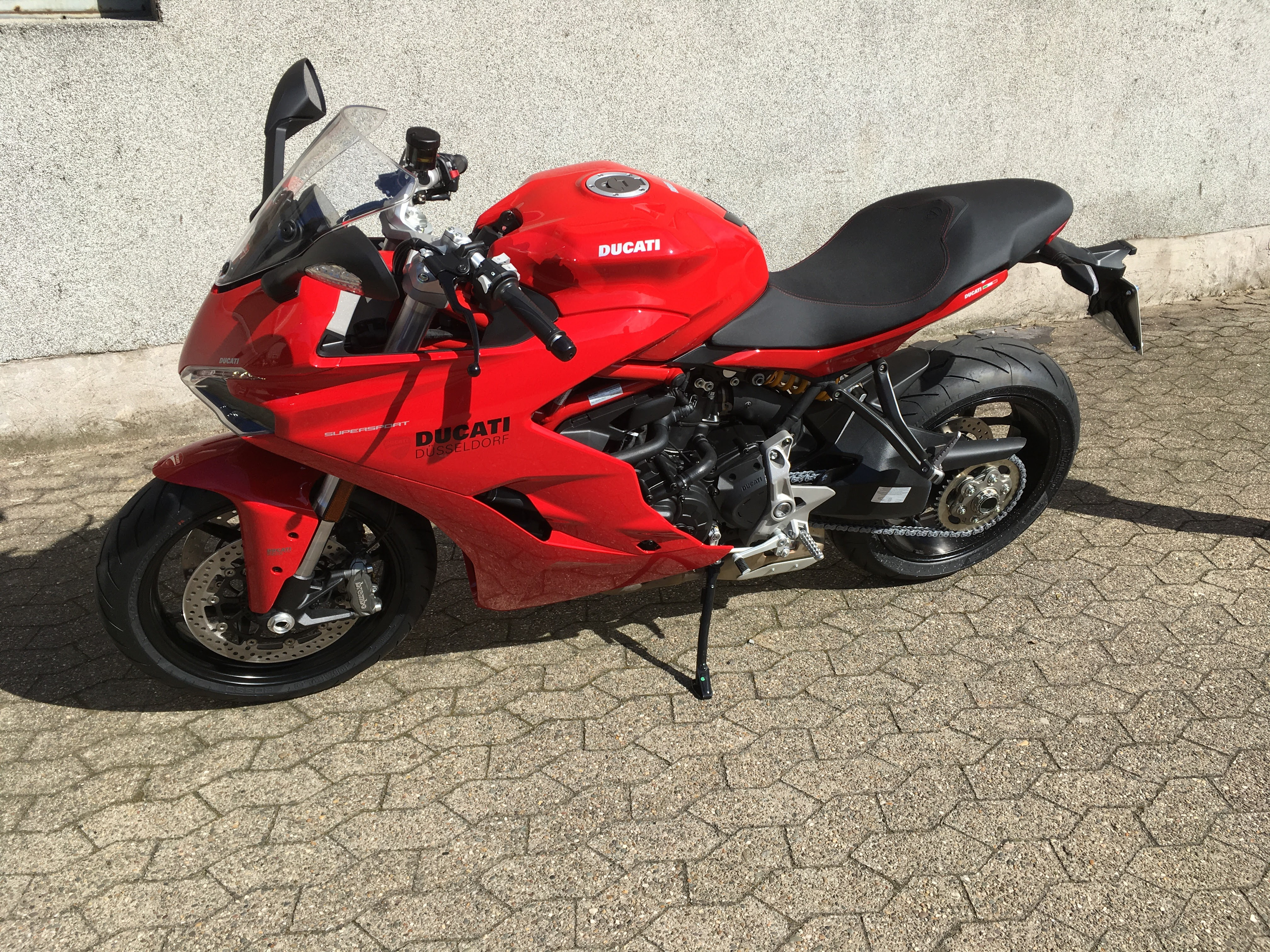
- Manufacturer: Ducati
- Production: 2017–
- Class: Sport bike
- Engine: Liquid cooled 11° 937 cc (57.2 cu in) L-twin, 4-valve/cyl desmodromic
- Bore / stroke: 94 mm × 67.5 mm (3.70 in × 2.66 in)
- Compression ratio: 12.6:1
- Power: 110 hp (81 kW) @ 9,000 rpm
- Torque: 93 N⋅m (69 lb⋅ft) @ 6,500 rpm
- Transmission: 6-speed with Ducati Quick Shift (DQS) up, down EVO.
- Frame type: Tubular steel Trellis frame attached to the cylinderhead
- Suspension: Front: Fully adjustable 43 mm (1.7 in) usd Marzocchi fork
- Brakes: Front: Brembo radial monobloc calipers, 2×320 mm (13 in) discs Rear: 245 mm (9.6 in) disc, Cornering ABS EVO
- Tires: Front: 120/70 ZR17; Rear: 180/55 ZR17
- Rake, trail: Rake: 24° Front trail: 94mm
- Wheelbase: 1,478 mm (58.2 in)
- Seat height: 810 mm (32 in)
- Weight: 184 kg (406 lb) (dry); Kerb: 210 kg (460 lb) (wet)
- Fuel capacity: 16 L (3.5 imp gal; 4.2 US gal)

At the Intermot 2016, Ducati announced a new Supersport, that would be available in Spring 2017. The bike uses the 937 cc Testastretta motor (from the Hypermotard 939), but the power arrives lower in the rev range, and final drive gear ratios are longer. The 2017 Supersport uses a trellis frame and some similarities in appearance to the Panigale, but configured as a "relaxed sport bike", with a much less radical riding position. The bike is available in two versions, standard and "S".

The "S" version features a digital quickshifter and fully adjustable Öhlins suspension at front and rear, but the quickshifter may be ordered for the standard bike. Optional packages includes a "Sport Pack" (carbon front fender, carbon tank cover, and bespoke brake reservoir covers) or a "Touring Pack" (semi-rigid panniers, a touring windscreen, and heated grips).

Records
Preceded by Kawasaki Z1	Fastest production motorcycle 1975–1976	Succeeded by Laverda Jota
