= Ducati Pantah =

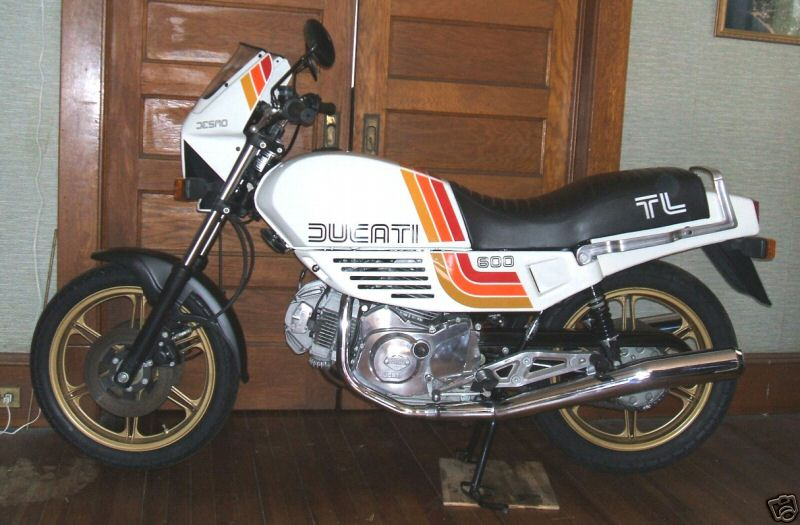
- Ducati Pantah 600TL
- Manufacturer: Ducati
- Also called: Ducati Pantah 600 TL
- Production: 1980–1986
- Successor: SuperSport
- Class: Sportbike
- Engine: 90° V-twin

The Ducati Pantah is an Italian motorcycle with a 90° V-twin engine, produced between 1980 and 1986.

Unlike its predecessors which were bevel-gear OHC designs, the Pantah was the first Ducati to have belt-driven camshaft motors, thus forming the vanguard of the new generation of current Ducati V-twins. First shown December 1979, the Pantah came on the market as the 1980 500SL and the last of the line, the 650SL, was sold in 1986. Successful in racing as the 600 cc TT2 and later TT1 750 cc racer, the Pantah was a lighter, shorter wheelbase motorcycle, in a new trellis frame that was to become a trademark Ducati feature.

== Pantah 500 cc ==
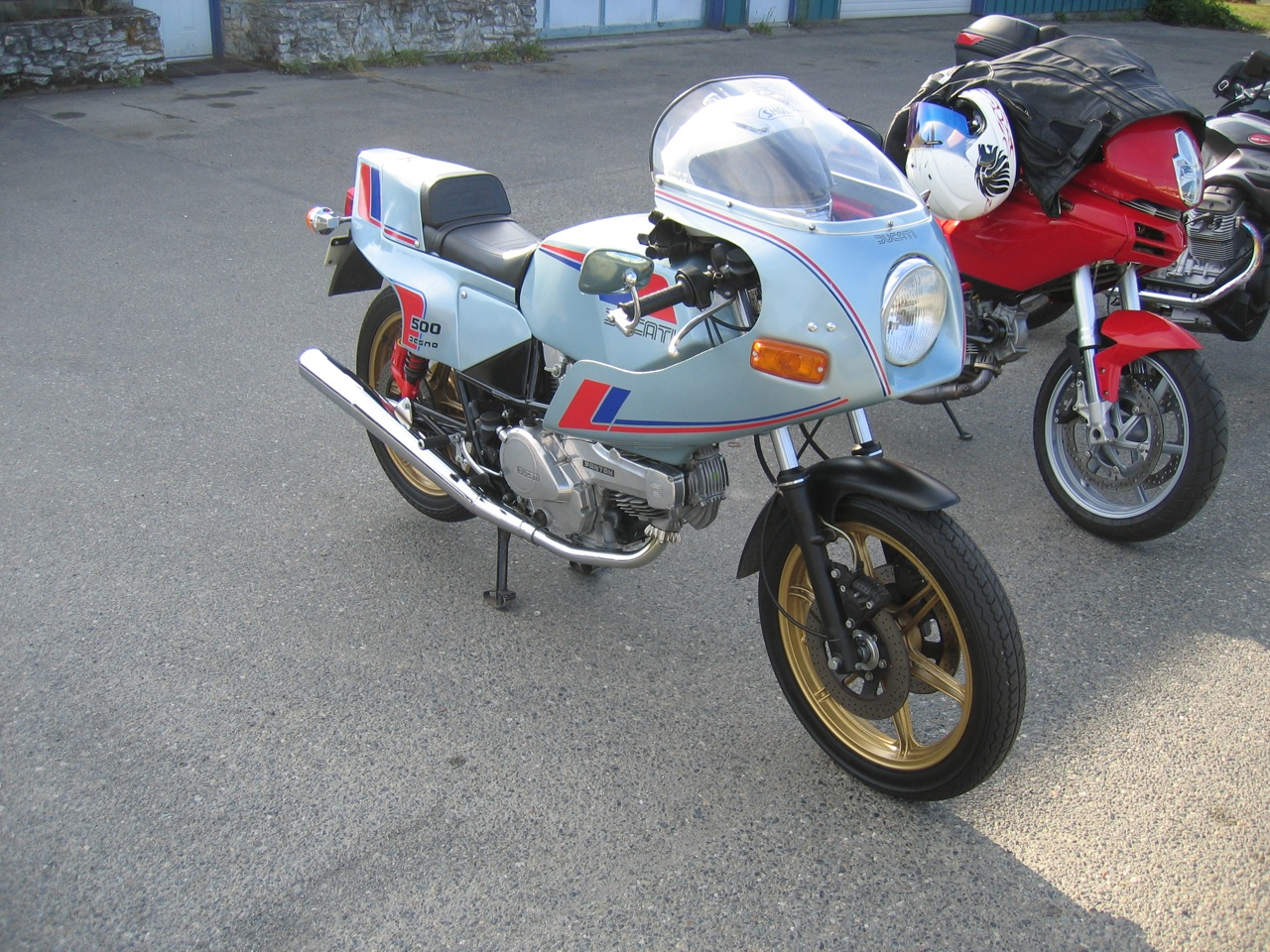
Early Pantah showing aluminum cambelt covers

When Ducati's 1976 350 cc and 500 cc parallel twins proved to be a marketing failure, Fabio Taglioni went to work developing a replacement. The Pantah 500 was developed from the last of the GP500 racers of 1973.

The Pantah was first shown at the Milan Bike Show in December 1979. The prototype was different to Ducati's earlier bikes: it had a trellis frame, with the suspended motor acting as a stressed member, and the swingarm pivoted on the rear of the crankcase. The single overhead camshaft was driven by toothed rubber belt and primary transmission was via Morse chain . The front disc brake was a Campagnolo Hydroconico. The Pantah's performance was impressive: 500 cc, 50 hp (36.5 kW) @ 8500 rpm, 180 kg, 1450 mm of wheelbase, significantly better from the earlier bevel-head V twins which were too long, bulky and stable for racing. The Pantah's performance easily surpassed that of the ill-conceived 1976 parallel twins.

The 1980 Pantah 500SL had a plain bearing crankshaft and the same bore and stroke as the old 500 racer, 74 mm x 58 mm, but the head had a 60 degree included valve angle. The engines were noticeably lacking in bottom-end and mid-range torque, but they revved freely enough. The suspension seemed less precise than earlier Ducati models, and the 35 mm front forks lacked rigidity. Some riders found the final gearing too tall, and the intake and exhaust restrictive; but when these were changed for higher flow items with lowered gearing, it gave a performance increase.

== Pantah 600SL, 600TL and TT2 racer ==
The 1981 600SL had a fairing and hydraulic clutch activation. It had an 80 mm bore and the 58 mm stroke giving 583 cc, whereas the first Pantah based racer, the 600 cc TT2 racer used 81 mm) The last of the 600SL bikes had MHR paint. The styling of the 1982 600TL proved unpopular, and the model lasted only until 1983.

== Pantah 650SL and TT1 750 racer ==
In 1983 the 650SL was produced to homologate the TT1 750 racer's 61.5 mm stroke. Instead of producing a production 750, the 650SL was born with 82 mm bore and the required 61.5 mm stroke. bodywork is virtually identical to the 600 but was painted red and yellow, had a different instrument layout and some other minor changes, but it had more torque, and that was a big improvement and was considered by many as THE Pantah. The 650SL produced 63 hp at 8,500 rpm.

== Cagiva takeover ==
Cagiva took over Ducati Meccanica in 1985, and Ducati engines promptly appeared in Cagiva-badged motorcycles. The 650SL continued to be produced after the Cagiva take-over, and ended production in 1986. The Cagiva Alazzurra was a revamped Ducati Pantah.

== See also ==
- Ducati Bipantah
- Ducati Air-cooled V Twins (1970 on)
