= Ceccato motorcycles =

Italian motorcycle manufacturer

Ceccato
- Company type: Private
- Industry: Manufacturing
- Founded: 1938; 88 years ago, Montecchio Maggiore, Vicenza
- Founder: Pietro Ceccato
- Headquarters: Montecchio Maggiore, Italy
- Area served: Worldwide
- Key people: Pietro Ceccato, Fabio Taglioni
- Products: Motorcycles, bicycles, compressors, gas cylinders, service station equipment
- Number of employees: 600

Ceccato was an Italian motorcycle manufacturer founded in 1938 by a former pharmacist, Pietro Ceccato, who was passionate about both engines and innovative management ideas, such as making process changes using input invited from employees. For the motorcycle Giro d'Italia and other races, Ceccato built the first of Fabio Taglioni's engines to be realized, a 75 cc OHC single designed with the help of Taglioni's Technical Institute students. The company was active in motorcycles until the 1960s. It however successfully continued producing compressors and grew over the years. Today Ceccato is an important player on the global compressed air market.

== See also ==
- List of Italian companies
- List of motorcycle manufacturers
