= Ducati Apollo =

Ducati Berliner 1260 Apollo
- Manufacturer: Ducati
- Production: 1964 (2 units)
- Engine: 1,257 cc (76.7 cu in) air-cooled OHV 90° v-four
- Bore / stroke: 84.5 mm × 56 mm (3.33 in × 2.20 in)
- Wheelbase: 1,554.48 mm (61.200 in)
- Dimensions: W: Engine 450 mm (18 in); Handlebars 750 mm (30 in)
- Seat height: 749.3 mm (29.50 in)
- Weight: 270 kg (600 lb) (dry)

The 1964 Ducati Berliner 1260 Apollo was a prototype 1,257 cc (76.7 cu in) V4 engine motorcycle producing 100 bhp (75 kW) and capable of over 120 mph (190 km/h). It was never put into production, but did influence other production Ducatis that followed. Both Ducati and their United States distributor, Berliner Motor Corporation, were experiencing declining sales of existing small-capacity single-cylinder models, and sought to create a bike to compete with Harley-Davidson. Berliner Motor was keen to have a model that could win lucrative police motorcycle supply contracts, and that could also sell as a civilian touring bike.

== Concept ==
In 1959, the Berliner Motor Corporation approached Ducati about creating a rival to the Harley-Davidson to sell to police departments around the US. Author Greg Field, based on interviews with Mike Berliner, contends that Berliner went so far as to ship two Harley-Davidsons to Italy as examples (one was for Moto Guzzi), and that Ducati, rather than any Japanese company, was the first Harley-Davidson imitator.

The Berliner brothers were enthusiastic. Ducati's government management was not. It was only when Berliner agreed to underwrite a portion of the development costs in 1961, that the project went ahead. They decided to call it the Apollo, in honor of the Moon mission series of the time.

Ducati was to produce two prototypes and two extra engines as spares. Today only one survives.

== Mechanicals ==
Fabio Taglioni was to develop a bike that conformed to US police specifications, and was bigger than any current model Harley-Davidson. Taglioni decided on an air-cooled 1257 cc 90° two-valve head V4 using a 180-degree crankshaft with roller bearing big ends. That crankshaft fitted into a horizontally split wet sump crankcase with a center main bearing support. The bore was 84.5 mm, and the stroke 56 mm. Valve actuation was by pushrods and rocker arms.

The engine was a stressed member of the heavy duty open cradle frame with a central box section front downtube between the forward cylinders. A small car-sized starter motor and generator were fitted. It had a five-speed transmission, at a time when most motorcycles had four. Ceriani developed the suspension package, but riders today would be alarmed by the inadequate front and rear single leading shoe 8.675 in (220.3 mm) drum brakes. The stopping distance was huge, and had to be allowed for. It had a 61.2 in (1,550 mm) wheelbase, and weighed 596 lb (270 kg) dry. Taglioni dismissed the Berliners' suggestion of shaft drive, and chose chain final drive. The police specification stipulated 16-inch tyres, so there was little choice in that.

== Performance ==
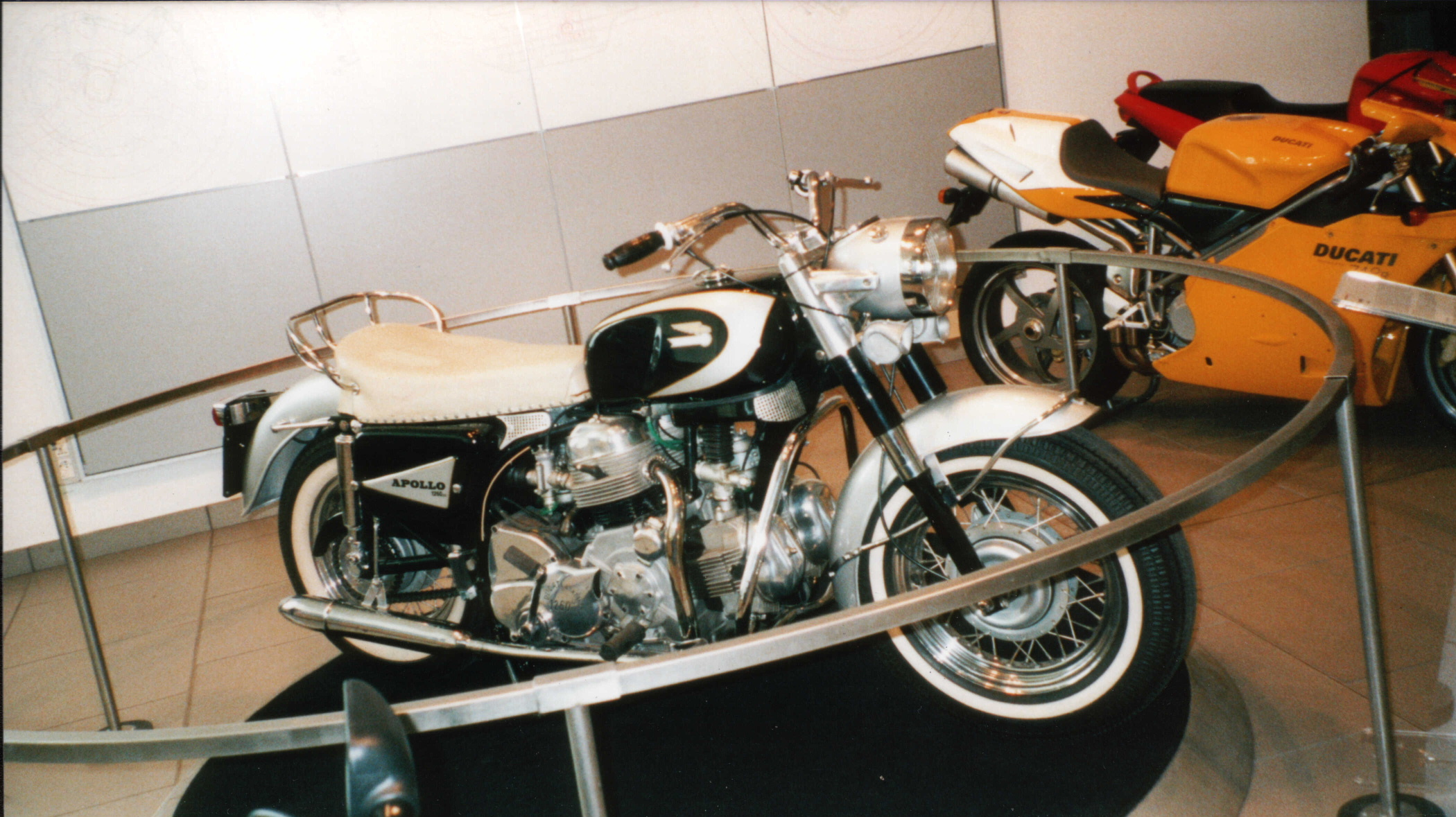
The Ducati Apollo at the Ducati Museum

Initially it was putting out 100 bhp (75 kW) @ 7000 rpm, and could exceed 120 mph (190 km/h). The Harley of the time made 55 bhp. The first test rider Franco Farne came back from his first ride, and said it “handles like a truck.” Farne normally rode small racers. It soon became evident that even specially made tyres were not up to the power of the engine. A tyre disintegrated at speed on the Autostrada, and the test rider rated his survival “a miracle”. The engine was detuned to give 80 bhp (60 kW). Tyres continued to disintegrate. The engine was brought down to 65 bhp (48 kW), and the survival rate of the tyres became acceptable. This was late 1963. In comparison, in 1958 Moto Guzzi had used a 20-inch rear tyre on the Grand Prix 500 cc V8, and they had worn rapidly with 78 bhp (58 kW)

In March 1964 a gold-painted prototype was handed over in a formal ceremony.

The reduction in power meant that the Apollo could now be outperformed by the British and BMW twins, which restricted the anticipated market to police forces. Berliner was printing advertising, demonstrating the prototype to Police Chiefs, and genuinely preparing to market the Apollo.

=== Berliner specification sheet ===
This is from a promotional flyer distributed by Berliner Motor Corporation, which also included a front three quarter black and white view of the gold bike. The US$1,500 selling price would be US$10,248 in 2008 dollars.

Specifications of the D/B V/4 - an exclusive project of DUCATI – BERLINER

- SPORT ENGINE - 4 Cylinder 1260 cc, Bore x Stroke 84.5 x 56 mm
- Carburetors 4 (SS 1 32 mm) - Compression Ratio 10:1 - Approx. 100 HP @ 7000 RPM
- (Optional) Carburetors 2 (SS 1 24 mm) - Compression Ratio 8:1 - Approx. 80 HP @ 6000 RPM
- Gearbox built in unit with the engine
- Electric starter and kick starter
- Five (5) speed, positive shift
- Oil sump capacity 3.5 quarts
- 12 volt electrical system, 32 amp battery
- Alternator 200 Watt, Starter engine: 0.50 kW
- Wheelbase 1550 mm
- Interchangeable and quickly detachable front and rear wheel
- Front tire: Ribbed 5.00 X 16 inch Rear tire: Block tread 5.00 x 16 inch
- Large full hub front and rear brakes
- Rubber cushioned rear sprocket
- "Roll on" center stand and side stand
- Comfortable dual seat with sturdy Chrome plated hand rail.
- Width; Engine 450 mm Handlebar 750 mm Ground clearance 170 mm
- Chain 5/8 x 3/8 primary chain duplex,
- Weight approx. 240 kg

The first production series will be manufactured early in 1965 for the European and other foreign markets. Shipments

scheduled for the United States are planned for the second half of 1965. The price in the USA will be approximately $1500.

— Berliner Motor Corporation

== Project end ==
The Apollo appeared at the Earls Court, London motorcycle show in November, 1964. UK magazine Motor Cycle confirmed the massive 1,260 cc four-cylinder engine of the Apollo attracted plenty of attention on the Ducati stand, and further carried a quip allegedly heard between two visitors: "I wonder if I could get that lot into a Norton Featherbed frame?".

The Italian government decided that the limited market did not justify the tooling costs of production, and withdrew project funding. This was a severe blow to Berliner's business plans.

It could have been a superbike before its time, but tire technology was not ready. There were other bikes developed as a result: the 1970 500 cc GP bikes and 750 cc production 90-degree V-twins.

The second prototype, a black and silver sports version with four Dell'Orto SS 1 carburettors, survived, and was on display at Ducati's factory museum in Bologna, courtesy of its owner, Hiroaki Iwashita, from 2002 to 2003, but now resides in his museum in Yufuin on the island of Kyushu.

The machine's sole public appearance in recent decades was at the 2002 Goodwood Festival of Speed, where it was display-ridden up the test hillclimb by motorcycling journalist Ian Kerr. It had previously been substantially overhauled at the Ducati works in Italy by two ex-race mechanics.

The fate of the first gold painted prototype was unknown until a recent YouTube video published in June 19 2025 revealed that a Japanese collector owns it.

== Sequel ==
The Berliner brothers' quest for an offering in the police fleet and big touring cruiser market did not end with the Apollo. As the Apollo project was wrapping up, Joe Berliner saw the Moto Guzzi V7 for the first time, a prototype to be entered in a contest, set to begin in 1966, by the Italian Ministry of Internal Affairs to select a replacement for their outmoded military and police fleet. Berliner Motor Corporation and Moto Guzzi would find success selling the V7's production variants, the Ambassador and Eldorado, to the LAPD, CHP, and other agencies, as well as civilian touring riders.
