= Ducati 750 GT =

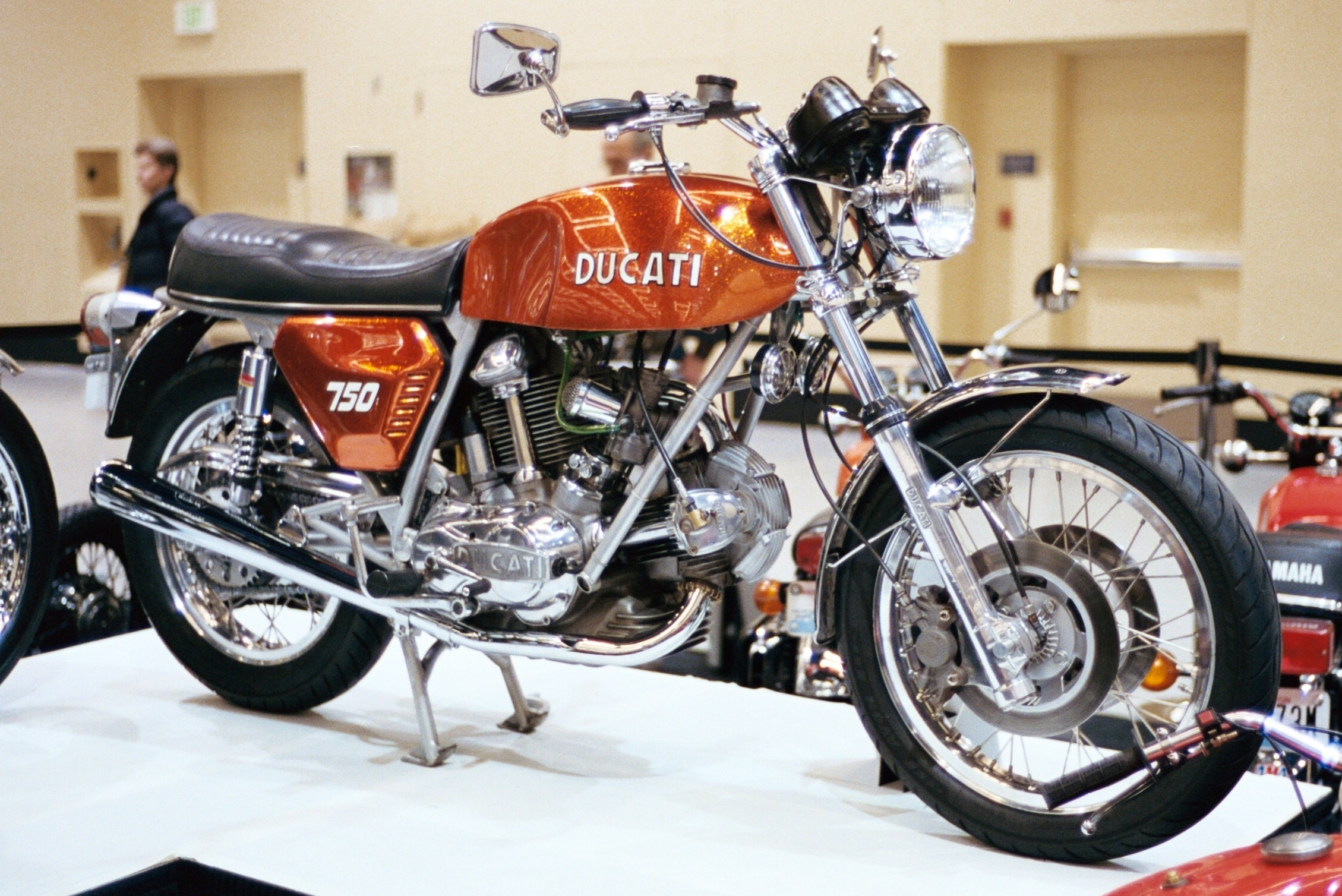
- Manufacturer: Ducati
- Production: 1971–1974
- Class: Standard
- Engine: 748 cc (45.6 cu in) air-cooled 90° V-twin
- Bore / stroke: 80.0 mm × 74.4 mm (3.15 in × 2.93 in)
- Compression ratio: 8.5:1
- Top speed: 200 km/h
- Power: 37.3 kW (50.0 hp) @ 5,250 rpm
- Transmission: 5 speed
- Suspension: Front: hydraulic telescoping forks Rear: swing arm with adjustable hydraulic shocks
- Brakes: Front: 280 mm disc Rear: drum
- Wheelbase: 1,500 mm (59 in)
- Dimensions: L: 2,250 mm (89 in); W: 760 mm (30 in)
- Seat height: 800 mm (31 in)
- Weight: 185 kg (408 lb) (dry)
- Fuel capacity: 17 L (3.7 imp gal; 4.5 US gal)

The Ducati 750 GT is a motorcycle produced by Ducati from 1971 to 1974. Additionally there were 40 1978 750GTs manufactured. Total production of the 750GT over all years of manufacture was 4,133. Designed by Fabio Taglioni, the motorcycle was the first Ducati to have a 90° V-twin engine configuration, which became a signature feature in the Ducati bikes that followed.

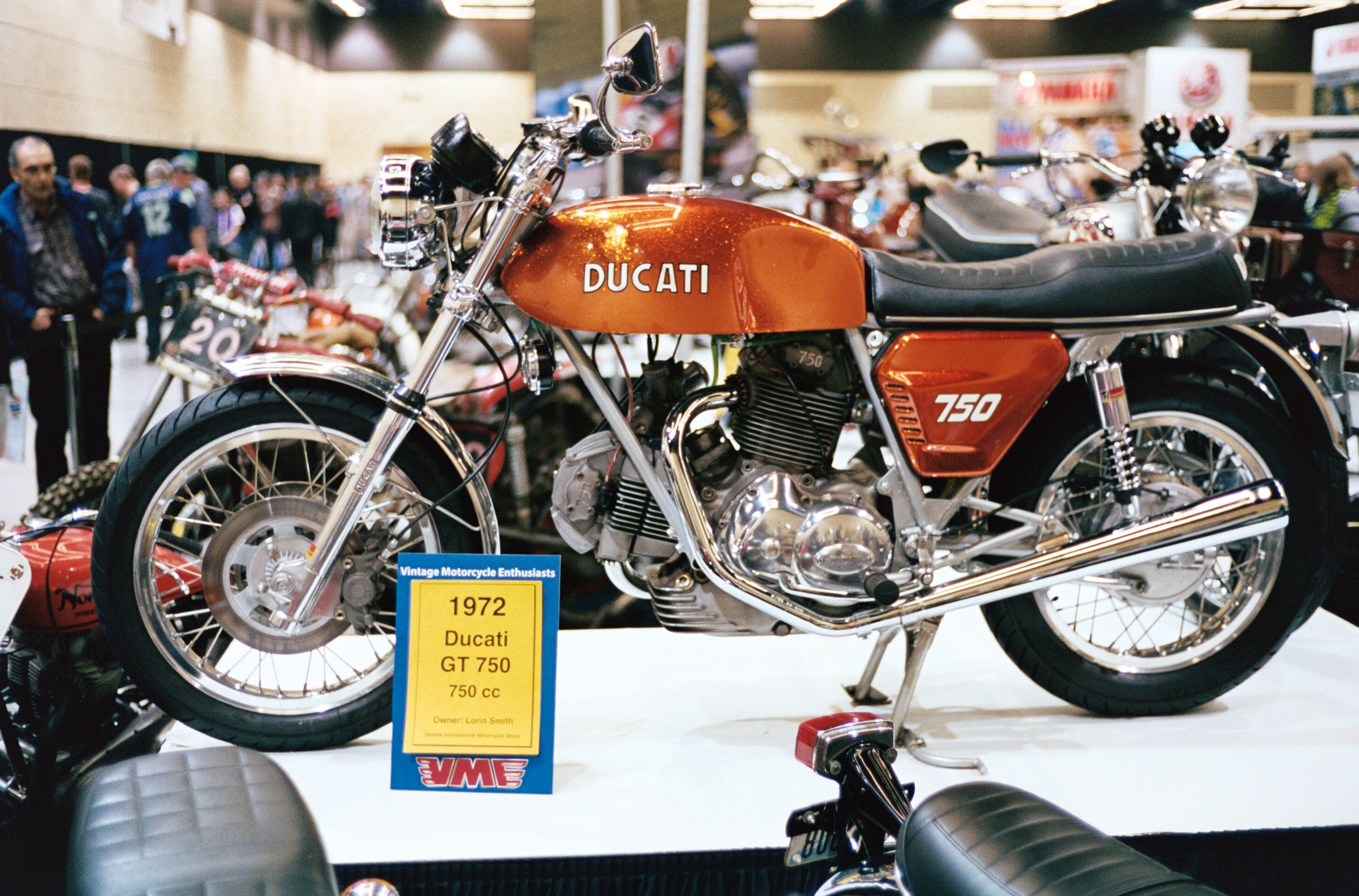
left 1972 Ducati 750 GT from a Vintage Motorcycle Enthusiasts collector at the Seattle International Motorcycle Show.
