= Paul Smart =

Paul Smart may refer to:

- Paul Smart (motorcyclist) (1943–2021), English former motorcycle Grand Prix road racer
  - Ducati PaulSmart 1000 LE, a motorcycle named after the racer
- Paul Smart (sailor) (1892–1979), American sailor and Olympic champion
