= Ducati SportClassic =

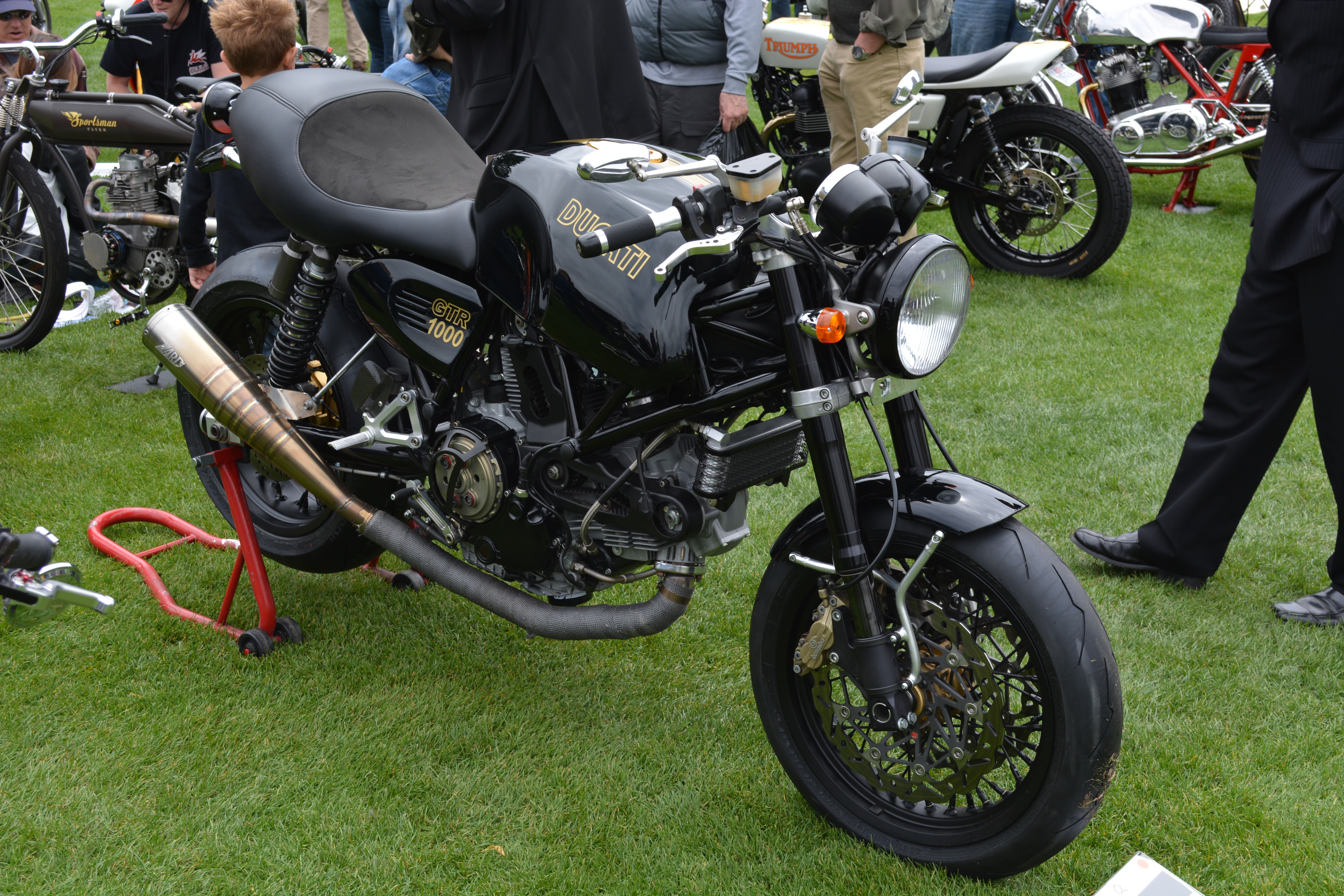
- Manufacturer: Ducati Motor Holding S.p.A.
- Also called: Sport1000, GT1000, Paul Smart 1000
- Production: 2006–2010
- Predecessor: MH900e
- Class: standard
- Engine: 992 cc (60.5 in^{3}) 90° V-twin 94 ∅ x 71.5 mm, Compression Ratio 10:1
- Top speed: 217 km/h (135 mph)
- Power: 68 kW (91 bhp) @ 8,000 rpm
- Torque: 9.3 kgf⋅m (67 lbf⋅ft) @ 6,000 rpm
- Transmission: Gearbox 6 speed, Ratios 1st 37/15, 2nd 30/17, 3rd 27/20, 4th 24/22, 5th 23/24, 6th 24/28, Primary drive Straight cut gears; ratio 1.84, Final drive Chain; Front sprocket 15; Rear sprocket 38
- Suspension: Front: 43 mm upside-down telescopic fork (Sport1000, GT1000), Öhlins 43 mm upside-down fully adjustable fork(PS1000) Rear: Sachs fully adjustable monoshock absorber on the left side (Sport1000), Twin shock absorbers (GT1000), Öhlins fully adjustable monoshock absorber on the left side(PS1000)
- Brakes: Front 2 x 320 mm semi-floating discs, floating caliper 2-piston, 2 sintered-pad caliper (Sport1000, PS1000), 2 x 320 mm semi-floating discs, floating caliper 2-piston, 2-pad caliper (GT1000). Rear brake 245 mm disc, 1-piston floating caliper
- Tires: Front 120/70 R 17. Rear 180/55 R 17
- Rake, trail: 24°, 92 mm (3.6 in)
- Wheelbase: 1,425 mm (56.1 in) except 2006 Sport1000 and Paul Smart, 1,462 mm (57.6 in)
- Dimensions: L: 2,100 mm (83 in); W: 710 mm (28 in); H: 1,030 mm (41 in)
- Seat height: 825 mm (32.5 in) (Sport1000, PS1000), 810 mm (32 in) (GT1000)
- Weight: 179 kg (395 lb) (Sport1000), 183 kg (403 lb) (GT1000), 181 kg (399 lb) (PS1000) (dry)
- Fuel capacity: 15 L (3.3 imp gal; 4.0 US gal) (includes 3.5 L (0.77 imp gal; 0.92 US gal) reserve)

The Ducati SportClassics are a range of retro styled motorcycles introduced by Ducati at the 2003 Tokyo Motor Show, and put on sale in 2005 for the 2006 model year. The Paul Smart version was made for the 2006 model year only, while the Sport1000 ran from 2006 through the 2009 model years, and the GT1000 ran from the 2007 through 2010 model years.

They were the product of Ducati's design chief Pierre Terblanche, who said the series started with the Evoluzione MH900e replica of Mike Hailwood's victorious 1978 Isle of Man TT bike. The different variations are based on similar frames, and powered by the Desmodue 992 cc (60.5 in^{3}) air-cooled 90° V-twin Ducati 1000 Dual Spark engine, also called the DS9 engine.

== 2006–2009 Sport1000 ==
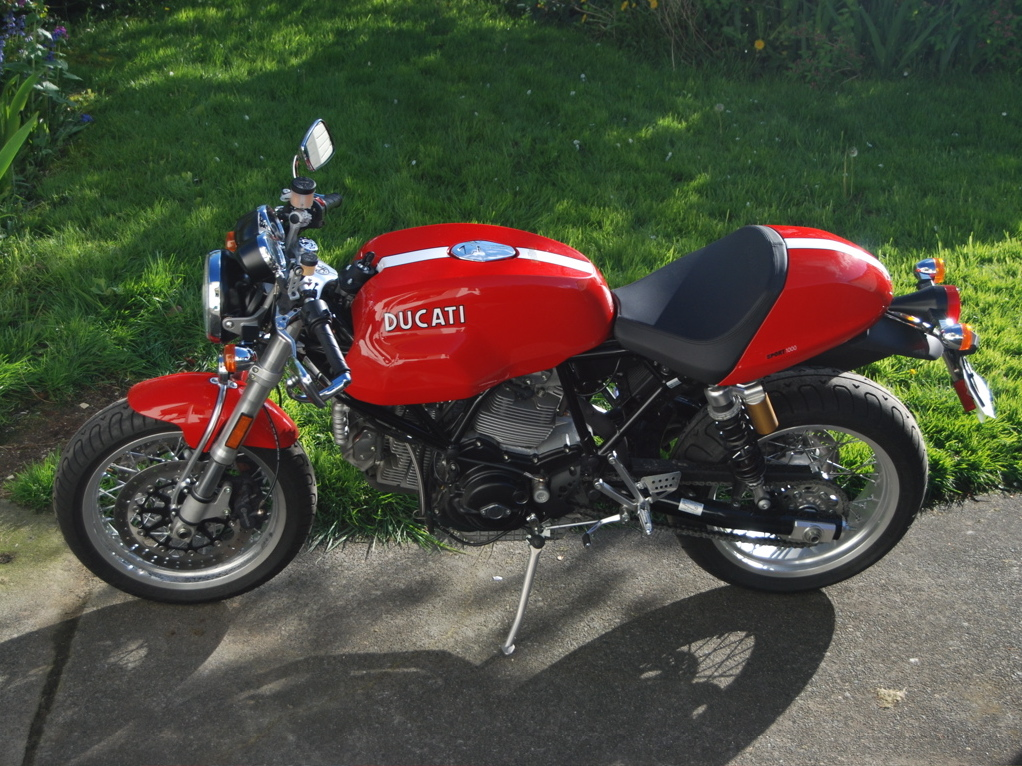
2006 Ducati Sport1000

The Sport1000 took its inspiration from the 1973 Ducati 750 Sport and related 750 Imola Desmo, and had the look of a classic lightweight single-seat cafe racer. It used a two valve 1000DS motor with a 1,425 mm (56.1 in) wheelbase, trellis tube frame. The suspension used three way adjustable single Sachs rear shocks, and non-adjustable 43 mm Marzocchi front forks. The wheels were wire spoke large section alloy rims with tubed Pirelli Phantom tyres. Borrani were approached to supply the rims, but could not supply the volume, so Excel rims were used. The Sport1000 was available in black with a white stripe, red with a white stripe, or amber with a black stripe.

The 2006 model, known as the monoposto (single seat) had a well gusseted 60 mm section asymmetric swingarm and a single shock, with stacked mufflers on the right side, low clip-on handlebars, and a dry-clutch. In 2007, a variation was made to taller clip-on handlebars, a wet-clutch, and the GT1000's dual-shock swingarm with mufflers on both sides. This change created space for passenger footpegs and a removable rear seat cowl covering a pillion seat was added, prompting the name change to Sport1000 biposto (twin seat).

In 2007, a Sport1000SE was also produced in a limited run of 100, available only in the US, which used the configuration of the 2006 model and a black and gold paint scheme reminiscent of the square-case 1980 Ducati 900SS. This paint scheme was inspired by a custom scheme done to a 2006 model by a US dealer.

== 2007–2009 Sport1000S ==
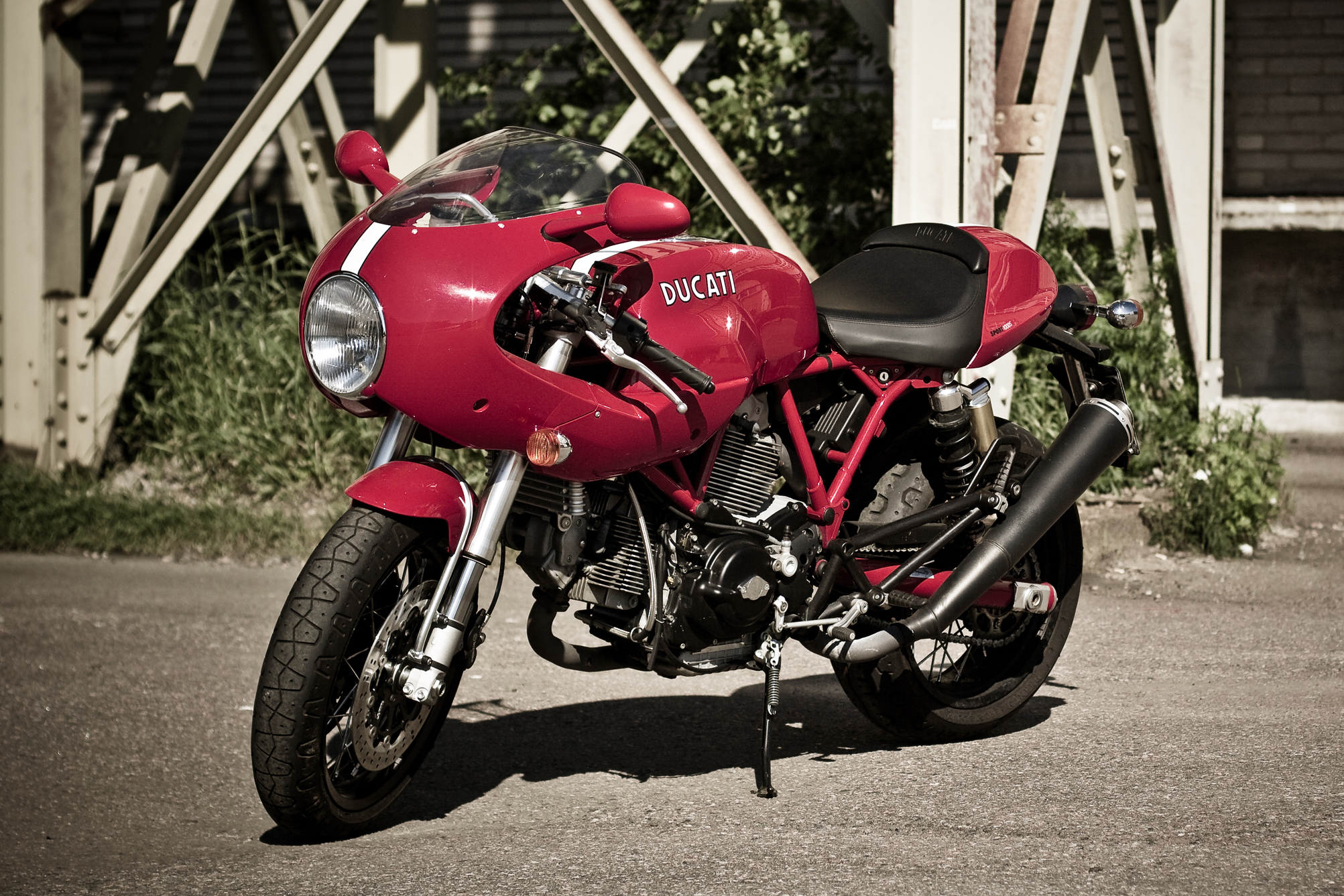
Ducati Sport 1000S

The 2007 Ducati Sport1000S had the front suspension of the Sport1000, while adding a retro styled fairing like the Paul Smart. The model could be equipped with Ducati original accessory lower fairings to create a late 1960s or early 1970s race bike look. The 1000S followed the Sport1000's change to a dual-shock swing arm and wet clutch, though lower handlebars were required to fit under the fairing. 2007-2008 Monoposto models were available only in red with a white stripe, while in 2008 the paint scheme was changed to black with a white stripe for the Biposto model. The Ducati Sport Classic 1000 Biposto model was also very similar. The bike came in two styles. ""Monoposto"" or ""Biposto"" with the main difference being the "monoposto" is a one-seater and the "biposto" being a two-seater, hence the "mono" and "Bi" connotations. Here are some of the numbers gained from Ducati themselves of how many Bipostos were produced: 2007 model year there were black 240 total/ 69 USA, red 253 total/60 USA, yellow 204 total/109 USA, 2008 black 84 total/ 52 USA, red 14 total/ o USA, yellow 0 total/ 0 USA, total for 2007 697 / 238 USA, 2008 98 / 52 USA. Despite there being so few variants made, they were not number tagged (example (1/300, as many limited run motorcycles are) as their low amounts made were not from Ducati themselves limiting the amounts made like the Paul Smart Model, but rather they were not popular at the time to the public, so low demand caused low production numbers. In 2010 Disney released the film Tron Legacy that featured a black 2008 Ducati Sport Classic 1000 Biposto, so the bike gained popularity, but the production of the motorcycles had already been ceased, so the rarity grew from that point on as a valuable collector's item for the sport classic line as a whole.

== 2006 Paul Smart Limited Edition ==
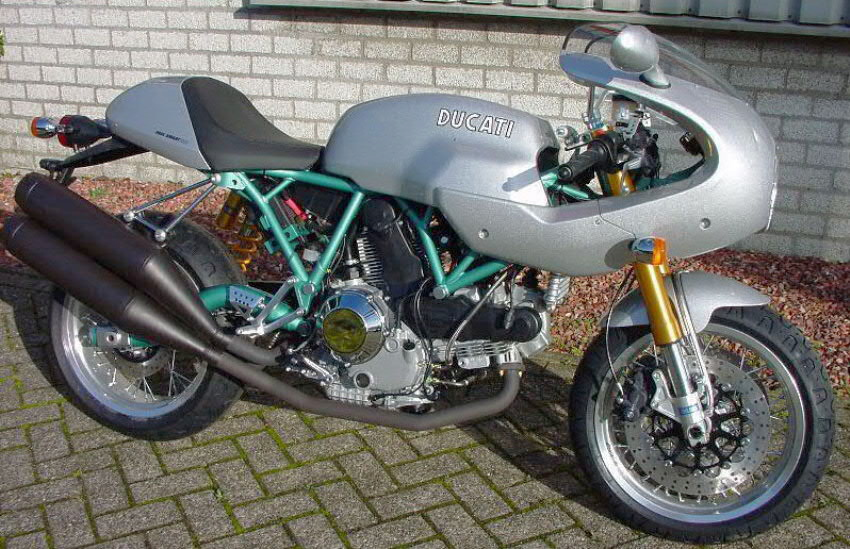
2006 Ducati Paul Smart 1000LE

Paul Smart rode the 750 Imola Desmo competition bike to victory in 1972, and the 1974 750 SuperSport was based on that, tank and sidepanels painted silver, fairing painted green and silver with a green frame. The Giugiaro case 900 and 750 SuperSports had the blue and silver paint. The inspiration for Paul Smart LE is based on these bikes. It has multi adjustable Öhlins suspension front and rear, the fairing, steering damper, and a green frame to go with the silver and blue paint on the tank, lower clip-ons, fairing, and side covers. The Paul Smart was limited to 2000 examples worldwide

== 2007–2010 GT1000 ==
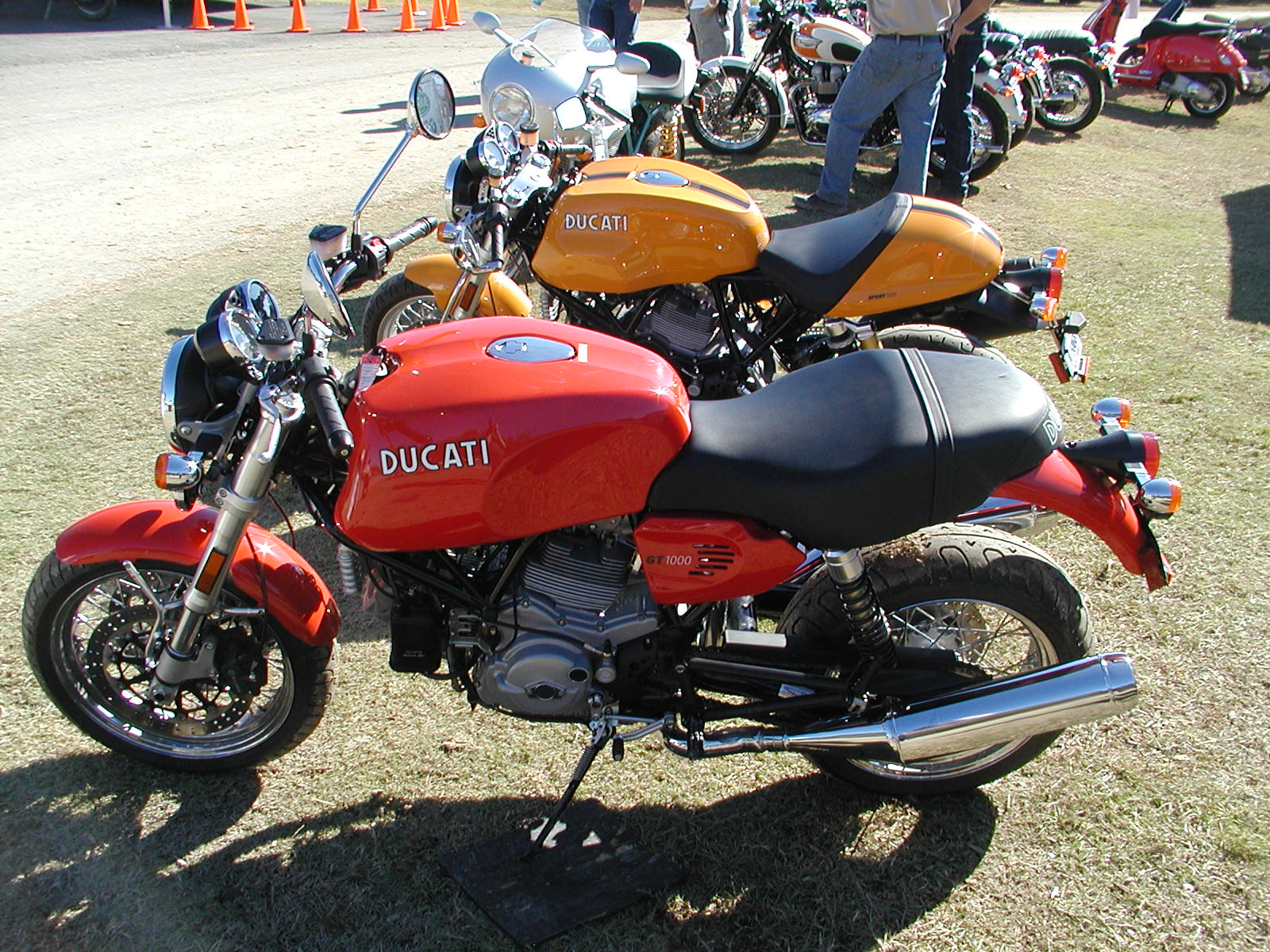
A red Ducati GT1000. A yellow Sport1000 is in the background, with a silver Paul Smart visible further back.

The Ducati GT1000 used a similar steel tubular trellis frame to the Paul Smart and the Sport1000, and the same Desmodue 992 cc (60.5 in^{3}) engine. It was designed with comfort in mind and intended for sport-touring riders. The frame differed from the Sport1000 in the addition of mounting points for twin shocks and side panels. The GT1000 had touring handlebars, mounted on the same front forks as the Sport has clip-ons: non-adjustable 43 mm Marzocchi upside-down forks.

While the rear end had the seventies appearance, the components were more modern. The rear suspension used twin Sachs shocks, adjustable for spring pre-load, mounted on a beefy 60 mm section swingarm. Wide Excel 17 inch chromed steel (36 spoke) rims are laced with thick 4.4 mm spokes to silver painted aluminum alloy hubs, necessitating the use of tube-type tires.

The front brakes of the GT1000 were derived from the other SportClassic models, and had two Brembo floating calipers with 30 and 32 mm diameter thermally insulated pistons. They were semi-floating discs with a diameter of 320 mm and a thickness of 4 mm. The rear brake system consisted of a floating single piston Brembo 34 mm caliper with high friction sintered pads and a 245 mm disc (bigger rear disc for two-up riders).

It had twin exhausts and silencers, and pillion pegs where they belong for riding any distance. The silencers (exhausts) have more of a "Silentium" look and were not designed to resemble the original 'reverse cone' "Conti" silencers that were present on the original 1970s Ducatis that inspired the GT1000.

The GT 1000 Touring was a special edition model with chrome fenders, a small chrome luggage rack, a higher handlebar and a windscreen.
