= Ducati PaulSmart 1000 LE =

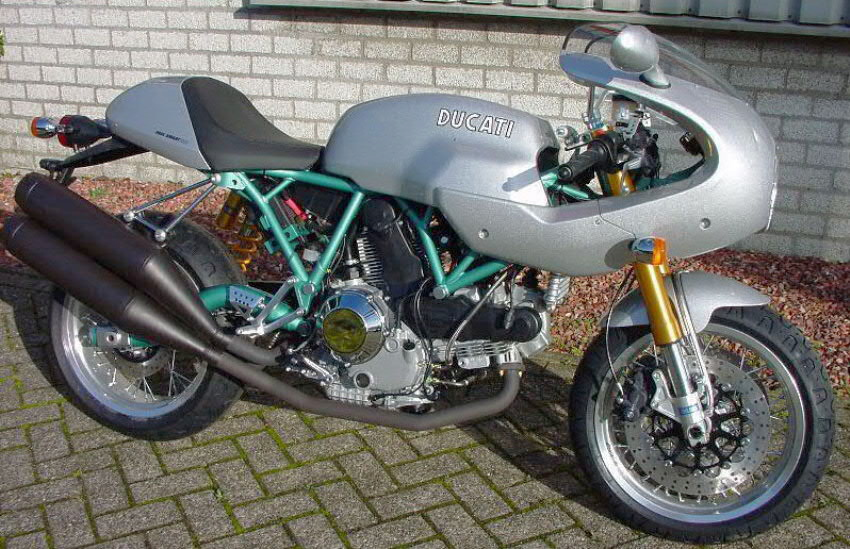
- Manufacturer: Ducati
- Also called: PS1000LE
- Production: 2006
- Engine: 992 cc (60.5 cu in) air-cooled, desmodromic 2-valve 90° V-twin
- Power: 69 kW (92 hp) @ 8000 rpm (claimed)
- Torque: 91.2 N⋅m (67.3 lb⋅ft) @ 6000 rpm (claimed)
- Transmission: 6-speed
- Frame type: Steel trellis
- Wheelbase: 1,425 mm (56.1 in)
- Weight: 181 kg (399 lb) (claimed) (dry)
- Fuel capacity: 15 L (4.0 US gal)
- Related: SportClassic series

The Ducati PaulSmart 1000 LE (PS1000LE) is a retro styled motorcycle built by Ducati in 2006 to commemorate Paul Smart's win at the Imola 200 race in 1972, a win that helped define Ducati's future approach to racing. The bike is styled in the fashion of the Ducati 750 Imola Desmo race bike that Paul Smart rode to victory, and the 1974 750 SuperSport it originally inspired. It is one of the SportClassic series designed by Pierre Terblanche.

== Styling ==
The bike is styled to look like a race bike from the 1970s, the rounded bubble style half fairing and café racer tail section are very reminiscent of the race winning 750 Imola Desmo. A green finished frame, outboard dampers and wire spoked rims with special Pirelli Phantom tires (featuring a retro tread pattern made exclusively for the PS1000LE) complete the look.

== Specifications ==
The PS1000LE is powered by a 992 cc (60.5 cu in) 90° V-twin cylinder, 2-valves per cylinder desmodromic, air-cooled engine with Marelli injectors on a 45 mm (1.8 in) throttle body connected to a 6-speed transmission. Ducati claimed the power output was 69 kW (92 hp) at 8.000 rpm and claimed torque was at 91.2 N⋅m (67.3 lb⋅ft) at 6.000 rpm. Exhaust gasses are directed to twin mufflers mounted high on the right side of the rear wheel.

The chassis consists of a tubular steel trellis. For the suspension, an Öhlins 43 mm upside-down fully adjustable fork is used for the front while a fully adjustable monoshock also from Ohlins is mounted on the left side of the rear wheel. Total wheelbase is 1,420 mm (56.1 in).

Fuel tank capacity is 15 L; 3.2 imp gal (3.9 US gal) which includes the 3.8 L; 0.83 imp gal (1 US gal) reserve. The claimed dry weight was 181 kg (399 lb) .

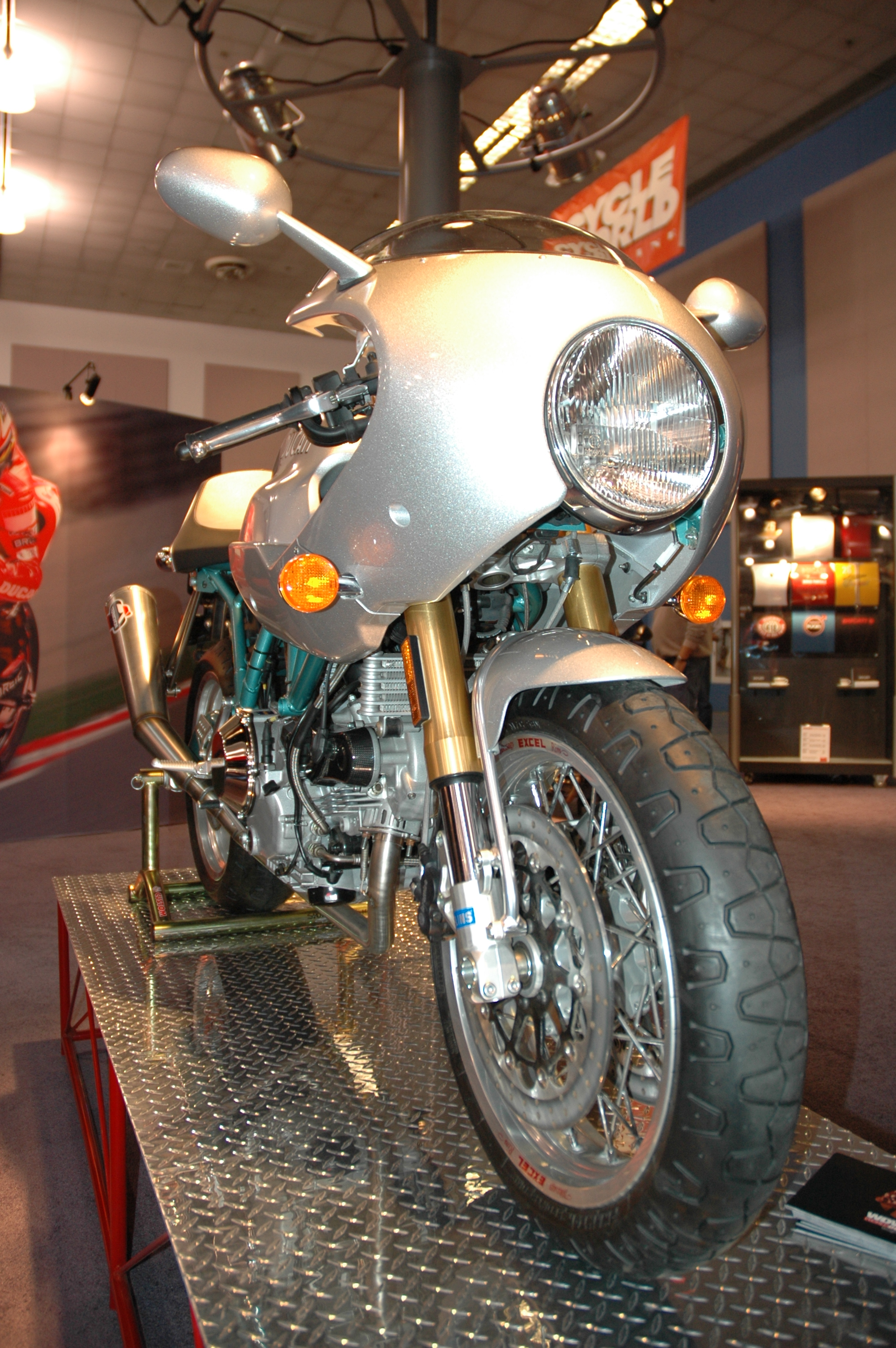
