= Ducati MH900e =

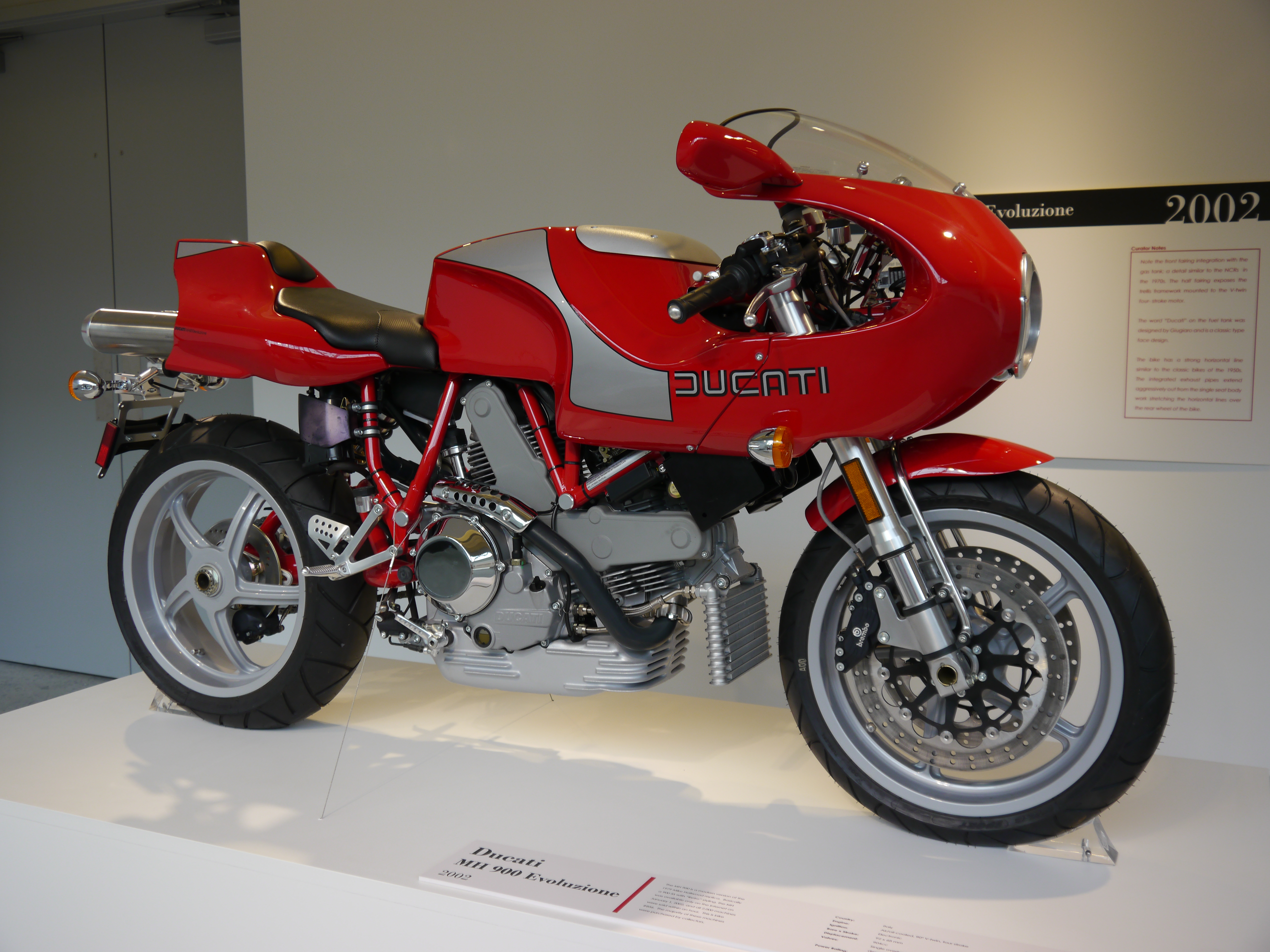
- Ducati MHe
- Manufacturer: Ducati Motor Holding S.p.A.
- Also called: MH900 Evoluzione
- Production: 2001–2002 (2,000 units)
- Predecessor: 1984 Ducati 900 MHR
- Successor: SportClassic
- Class: Sport bike, standard
- Engine: Air-cooled desmodromic 2-valve OHC 904 cc (55.2 in^{3}) 90° V-twin
- Bore / stroke: 92 mm × 68 mm (3.6 in × 2.7 in)
- Compression ratio: 9.2:1
- Power: 55 kW (74 hp) @ 8,000 rpm (claimed)
- Torque: 7.8 kgf⋅m (76 N⋅m; 56 lbf⋅ft) @ 6,500 rpm (claimed)
- Transmission: 6 speed, chain drive
- Suspension: Front: 43 mm upside-down telescopic fork Rear: Sachs fully adjustable mono-shock with aluminum swing-arm
- Brakes: Front 2 x 320 mm semi-floating discs, 4-piston caliper 2 Rear brake 220 mm disc, 2-piston floating caliper
- Tires: Front 120/65 ZR17. Rear 170/60 ZR17
- Rake, trail: 23.5°, 92 mm (3.6 in)
- Wheelbase: 1,415 mm (55.7 in)
- Seat height: 825 mm (32.5 in)
- Weight: 186 kg (410 lb) (claimed) (dry)
- Fuel capacity: 8.5 L (1.9 imp gal; 2.2 US gal)

The Ducati MH900e (or Evoluzione) is a retro sport motorcycle made by Ducati in 2001 and 2002, in a limited production run of 2,000 units. It was designed by Pierre Terblanche as an homage to Mike Hailwood's 1978 racing motorcycle. In 1984 Ducati had made the 900 MHR street bike, also an homage to Hailwood's 1978 bike.

== Concept ==
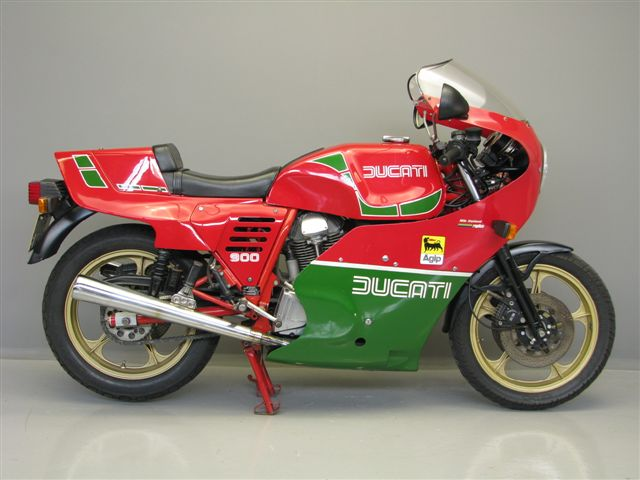
1984 Ducati 900 MHR, or Mike Hailwood Replica

The motorcycle's concept by the Ducati designer Pierre Terblanche was a homage to the racing motorcycle Mike Hailwood rode to win the 1978 Isle of Man TT. The MH in MH900e is Hailwood's initials, and the e suffix is for evoluzione in Italian, evolution in English.

In September 1998, the sketch was presented to the general public at the Intermot Show in Munich. Ducati decided to post a questionnaire on their website to test the interest of the MH900e fans. Federico Minoli and Massimo Bordi (General Manager of Ducati) produced a limited run of two thousand hand-built bikes. The first one thousand bikes would be produced in 2000 and the second thousand would be produced in 2001.

Ducati made the decision to sell the new bike directly to the consumer exclusively via the Internet.

The Ducati website opened for orders on January 1, 2000, at 00:01am GMT at a price of Euro15,000. The first 1,000 units were sold out in 31 minutes. The remaining bikes were sold over the next few weeks. Individuals made purchases from 20 countries. The estimated breakdown of the sales was 30% from Europe, 30% from the US and 39% from Japan.

== Production ==
The production of the MH900e was originally going to be sourced out to Bimota with production beginning the summer of 2000, but the collapse of the small company resulted in Ducati keeping the production in-house. The bike would be hand-built in a corner of the Bologna Factory at a rate of 4-5 bikes per day. Due to the unexpected changes, there was a late start in production with the first bike being produced one-year after its introduction in December 2000. Production continued into 2002 resulting in two different production years associated with the VINs (2001 and 2002).

== Suit over Hailwood name ==
In 2001 Pauline Hailwood, Mike Hailwood's widowed wife, sued Ducati for using her late husband's name in connection with Ducati's MH900e. Mike Hailwood never rode the MH900e and Ducati defended that the motorcycle was "inspired by the Ducati motorcycle that Mike Hailwood rode at the Isle of Man TT race in 1978". The case was settled with a retroactive license.
