= Ducati Multistrada =

Series of touring motorcycles

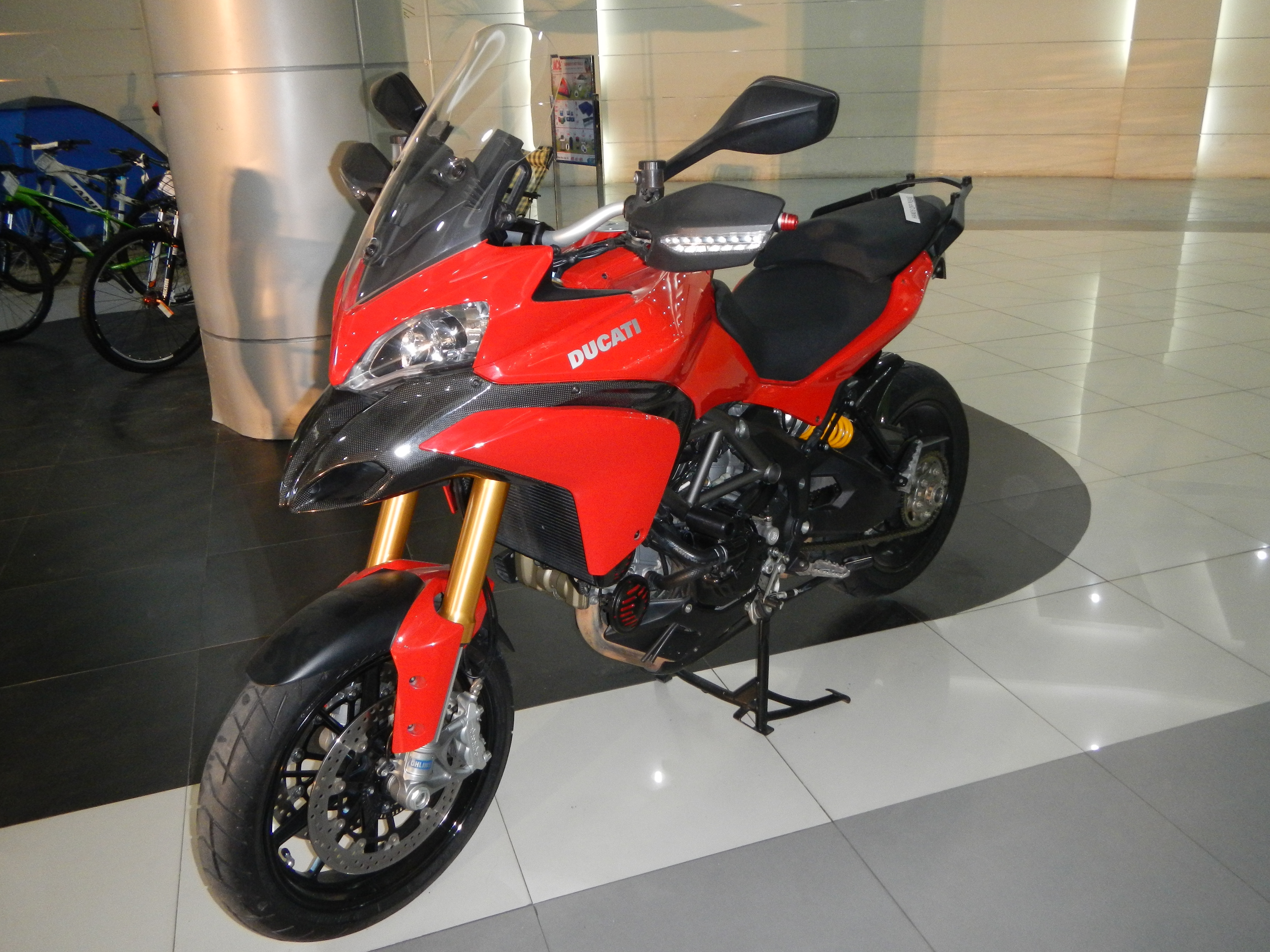
- Ducati Multistrada 1200
- Manufacturer: Ducati
- Production: 2003–Current
- Class: Adventure / Sport-touring

The Ducati Multistrada is a series of V2 and V4-engined adventure-touring motorcycles. First introduced in 2003 the Multistrada was essentially a novel combination of a comfortable adventure bike and a performant sport-tourer. The name "Multistrada" is an Italian neologism which roughly translates to "many roads", hinting at Ducati's intended versatility of the model.

The Multistrada competes in the same market space as other premium adventure bikes, for example the BMW GS or KTM Super Adventure. While the first iterations of the Multistrada was not intended for heavy off-road use, subsequently other models were introduced that were much more focused on a dual-sport role.

== Reception ==
The original Multistrada was designed by Pierre Terblanche who was Ducati's head designer at the time. Much like Ducati's contemporary sportsbike flagship, the Ducati 999, the original Multistrada received very mixed reviews for its unconventional aesthetics. However reviewers also noted that the motorcycle was "truly versatile" and despite being a seemingly odd combination of different styles of motorcycle that "Ducati have guessed right"

While initial uptake of the model was slow, the Multistrada went on to become the most important model in Ducati's lineup. In the first half of 2023, the Multistrada V4 (all versions combined) represented around 18% of motorcycles sold by the company.

== Model history ==
=== First generation: 2003 - 2009 ===
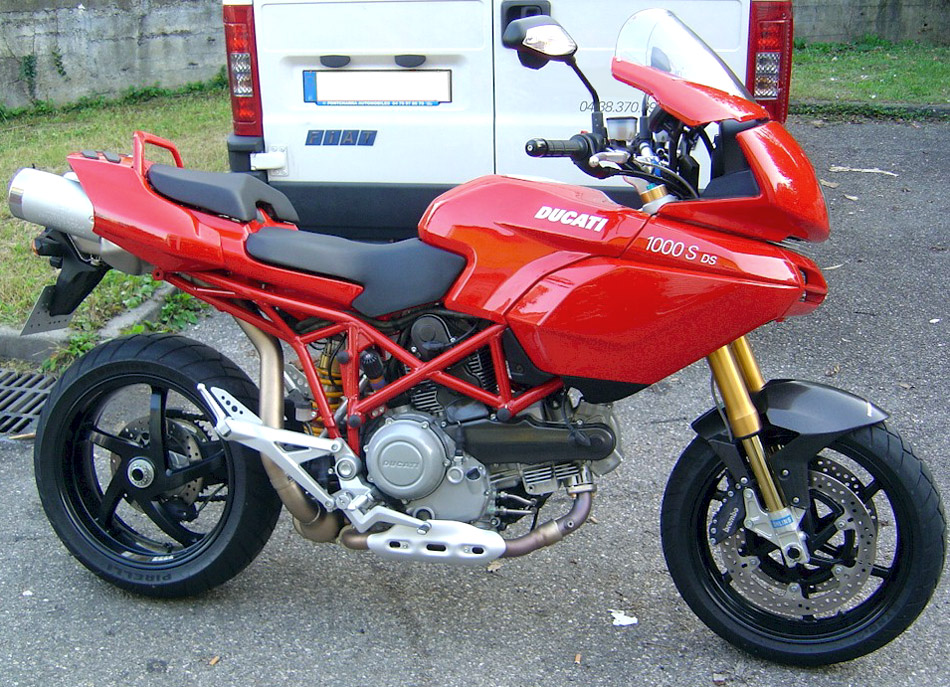
Ducati Multistrada 1000S DS

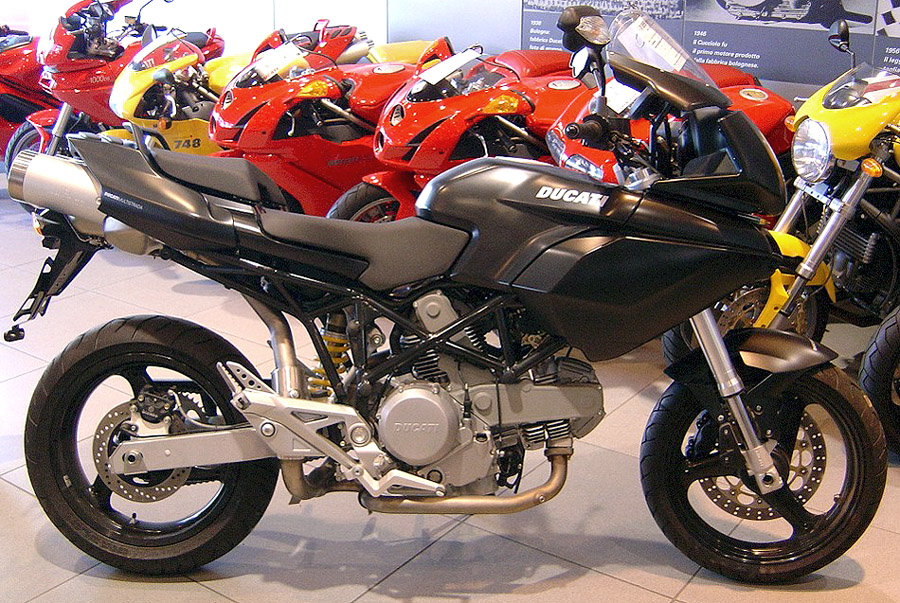
Ducati Multistrada 620 Dark

The Multistrada was introduced in 2003 with the 1000 DS being the sole model in the range. The Multistrada 1000 DS has a 992 cm^{3} air-cooled 90° V-twin engine delivering 84 hp, a fuel capacity of 20 litres and a dry weight of 188 kg. It shared its engine with other Ducati models of the time like the SuperSport and Monster.

In 2005 both the up-spec 1000S DS and the entry level 620 models were introduced. At the same time a host of smaller changes were introduced on all models to fix some common customer complaints. Therefore the sidestand was lengthened, the shape and covering of the seats were improved, the arms of the mirrors were made longer and the optional touring windshield was made standard fitment.

The 1000S DS model gained more expensive gold-coloured Öhlins suspension, black-painted wheels and an aluminium handlebar that improved handling and vibration.

The 620 model was simplified to lower the price point. Besides the smaller 618 cm^{3} engine changes included a smaller fuel capacity, a single front brake disc and a conventional rear swinging arm replacing the single-sided item. The 620 was the first model to have an oil-bathed wet clutch with a "slip-and-assist" function Ultimately the 620 version did not prove to be very popular and it was only produced from 2005-2007.

In 2007 another update was introduced releasing the Multistrada 1100 and 1100S models. The primary updates were to the engine, where the bore of the cylinders was increased by 4mm, which increased the displacement to 1,078 cm^{3} and the clutch was changed from a dry clutch to an oil-bathed wet unit. This was done in a effort to increase the torque and power of the engine while at the same time reducing both engine noise and exhaust emissions in order to meet the newly introduced EURO3 emissions standards. Claimed power was increased to 95 hp. The "DS" branding was dropped from the name, despite the engine retaining the dual spark ignition system. Ducati also changed their mandated servicing intervals, in a effort to decrease the cost of ownership.

=== Second Generation: 2010 - 2014 ===
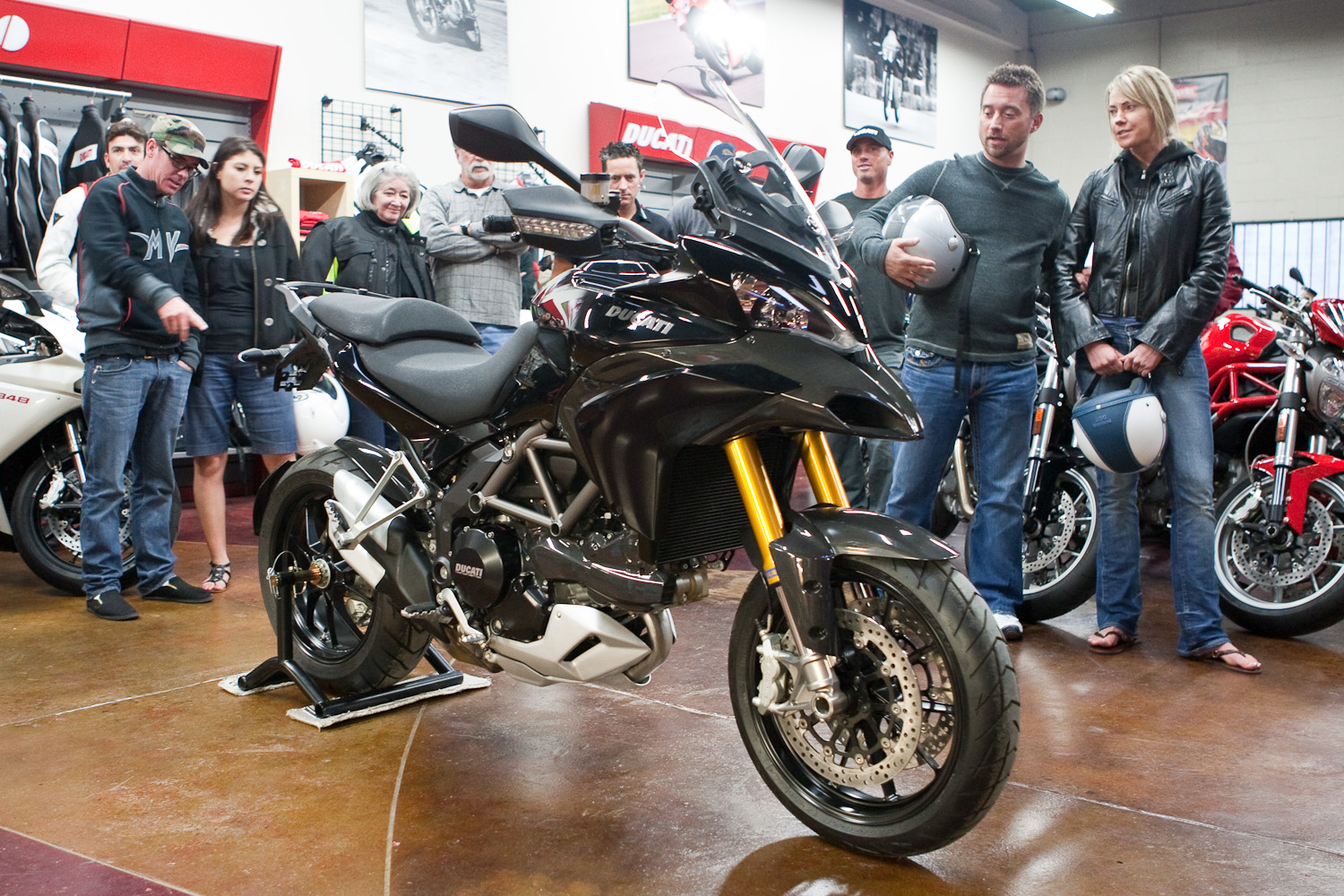
Ducati Multistrada 1200S (2010)

In November 2009 at the EICMA motorcycle trading show in Milan, the second generation of Ducati Multistrada was unveiled. Immediately public response was much more enthusiastic compared to the first generation, when the visitors of the show voted the new Multistrada 1200 as "Best Bike in Show" with 48% of the cast votes.

The Multistrada 1200 and 1200S have a 1,198 cm^{3} water-cooled 90° V-twin engine delivering 150 hp, a fuel capacity of 20 litres and a dry weight of 189 kg. These models represent a thorough redesign of the Multistrada and their concept would come to define the model for the years to come. The main difference between the standard and S-models being the introduction of electronically adjustable Öhlins suspension on the 1200S model.

The redesigned bodywork and frame were accompanied by a new engine adapted and retuned from the Ducati 1198 sport bike, dubbed the "Testastretta 11°" due to its 11 degrees of valve overlap. A host of other technical changes meant that power was reduced from 180 hp to 150 hp compared to the sportsbike, but low-down torque, flexibility and economy of the engine was improved. Service intervals were also lengthened further to require a major service only every 30.000 km, doubling that of the previous generation.

Perhaps the biggest innovation of the Multistrada 1200 was the introduction of "Riding Modes". While not being the first bike to introduce features like adjustable power modes, traction control or electronically adjustable suspension, the Multistrada 1200 was the first bike to combine the adjustment of all these features into preset riding modes; Sport, Touring, Urban and Enduro. This allowed the rider four distinctively different riding experiences, by selecting the different modes. Ducati called this "four bikes in one" and claimed it "further enhanc[es] a bike that has made versatility its very essence". Further underlining the claim of versatility of the motorcycle, Ducati worked together with Pirelli who developed a tyre called the "Scorpion Trail" specifically for the Multistrada. This tyre claimed a degree of off-road ability and was the factory fitment.

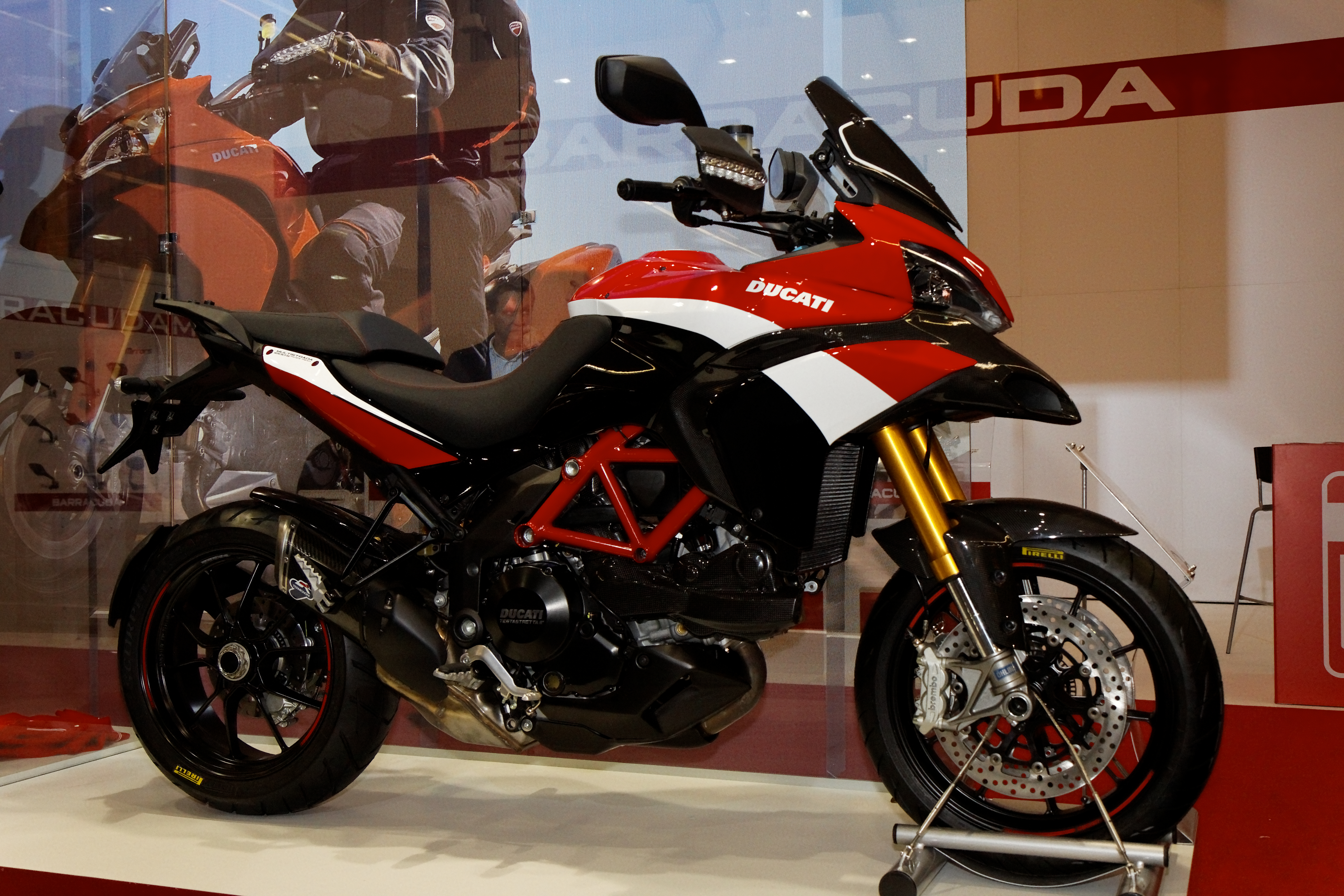
Ducati Multistrada 1200 Pikes Peak (2011)

In June 2010, motorcycle racer Greg Tracy won his class at the Pikes Peak International Hillclimb onboard a Multistrada 1200S. In commemoration of this Ducati introduced the "Pikes Peak" model to the range in 2011. This model was mechanically identical to the 1200S model but featured a special paintjob, red rim stripes, seats with red stitching and several carbon fibre accessories.

In 2013 a significant update was released for the Multistrada 1200 range. The engine gained dual spark ignition like the predecessor 1000 and 1100 models, which further improved torque and running characteristics. The design of the rims was updated. The design of the headlight and front fairing was slightly revised and the windscreen received a different shape along with a new system for easier height adjustment. The electronically adjustable suspension was replaced by semi-active components produced by Sachs. Dubbed "Ducati Skyhook Suspension" this system allowed for continuous autonomous adjustment of the suspension. A range of sensors enables the ECU of the suspension system to constantly adjust the settings to best suit the current driving conditions. Similarly the Pikes Peak model was updated with all the same improvements, while also gaining a new paint scheme reminiscent of Ducati's Grand Prix motorcycles and lighter forged rims produced by Marchesini.

Interestingly, Öhlins later offered an aftermarket ECU for the 2010-2012 bikes, which also enabled their suspension to become semi-active.

=== Third Generation: 2015 - 2024 ===
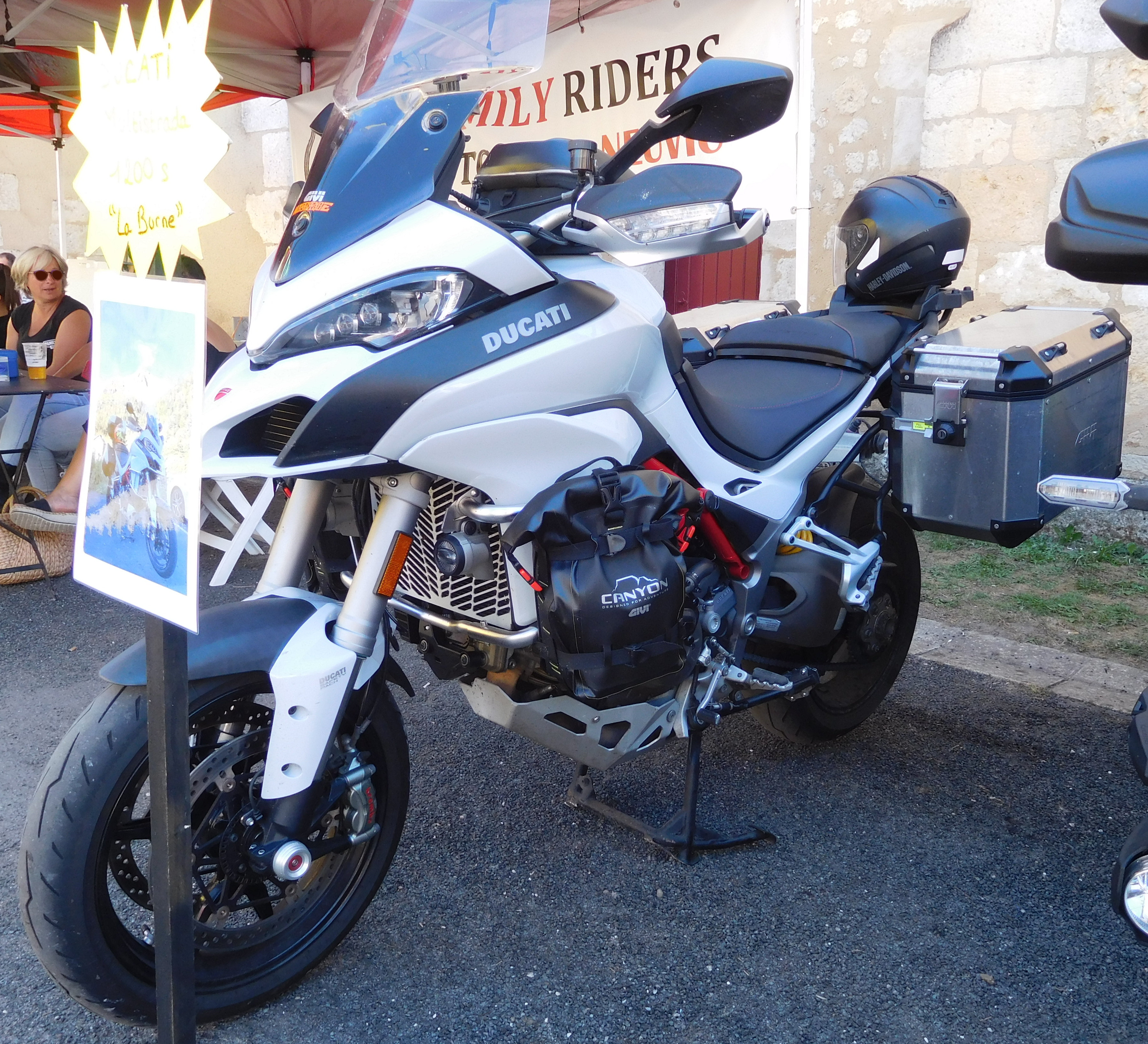
Ducati Multistrada 1200S (2015)

In 2015 the next iteration of the Multistrada models was released. While similar in concept and design to the 2010-2014 models, the 2015 models represented a big development technically.

The 2015 Multistrada 1200 and 1200S have a 1,198 cm^{3} water-cooled 90° V-twin engine delivering 160 hp, a fuel capacity of 20 litres and a dry weight of 212 kg.

The bike received a reworked engine dubbed the "Testastretta DVT" - DVT being an acronym for "Desmodromic Variable Timing". This engine features Variable valve timing on all four camshafts. This allowed Ducati to further improve engine characteristics and torque levels, while also increasing power and still meeting emission regulations.

Another new feature of the 1200 DVT models was the implementation of an Inertial Measurement Unit. This allows the electronic rider aids to respond to the attitude and accelerations forces acting on the motorcycle, improving the performance and safety of the traction control and anti lock brakes. The implementation of an IMU also allowed the introduction of new features like "wheelie control" and cornering lights. The motorcycle also received new switchgear, cruise control and on the S-model a colour TFT instrument cluster.

In 2016 Ducati introduced the Multistrada 1200 Enduro model. While versatility was always part of the philosophy behind the Multistrada models, the 1200 Enduro was the first model to focus on better performance in off-road conditions. Effectively Ducati's direct competitor to motorcycles like the BMW R1200GS Adventure and KTM 1290 Super Adventure T, this was the first model to feature longer suspension travel, larger ground clearance, 19-inch front wheel, wire-spoked wheels with optional off-road capable Pirelli tyres, a longer wheel base and a larger 30 litre fuel capacity. Due to the extra equipment and larger fuel tank, wet weight increased to 254 kg.

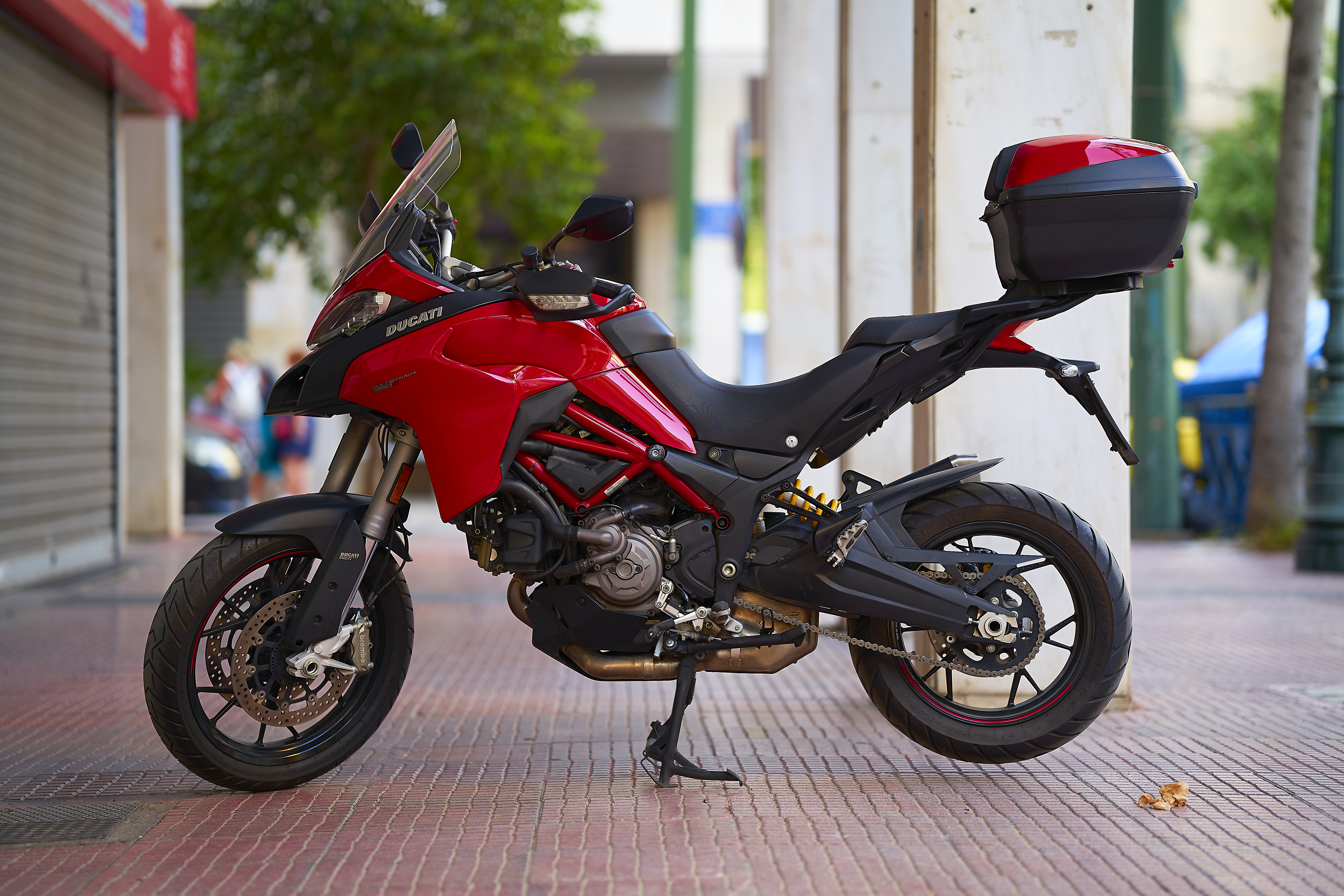
Ducati Multistrada 950S

In 2017 the entry level Multistrada 950 was introduced. The 2017 Multistrada 950 has a 937 cm^{3} water-cooled 90° V-twin engine delivering 113 hp, a fuel capacity of 20 litres and a dry weight of 204 kg. While the previous smaller 620 model was no success, the 950 model receives positive reviews for its good handling, sporty character and versatility, while being less intimidating and noticeably cheaper than the much more powerful bigger models. In 2019 the 950 model received a minor update including lighter rims, a hydraulic clutch, different bodywork and revised engine mapping. 2019 also introduces the 950S model that gains electronic suspension, IMU, colour TFT instrument and LED headlight equipping it very similarly to the bigger 1200S model.

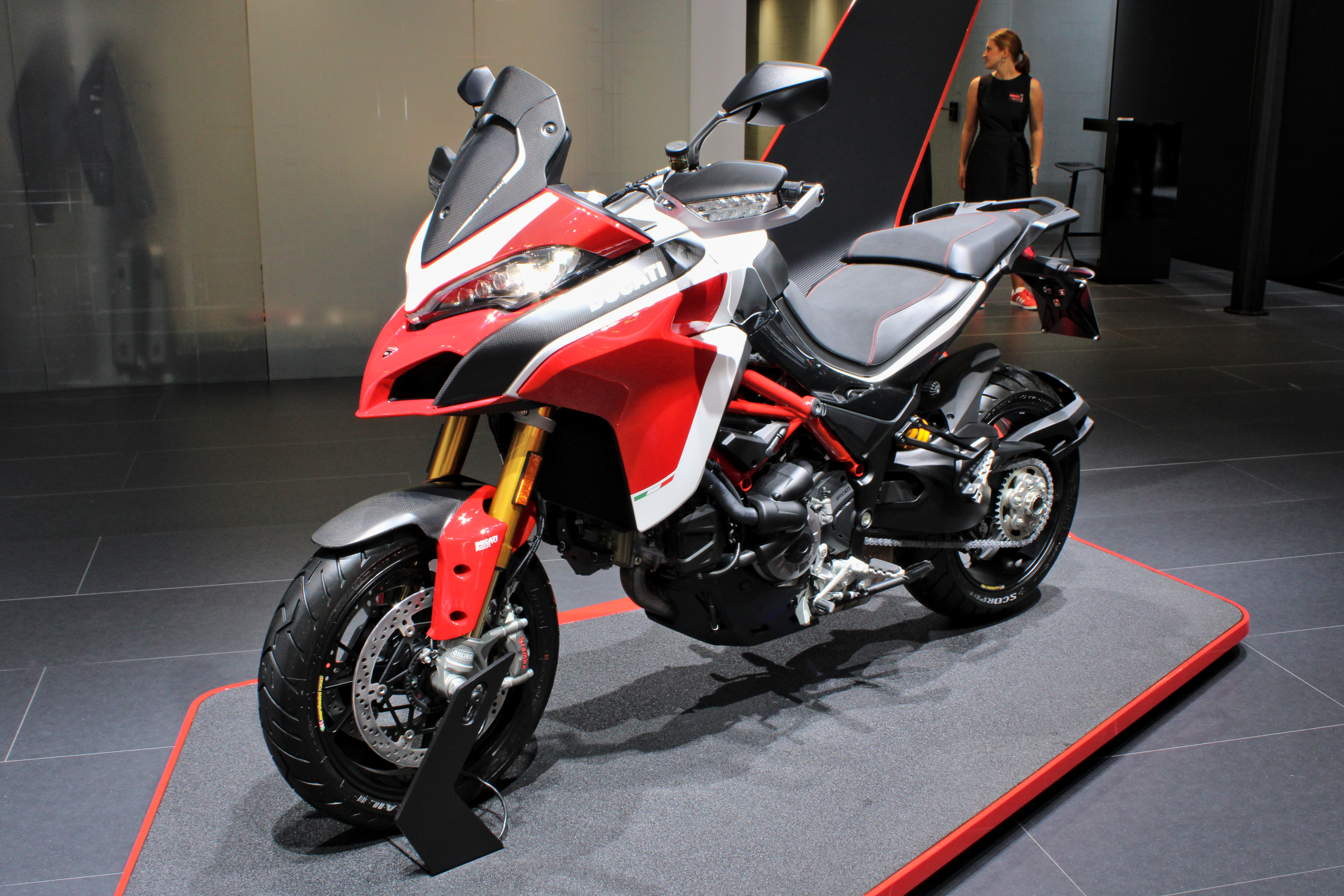
Ducati Multistrada 1260 Pikes Peak

In 2018 the Multistrada 1260,1260S and 1260 Pikes Peak models are introduced. More of a technical update than an outright new model, the 1260 models centers around changes to the engine and chassis, which addresses some smaller issues noted with the 1200 DVT models. The engine's stroke was increased by 3.6mm resulting in a new displacement of 1,262 cm^{3}. The engine now conforming to EURO4 emission standards meant power output actually dropped slightly to 156 hp, but torque increased to 136 nm and more importantly a slight dip in performance from 5.000-6.000 rpm present on the 1200 DVT engine was resolved. The 1260 also received a significantly longer rear swinging arm increasing the wheelbase by 56mm. Combined with a rake angle that was made 1° flatter, this resulted in a significant increase in stability at high speed. A year later in 2019 the Enduro model is updated with the same improvements to the engine and electronics, resulting in the Multistrada 1260 Enduro.

In 2022 the 950 models are updated again and renamed as the Multistrada V2 and V2S. This is done to keep the nomenclature inline with the bigger model, which in the meantime had moved on to the fourth generation. The update to the V2 and V2S includes minor updates to the engine along with even lighter rims, brakes and mirrors, totaling a loss of 5 kg. Most significant is probably a change to the seats, which make reaching the ground easier for the rider. Motor Cycle News' reviewer Michael Neeves notes, that these updates make the Multistrada V2S actually "better than the V4 on almost every occasion".

=== Fourth Generation: 2021 - Current ===
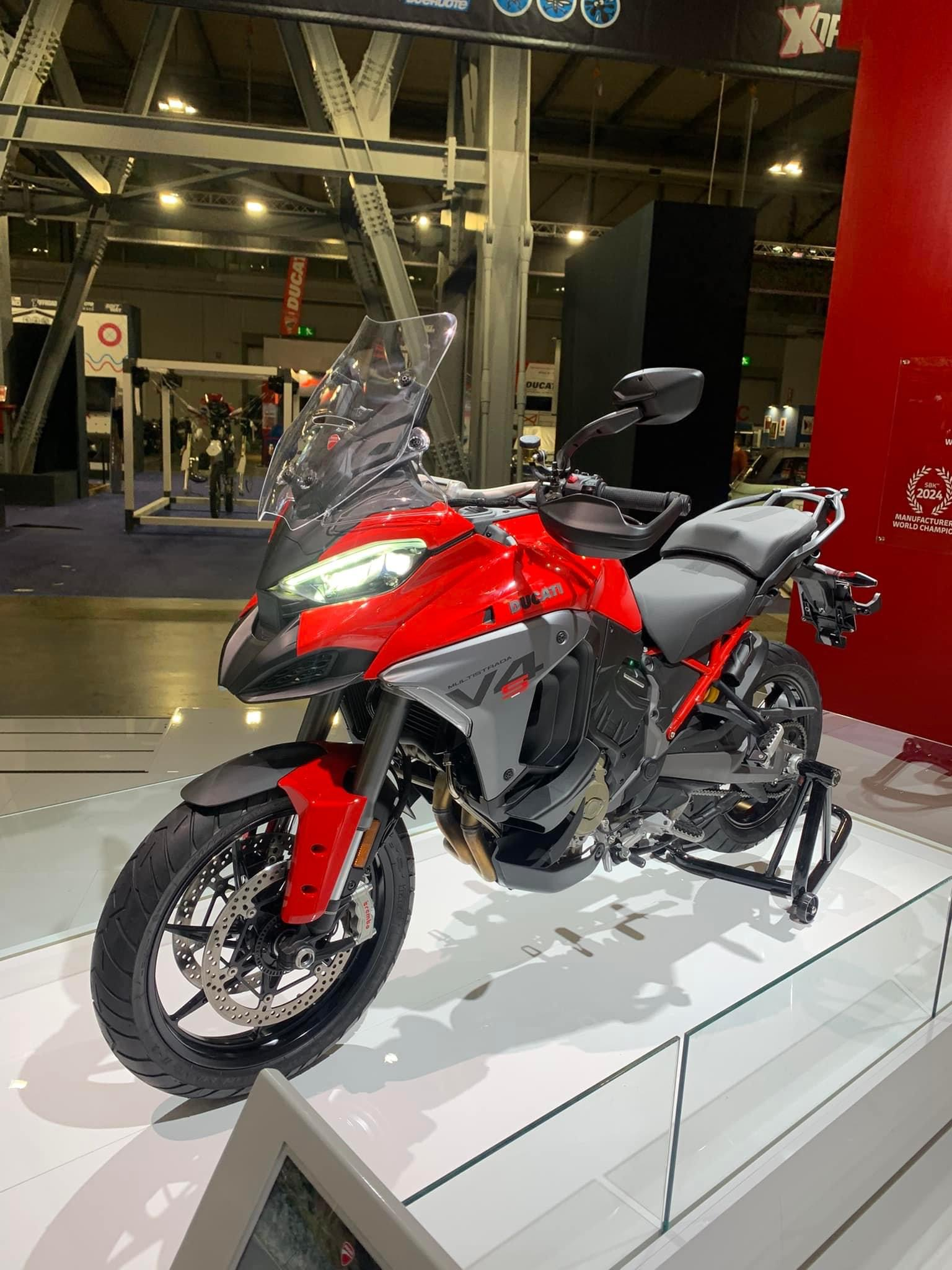
Ducati Multistrada V4 (2025)

In November 2020, the next generation of Multistrada was officially announced by Ducati for the 2021 model year. Seeing what a fundamental change in architecture this new model represented, Ducati actually considered to give the new model a different name than "Multistrada".

The 2021 Multistrada V4 and V4S have a 1,158 cm^{3} water-cooled 90° V4 engine delivering 170 hp, a fuel capacity of 22 litres and a dry weight of 240 kg

The Multistrada V4 and V4S were based around a newly developed version of the company's V4 "Desmosedici Stradale" engine from the Panigale V4 sportbike. This new engine dubbed the "V4 Granturismo" was enlarged to 1,158 cm^{3} of displacement and redesigned without Desmodromic valve actuation, a hallmark of all Ducati engines for many years. The benefit of this was that Ducati could offer a much longer service interval of 60.000 km between valve adjustments.

On the chassis front another staple of Ducati tradition, the steel trellis frame was replaced with an aluminium monocoque making the engine itself a major loadbearing component of the motorcycle's construction. The front wheel size was changed to 19 inches and the rear swinging arm was changed to a double-sided unit. At the time this was controversial and some fans lamented these changes, as some saw this as a move away from the very sporty characteristics of previous models. Another common negative feedback is the noticeably worse fuel economy of the new V4 engine, with consumption increasing around 20%. This is partially offset by a 10% larger fuel tank of 22 litres.

The Multistrada V4S was also equipped with an extensive package of electronics. Adding onto the already established rider aids and semi-active suspension, the V4S model is the first motorcycle to be equipped with two radars, enabling the addition of adaptive cruise control and blind spot detection.

Despite some controversy the Multistrada V4 and V4S received positive reviews, with reviewer Simon Hargreaves concluding "it’s one of the best bikes I’ve ever ridden"

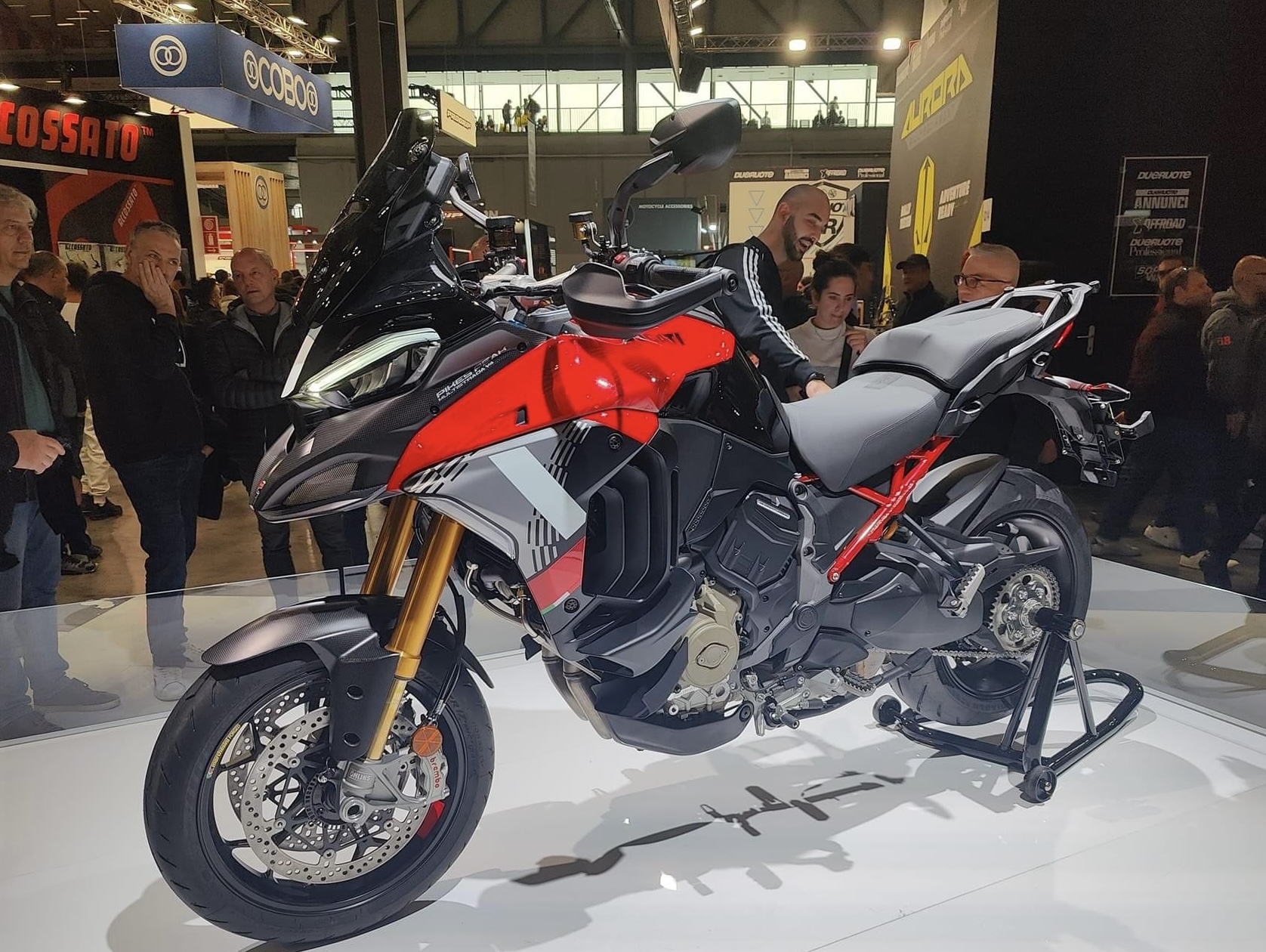
Ducati Multistrada V4 Pikes Peak (2025)

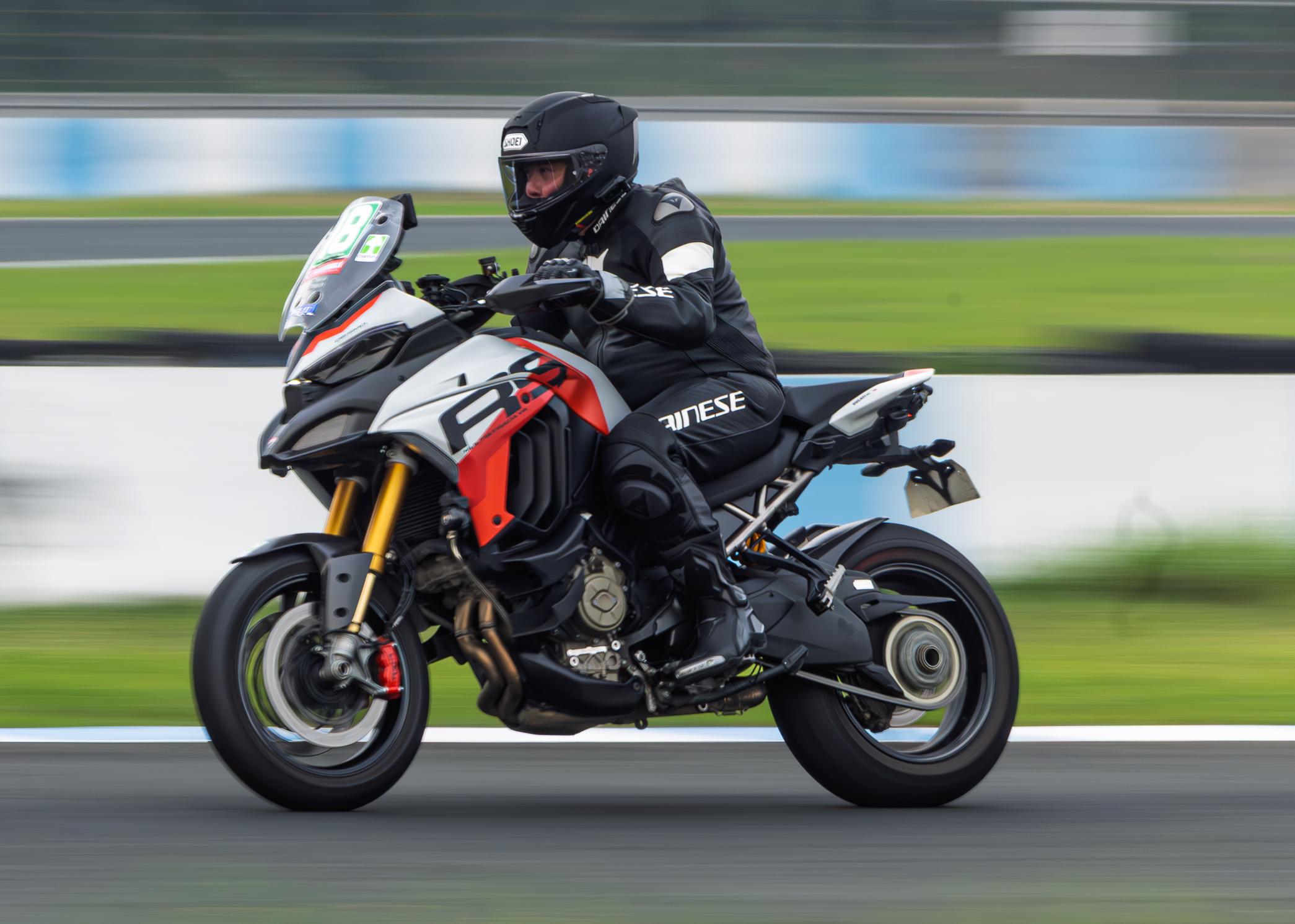
Ducati Multistrada V4 RS

In 2022 (perhaps having anticipated feedback about the V4) Ducati introduce the Multistrada V4 Pikes Peak. Now much more a separate model in its own right than previous generations, the Pikes Peak model reintroduces the 17-inch front wheel and the single sided rear swinging arm, along with changes to electronics, suspension, tyre sizes and the exhaust system. In 2023 a Multistrada V4 Rally version was introduced. Essentially the successor to the 1260 Enduro model, this bike introduces longer suspension travel, wire spoked wheels, adjusted electronics and a larger 30 litre aluminum fuel tank.

In 2024 an additional model called the Multistrada V4 RS was introduced. In the same vein as the Pikes Peak, this model is even sportier and track-focused. Sharing its 1,103 cm^{3} engine with the Ducati Streetfighter V4 this is the most powerful Multistrada yet with a claimed output of 180 hp.

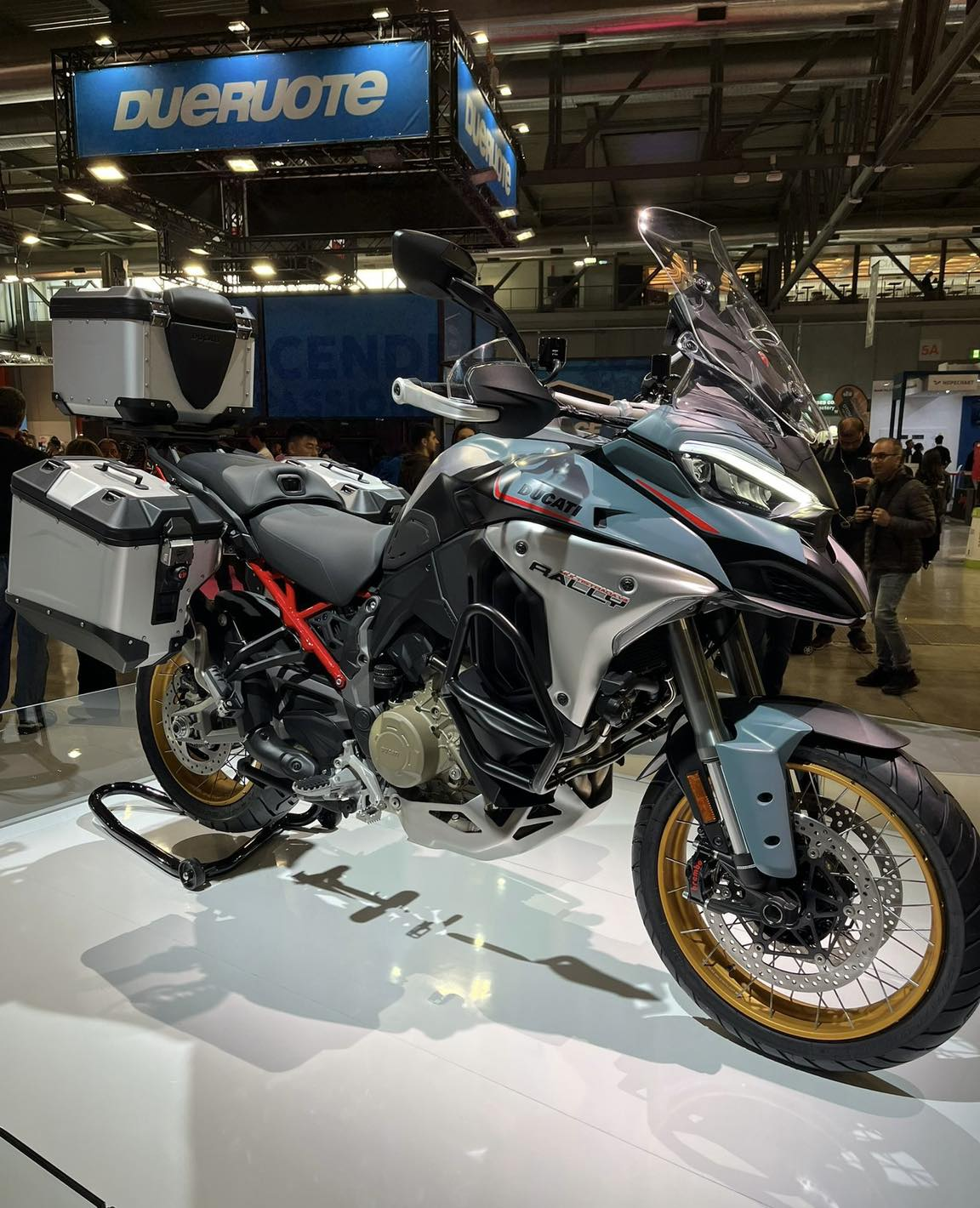
Ducati Multistrada V4 Rally (2026)

For 2025 the Multistrada V4, V4S and V4 Pikes Peak all received a host of smaller updates. These changes include updates to the engine and engine management to conform to EURO5+ emissions standards, rear cylinder deactivation which decreases fuel consumption by 6%, updates to the rider aids and instrument including the implementation of "Ducati Vehicle Observer", several smaller changes to the design of the headlight and fairings along with different colours. Very similar updates were implemented in the Multistrada V4 Rally model for 2026.

Also for 2025 new Multistrada V2 and V2S models were introduced. These were a replacement for the ageing 950-based models. Similarly to the V4 the new V2 models represent a big change in architecture. A new 890 cm^{3} V2 "IVT" engine is used, with a design significantly different compared to the previous Testastretta engine. This engine is paired with a front aluminium monocoque chassis in a manner very similar to the V4. Weight savings in both the new engine and chassis result in a claimed weight reduction of 18 kg compared to the previous V2 model.

The 2025 Multistrada V2 and V2S have a 890 cm^{3} water-cooled 90° V2 engine delivering 115 hp, a fuel capacity of 19 litres and a dry weight of 202 kg
