= Ducati 750 Imola Desmo =

750 Imola Desmo
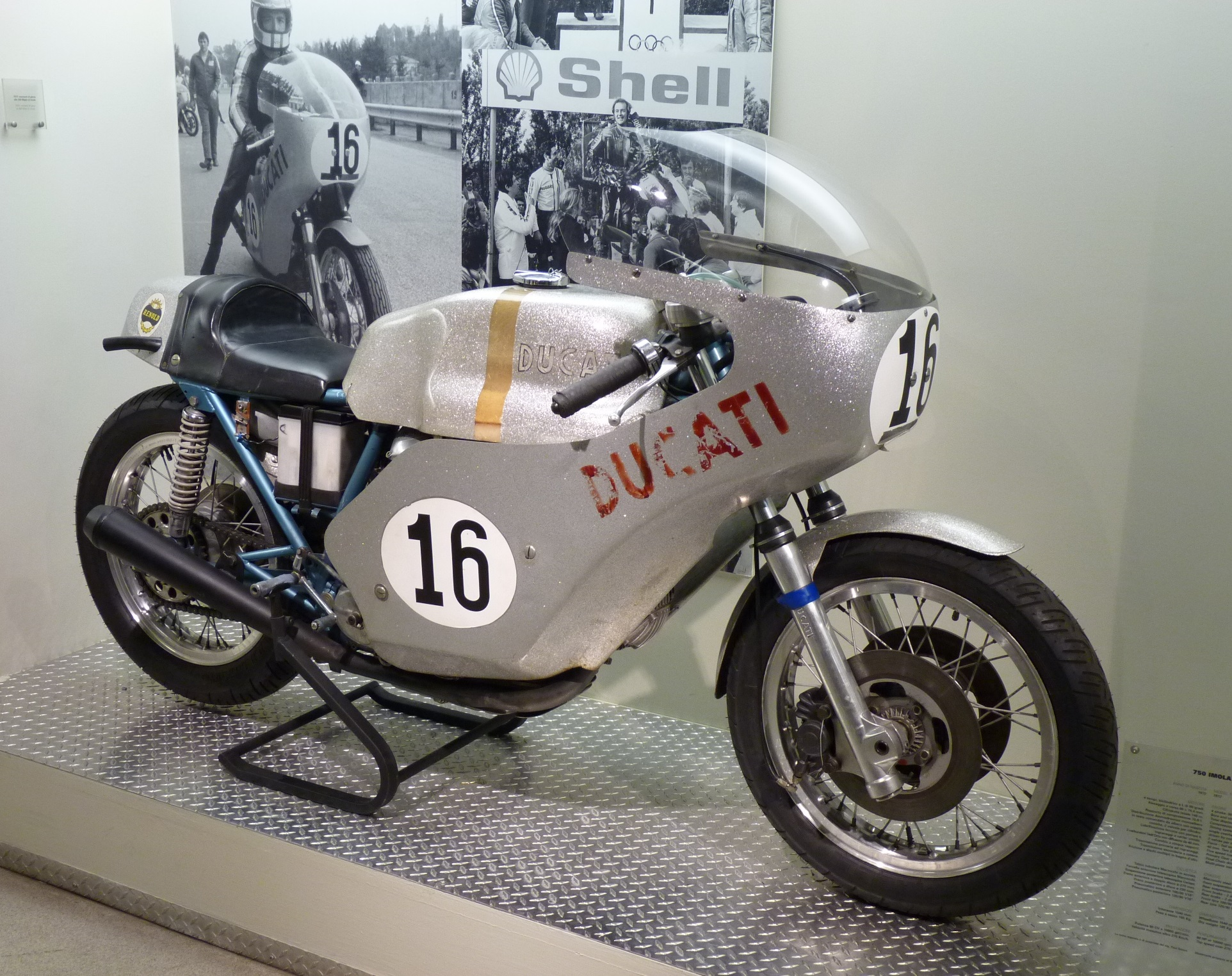
- Manufacturer: Ducati
- Production: 1972
- Class: Racing
- Engine: 748 cc (45.6 cu in) 2-valve per cylinder desmodromic air cooled 90° V-twin
- Bore / stroke: 80.0 mm × 74.4 mm (3.15 in × 2.93 in)
- Compression ratio: 10.8:1
- Top speed: 249 km/h (155 mph)
- Power: 84 hp (63 kW) @ 8800 rpm
- Transmission: 5-speed
- Suspension: Front: Marzocchi telescopic fork Rear: pivoting fork with Ceriani suspension units
- Brakes: Front: dual 270 mm disc Rear: single 230 mm disc
- Tires: Front: 100/90 V18; Rear: 120/90 V18
- Wheelbase: 1,540 mm (61 in)

The Ducati 750 Imola Desmo is a racing motorcycle built by Ducati that won the 1972 Imola 200 race in the hands of Paul Smart. This win helped define Ducati's approach to racing.

== Design ==
On March 20, 1970, Fabio Taglioni (September 10, 1920 – July 18, 2001) made the first sketches for the layout of a new Ducati V-twin engine. By April his drawings were completed, and by July, there was a running motor. By August 1970, there was a complete prototype motorcycle. Taglioni engaged Leopoldo Tartarini, the founder of Italjet, to refine the styling aspects of the new Ducati.

In October 1970, the decision was made by Ducati to re enter motorcycle competition. Director Arnaldo Milvio and General Manager Fredmano Spairani, were enthusiastic about racing, and had encouraged Fabio Taglioni to develop the 750 V twin.

== GP V-twins ==
In 1971 five 500 cc V-twins were built to compete in Italian championship and Grand Prix events. Ducati felt that this would demonstrate the bike before a large audience and gain publicity. If they won, that was a bonus.

=== Seeley ===
Even before this, in late 1970, and despite Taglioni's opposition to the idea, Spairani wanted the frame for Ducati's racer to be built by Colin Seeley, a well-known British specialist frame builder of the time. Seeley was asked to develop a racing frame similar to those he had built for Matchless G50 engines. Ducati sent some prototype crankcases for Seeley to work from and the new Seeley frame was ready in February 1971. Meanwhile, in less than six months, Fabio Taglioni and his team had designed and built their own complete bike.

=== GP Bike technical details ===
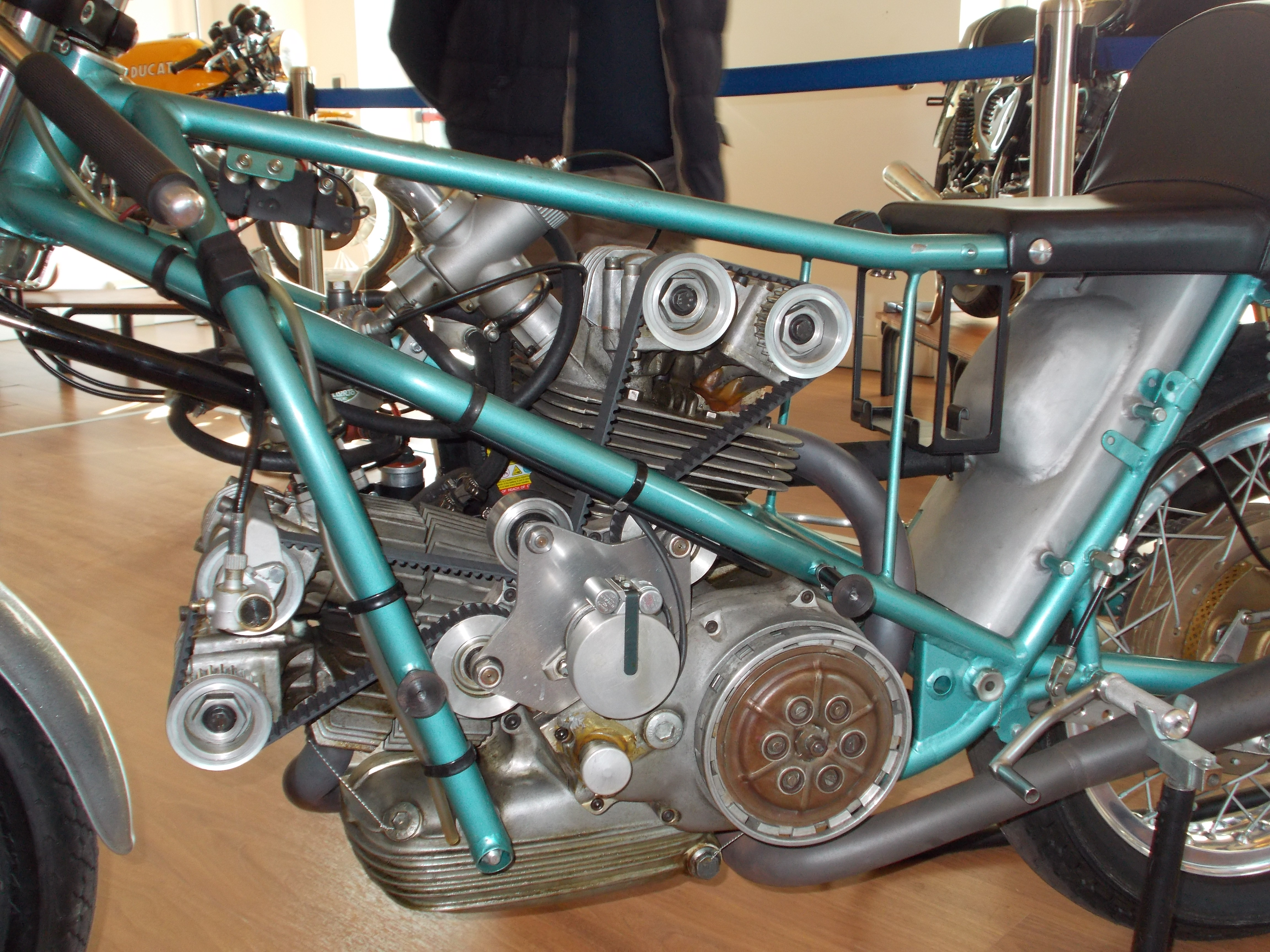
Restored 500 cc GP racer

While the 750 cc and 500 cc racers were very similar, the 500 had a much shorter 58 mm stroke, with the same 74 mm bore as the 750. The 500 had the same bore and stroke as the later 500 Pantah. It had 10.5:1 compression and initially produced 61.2 bhp at 11,000 rpm. All Ducati's 500 cc GP engines used desmodromic two-valve heads with an 80 degree included valve angle. They used remote float bowl Dell'Orto 40 mm carburettors, and had a six-speed gearbox with a dry, multiplate clutch. Ignition was electronic, provided by nearby Ducati Elettrotecnica, but was initially unreliable. Dual spark plugs were used, and the final ignition system used four coils, two on each side of the frame.

In the beginning Taglioni's Ducati chassis was used. It had a single Lockheed front disc brake and a twin leading shoe Fontana rear drum brake. Dry weight was 135 kg (297 lb) and it had 18 inch rims front and rear with 3.00 and 3.25 wheel rims. The wheelbase was 1430mm (56.3 in).

In June 1971, Phil Read tested the 500 cc bike with the Seeley frame, and pronounced it the better of the two. The frame was then fitted to Spaggiari's bike as well. It was raced in 1972 by Bruno Spaggiari, Ermanno Guliano and Phil Read.

== Production 750 GT ==
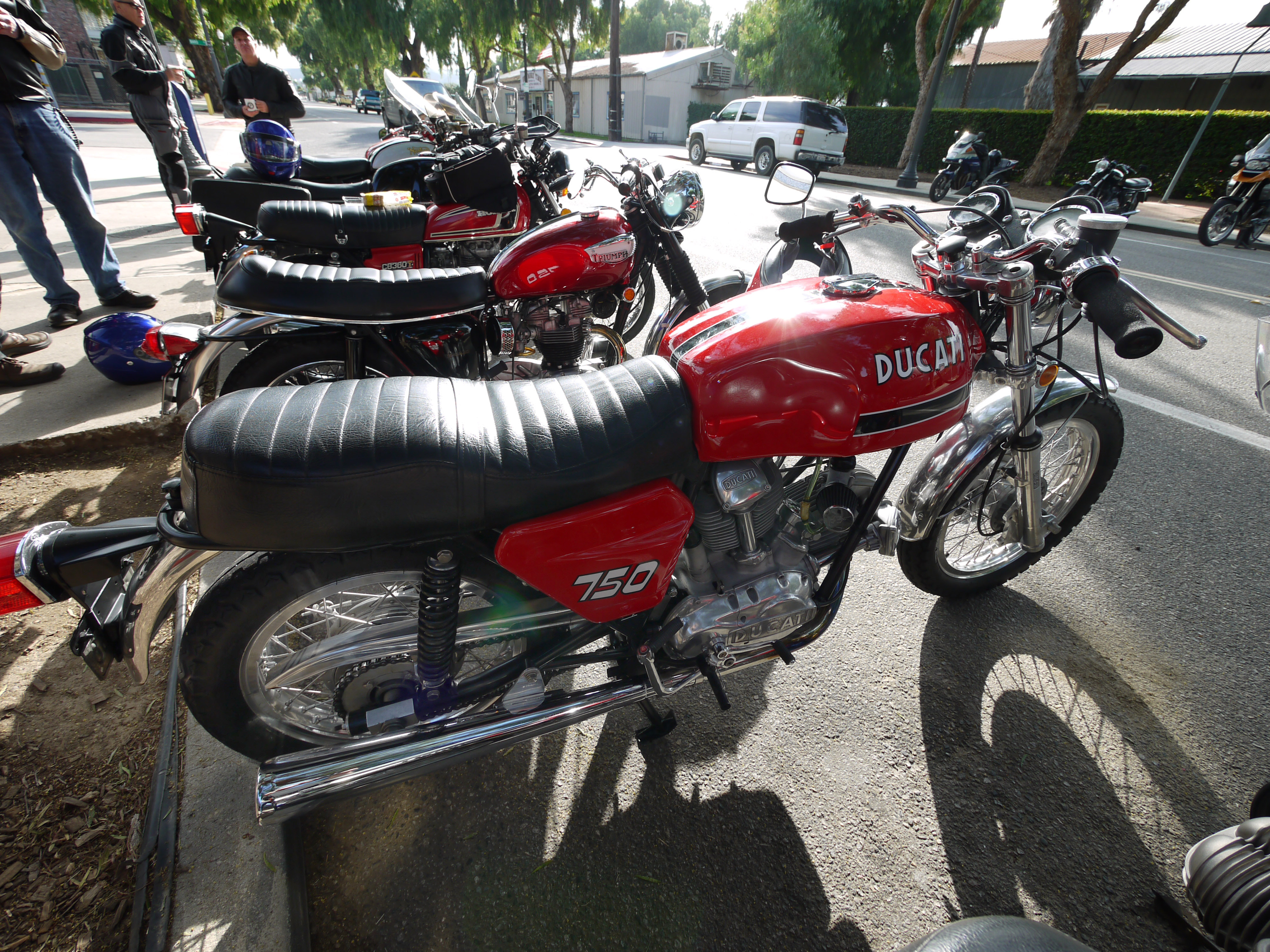
1972 Ducati 750 GT

Also in June 1971, the first Ducati 750 GT models came out of the factory, distinguished by silver frames, metal-flake paint, fibreglass fuel tanks, 1 1/8" (1.125") Amal carburettors, and twin leading shoe rear brakes.

At least one machine from this initial run is thought to have arrived at the US importer, Berliner - another early machine (possibly the test mule - complete with Dunstall dual front discs on gaitered Norton forks) was pictured much earlier, on Vic Camp's display at the 1970-71 winter UK national motorcycle show.

=== Imola 750 bikes ===
Taglioni experimented with four valve heads at this time, but failed to produce better power figures than his two valve heads, so the two valve racers continued. He continued to experiment with four valve heads until 1973. In 1971 race results were spoilt by a run of gearbox and ignition problems. Phil Read's second to Agostini in the San Remo Grand Prix, and a fourth, also by Read, at Monza in the Grand Prix delle Nazione were the highlights of the season.

A Seeley frame 750 cc had been tested by Mike Hailwood at Silverstone in August 1971 with a view to competing in F750. Hailwood decided against it, saying he didn't think the handling was good enough. Taglioni had already produced a new frame, for the production bike, incorporating some of the Seeley features. He later said he felt the Seeley frame had been too light for the V twins. They used the production frame for the 1972 Imola bikes.

The 200 Mile formula was first run in Italy in 1972, at Imola. Ducati prepared eight 750 cc bikes for the event. Paul Smart, Bruno Spaggiari, Ermanno Giuliano, and Alan Dunscombe were secured as riders. By now racing fever had set in, and the factory wanted to win. The bikes had the new factory frames and 750 engines, and were once more prepared in a very short time. Wherever possible the bike was lightened, and new 40 mm Dell'Orto carburetors with accelerator pumps were used. These engines delivered 80 hp (59 kW) at 8,500 rpm.

=== Victory ===
In that Imola 200 held in April, Smart and Spaggiari came in first and second. Ducati V-twin motorcycles received a lot of publicity from the win. This inspired the green frame 1974 Ducati 750 Super Sports. These bikes serve as the inspiration for the retro-styled 2005 PaulSmart 1000 LE, one of the SportClassic series.
