= Pierre Terblanche =

South African motorcycle designer

- Born: 6 November 1956; Uitenhage, South Africa
- Occupation: Motorcycle designer

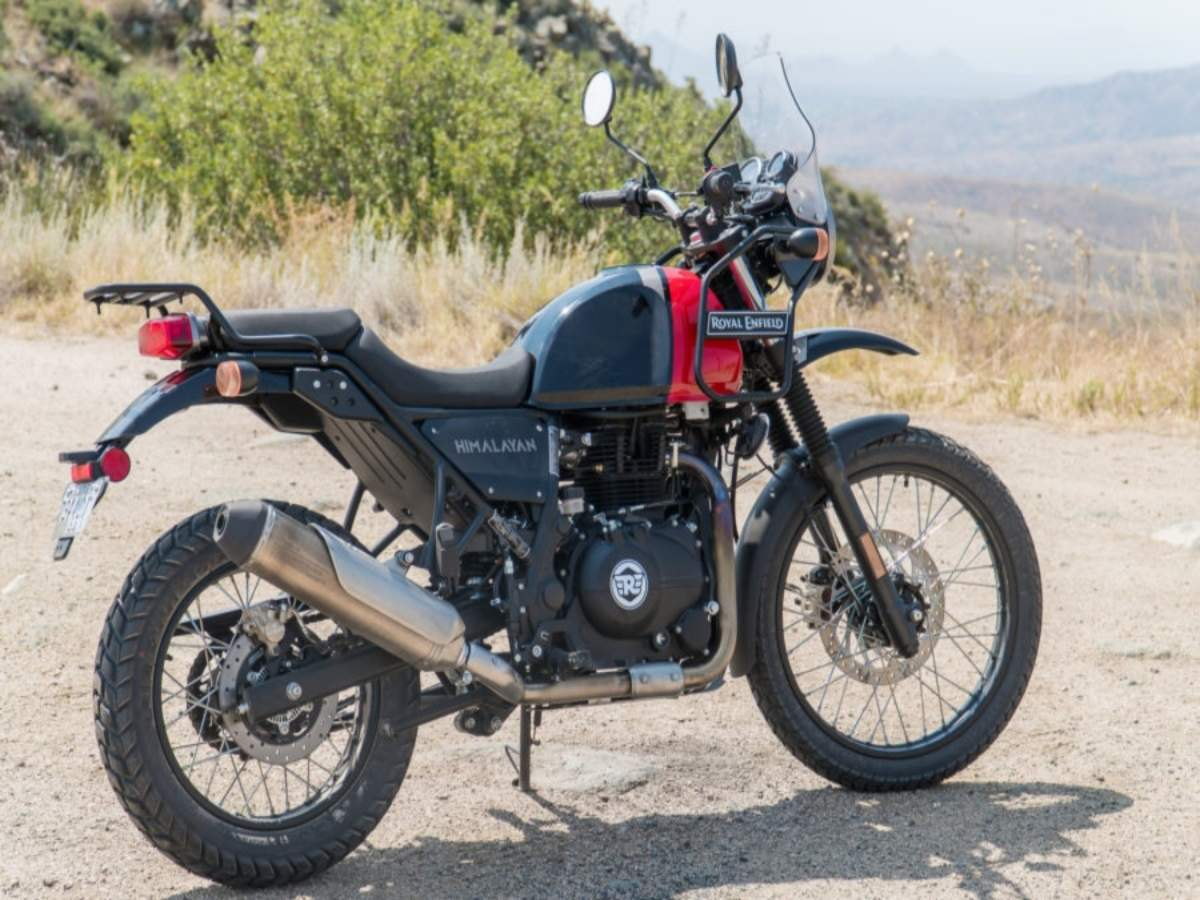
Royal Enfield Himalayan

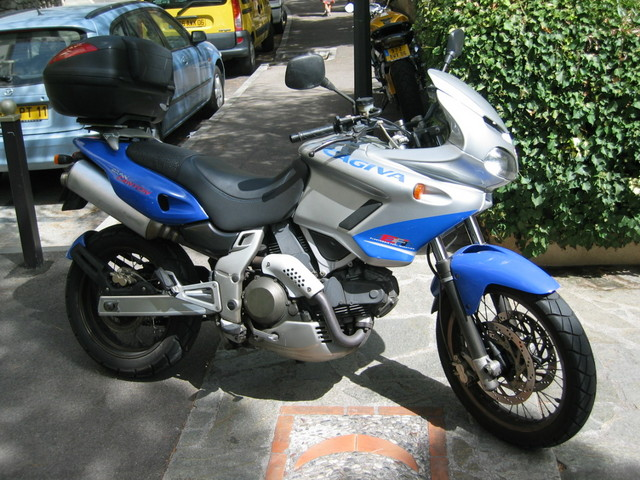
Cagiva 900 Gran Canyon

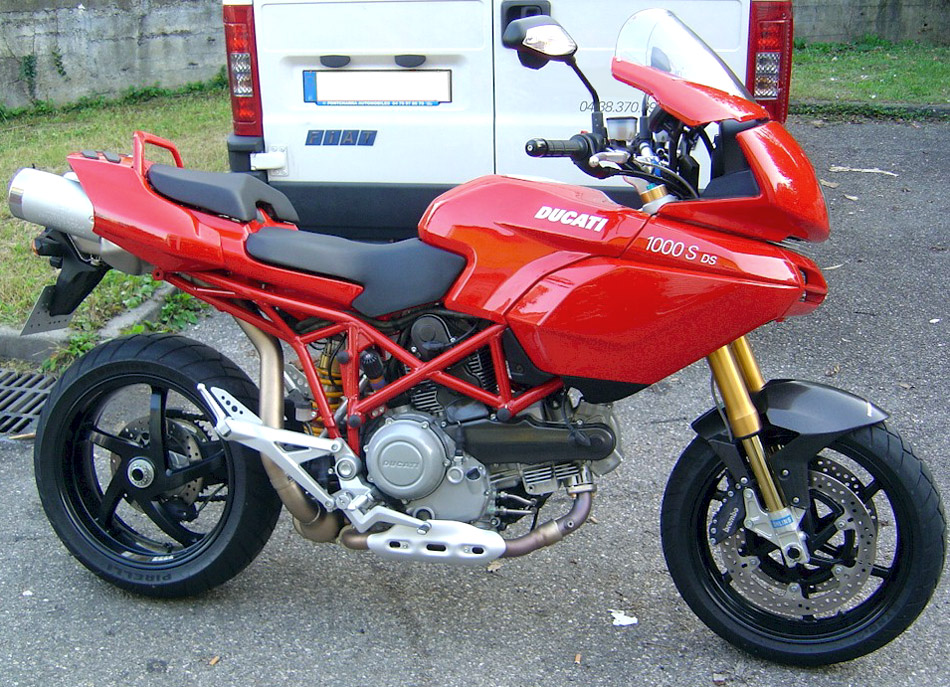
Ducati Multistrada 1000 S

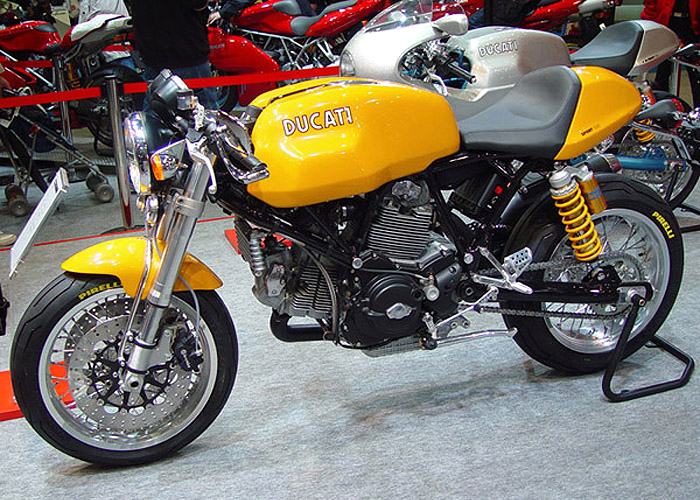
Ducati Sport 1000

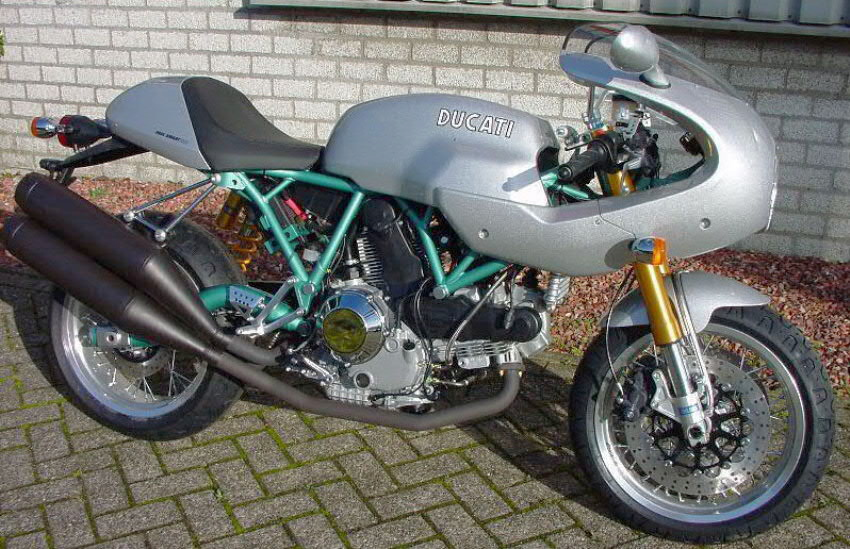
Ducati PaulSmart 1000 LE

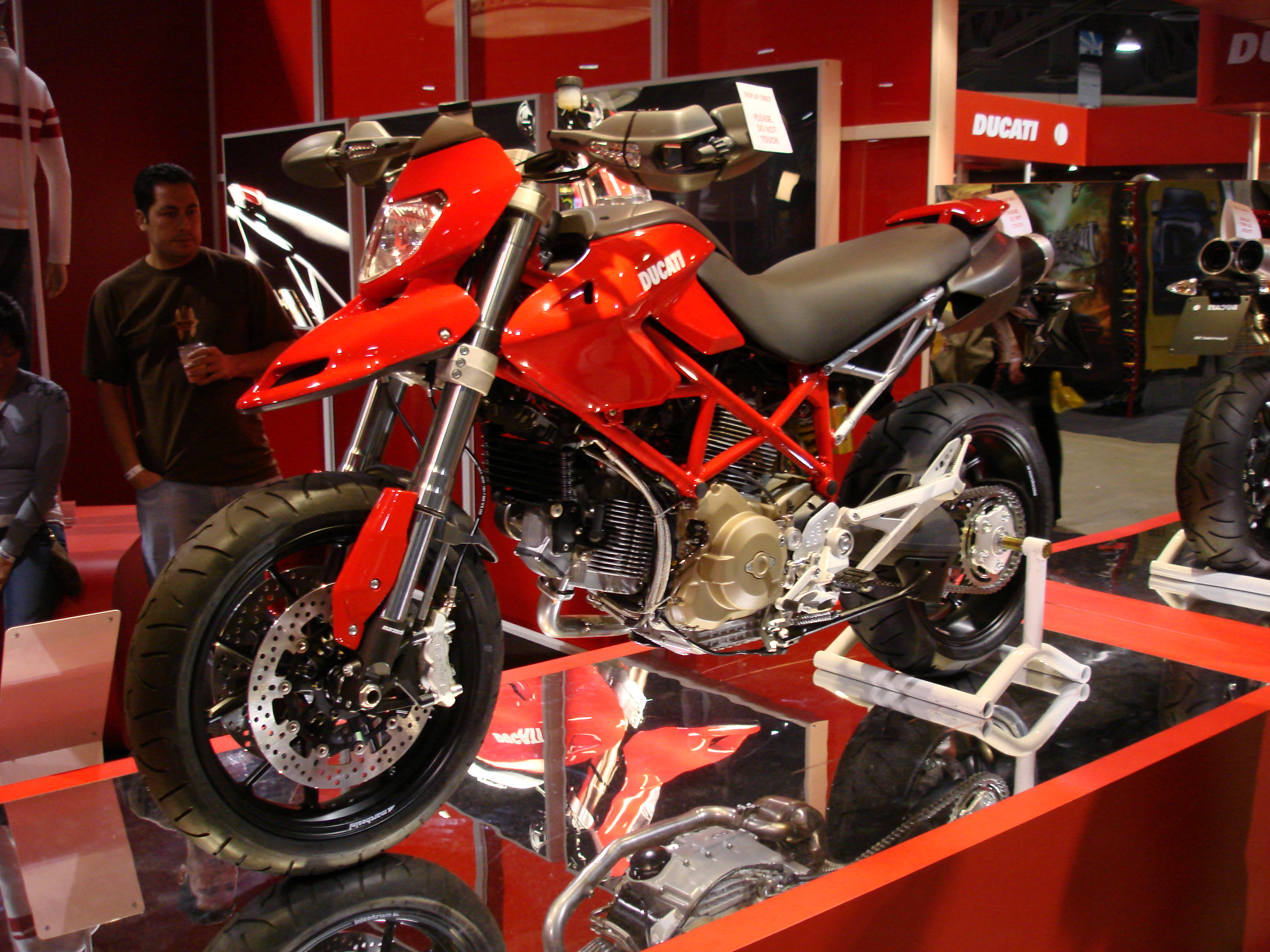
Ducati Hypermotard

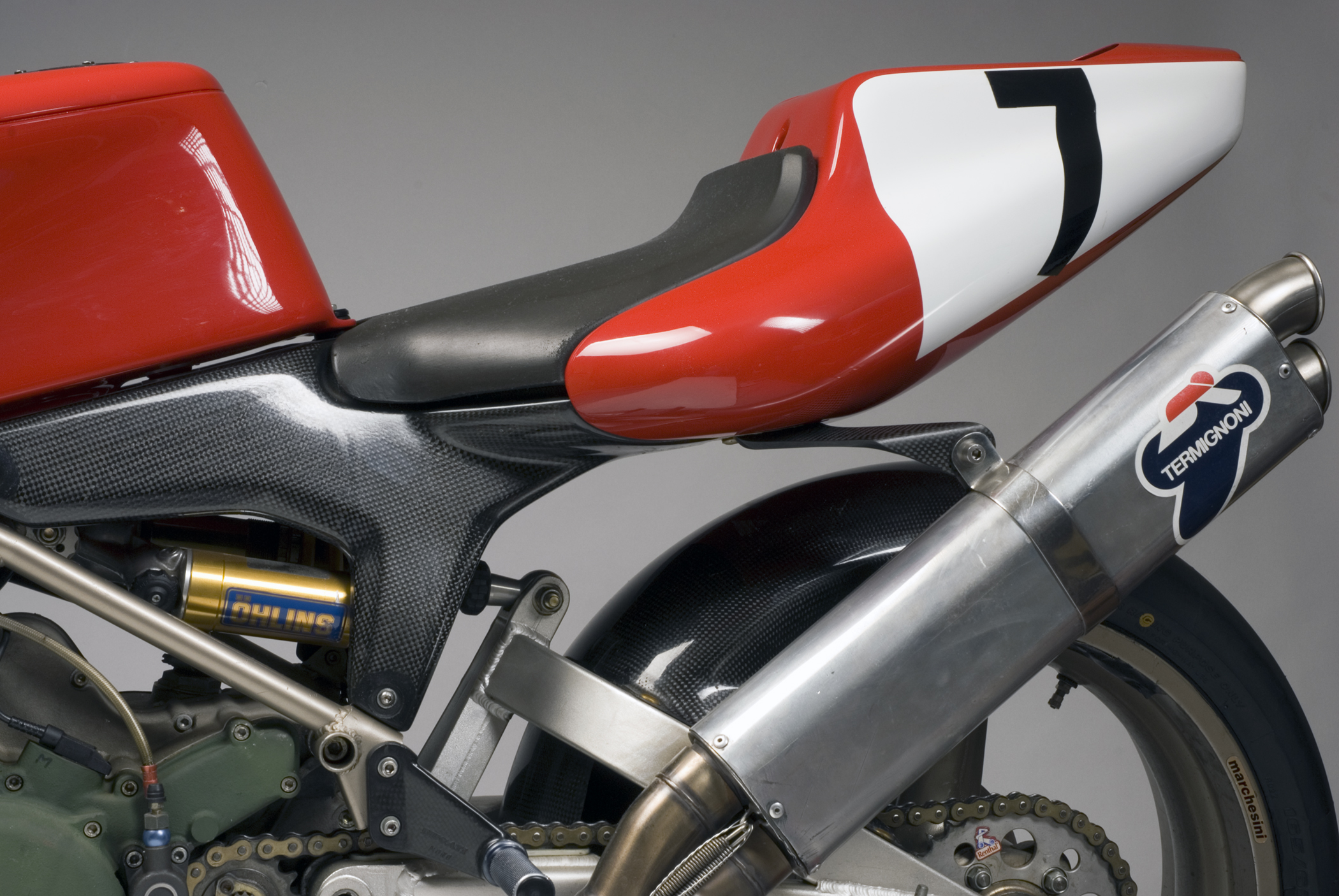
Ducati Supermono

Pierre Terblanche is a South African motorcycle designer born on 6 November 1956 in Uitenhage, Eastern Cape. He started his career in advertising but felt the need to move into the design world. After moving to Germany and working with Volkswagen design, he worked at Cagiva's research center at San Marino under the direction of Massimo Tamburini. When Cagiva decided to sell Ducati to US-based Texas Pacific Group, Pierre Terblanche chose to follow Ducati. In December 2007, he left Ducati to pursue other interests, believing that he should be a designer and not a manager.

Subsequently, Pierre Terblanche worked for Piaggio on the Moto Guzzi and other brands, along with former colleague Miguel Angel Galluzzi, who designed the Ducati Monster. Terblanche left Piaggio to join Norton Motorcycle Company in January 2011.

In early 2013, it was announced that Terblanche had joined Confederate Motors in Alabama, United States, as head of product development, and in August 2014 his first Confederate design, the X132 Hellcat Speedster, was shown.

In late 2014, Terblanche left Confederate to join Royal Enfield in India. After working for 20 months at Royal Enfield, Terblanche resigned from his post on 2 August 2016 for reasons unknown.

At the 2019 EICMA show, carbon fiber wheel manufacturer Blackstone (BST) unveiled the hyperTEK. The motorcycle is the first in-house electric motorcycle; Terblanche, who designed the motorcycle, stated that the hyperTEK is 'the best work I have ever done.'

== Designs ==
Terblanche designed the following motorcycles:

- Ducati 888
- Ducati ST Series
- Cagiva 600 Canyon
- Cagiva 900 Gran Canyon
- Ducati Multistrada
- Ducati Hypermotard
- Ducati Supermono
- 1999–2007 Ducati SuperSport
- Ducati MH900e
- Ducati 749/999
- Ducati SportClassics
- Moto Guzzi Concepts - Eicma 2014
- Confederate X132 Hellcat Speedster
- Royal Enfield Himalayan
- BST hyperTEK Concept - Eicma 2019
- Ducati 900 Supersport 1998
