= Imola 200 =

Annual motorcycle race in Italy

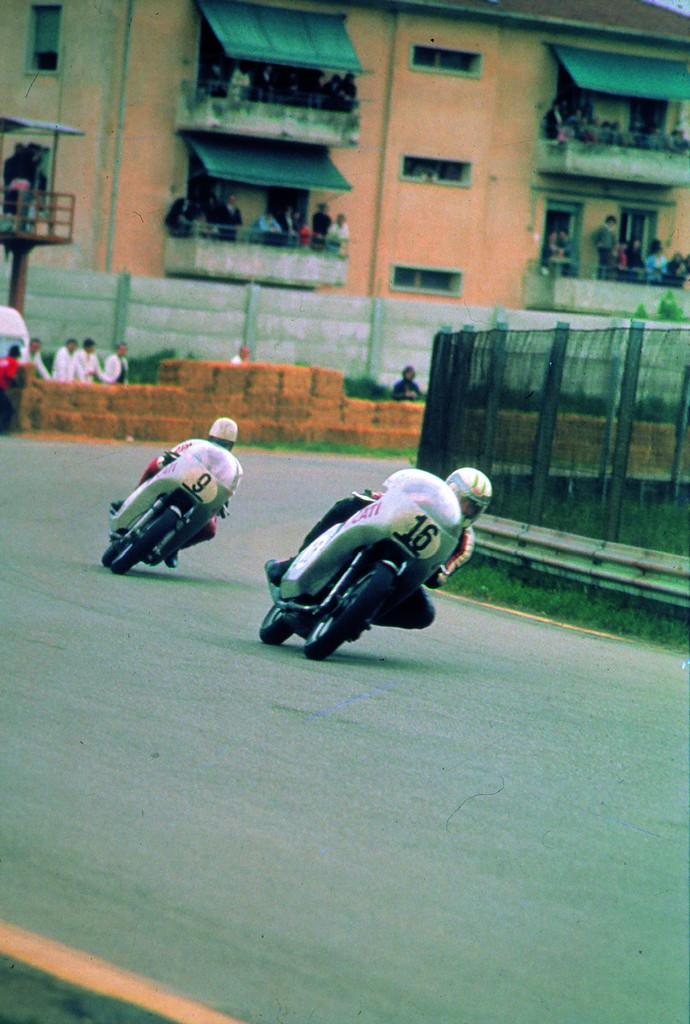
Paul Smart (No. 16) leads Ducati teammate Bruno Spaggiari (No. 9) in the inaugural Imola 200 race, 23 April 1972

The Imola 200 (also known as the 200 Miglia) is a 200-mile (320 km) motorcycle race held annually at Autodromo Enzo e Dino Ferrari of Imola, Italy. The race originally ran as a modern motorcycle race from 1972 to 1985. In 2010, the Imola 200 Miglia Revival began as a classic bike race.

== Background ==
In response to the popularity of the Daytona 200, it was decided to create a "European Daytona" with the best riders from the Grands Prix, European, American and Italian championships competing together.

== Inaugural race ==
The inaugural race was held in 1972, being won by Paul Smart. He was riding a Ducati 750 Imola Desmo. This bike is considered the first V-twin engine with desmodromic valve system for Ducati.

== Influence ==
This race was considered a major step in the notoriety of Ducati.

== Imola 200 race results ==
Season	Date	Race Results
1972	April 23	1) (United Kingdom) Paul Smart (Ducati); 2) (Italy) Bruno Spaggiari (Ducati); 3) (Italy) Walter Villa (Triumph)
1973	April 15	1) (Finland) Jarno Saarinen (Yamaha); 2) (Italy) Bruno Spaggiari (Ducati); 3) (Italy) Walter Villa (Kawasaki)
1974	April 7	1) (Italy) Giacomo Agostini (Yamaha); 2) (United States) Kenny Roberts (Yamaha); 3) (Finland) Teuvo Länsivuori (Yamaha)
1975	April 6	1) (Venezuela) Johnny Cecotto (Yamaha); 2) (France) Patrick Pons (Yamaha); 3) (United States) Steve Baker (Yamaha)
1976	April 4	1) (United States) Steve Baker (Yamaha); 2) (France) Michel Rougerie (Yamaha); 3) (United Kingdom) Barry Sheene (Suzuki)
1977	April 3	1) (United States) Kenny Roberts (Yamaha); 2) (United States) Steve Baker (Yamaha); 3) (Italy) Giacomo Agostini (Yamaha)
1978	April 2	1) (Venezuela) Johnny Cecotto (Yamaha); 2) (United States) Steve Baker (Yamaha); 3) (Italy) Giacomo Agostini (Yamaha)
1979		No race held
1980	April 13	1) (Venezuela) Johnny Cecotto (Yamaha); 2) (Italy) Marco Lucchinelli (Suzuki); 3) (United States) Kenny Roberts (Yamaha)
1981	April 4	1) (Italy) Marco Lucchinelli (Suzuki); 2) (United States) Kenny Roberts (Yamaha); 3) (Netherlands) Boet van Dulmen (Yamaha)
1982	April 4	1) (New Zealand) Graeme Crosby (Yamaha); 2) (Italy) Marco Lucchinelli (Honda); 3) (Italy) Graziano Rossi (Yamaha)
1983	April 10	1) (United States) Kenny Roberts (Yamaha); 2) (Italy) Franco Uncini (Suzuki); 3) (United States) Eddie Lawson (Yamaha)
1984	April 1	1) (United States) Kenny Roberts (Yamaha); 2) (Italy) Lorenzo Ghiselli (Suzuki); 3) (United Kingdom) Steve Williams (Yamaha)
1985	April 14	1) (United States) Eddie Lawson (Yamaha); 2) (United States) Randy Mamola (Honda); 3) (Japan) Takazumi Katayama (Honda)
