= Paul Smart (motorcyclist) =

British motorcycle racer (1943–2021)

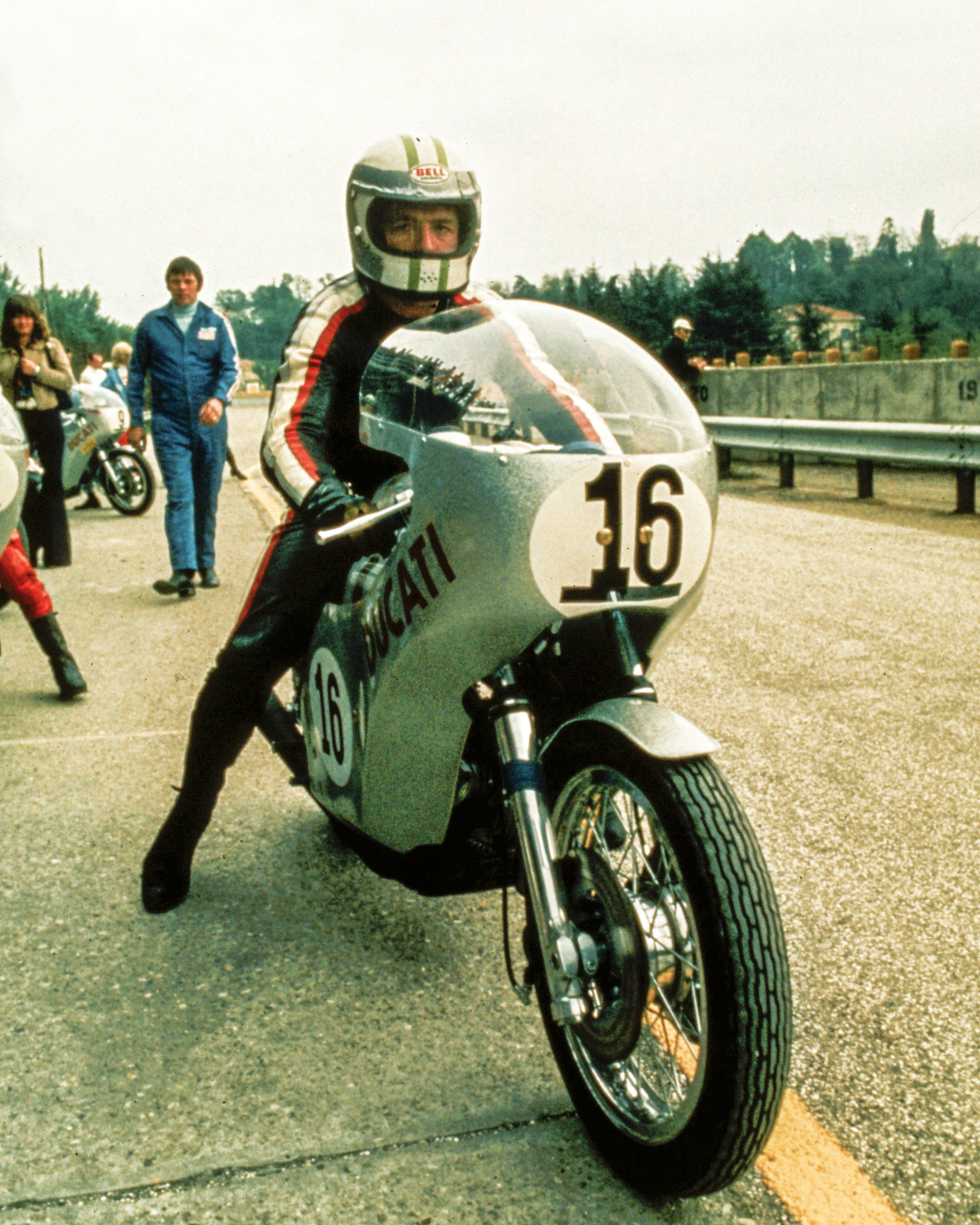
- Smart on Ducati 750 at the victorious 1972 Imola 200
- Born: 23 April 1943
- Died: 27 October 2021 (aged 78)
- Spouse: Maggie Sheene (m. 1971)
- Relatives: Scott Smart (son); Barry Sheene (brother-in-law)
Motorcycle racing career statistics
Grand Prix motorcycle racing
Active years	1970–1972
First race	1970 250cc Finnish Grand Prix
Last race	1972 500cc Nations Grand Prix
Starts / Wins / Podiums / Poles / F. laps / Points; 10 / 0 / 7 / 0 / 0 / 42

Paul Smart (23 April 1943 – 27 October 2021) was an English short circuit motorcycle road racer who later entered Grands Prix.

== Racing background ==
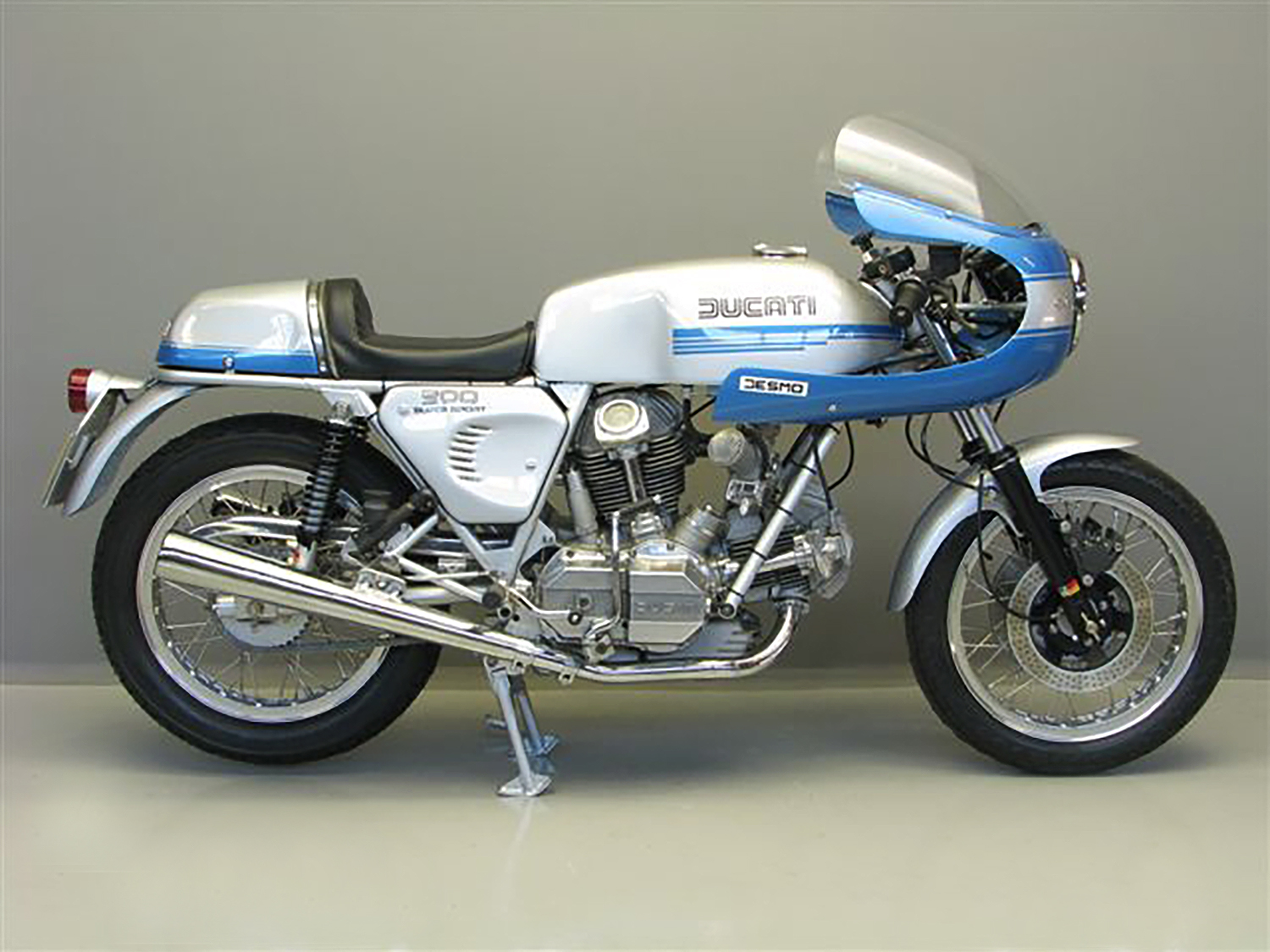
1977 Ducati 900SS

Smart started racing in the latter half of the 1960s after attending the Charles Mortimer Race School at Brands Hatch race circuit, Kent in 1965, initially buying a Bultaco which proved expensive and unreliable, and later riding a variety of machinery in different classes on UK short-circuits.

For 1966, Smart shared a 125 cc Honda with John Button whilst saving money to buy a 250 cc Cotton which he rode successfully at club level, eventually winning the MCN 250 cc Championship. After the Cotton engine failed, he was provided with a Greeves by Chas Mortimer.

Smart won the 250 cc class at the Stars of Tomorrow meeting at Mallory Park, England on 3 July 1966 riding a Greeves.

Smart first entered the Isle of Man Manx Grand Prix in September 1966 riding a Greeves Silverstone as used by the race school.

During 1967, Smart was sponsored by Charles Mortimer Senior, proprietor of the Charles Mortimer Race School based at Brands Hatch race circuit, Kent, riding from a stable consisting of RDS Greeves 250s, a Bultaco 125 and an Aermacchi 350 together with Chas Mortimer, Charles' son. Both were also employed as road race instructors at the race school.

At the Isle of Man TT Races on a 745 cc Dunstall Dominator for Paul Dunstall, Smart scored second place in 1967, and again second on a Norton Commando in 1969, both in the Production 750 cc class.

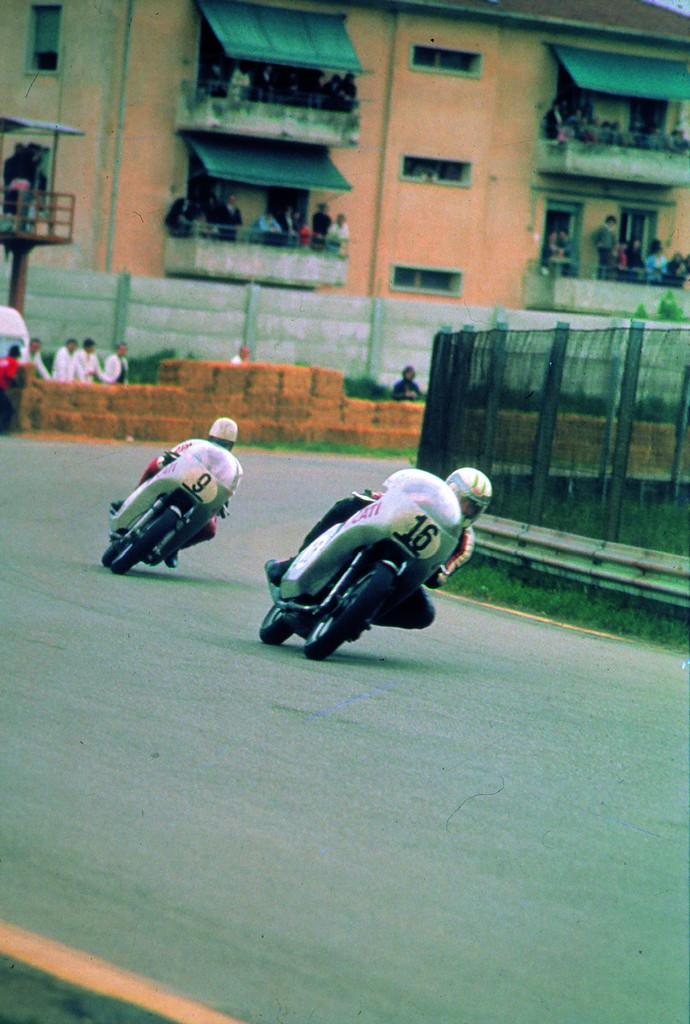
Smart (16) leads Ducati teammate Bruno Spaggiari (9) in the inaugural Imola 200 race (1972)

Smart moved on to regular successes during 1969 when he was sponsored by Joe Francis Motors, a London motorcycle dealer selling AMC, which provided a 750 cc Norton, a Seeley, a 250 cc Yamaha, and winning the Hutchinson 100 Production machine event on a Triumph 750 cc. For 1970 there was a works Triumph Trident 750 cc and his own 350 cc Yamaha.

In the Transatlantic Trophy Anglo-American Match Races in 1971, Smart rode a Triumph triple and was joint top scorer with Ray Pickrell in the winning UK team. In 1973 and 1974 he captained the UK winning team riding a works Suzuki 750 two-stroke triple.

Smart also raced in Grands Prix in the early 1970s, with second-place results in 1971 in both the 350cc and 250cc categories, riding Yamaha machinery.

The most prominent victory of Smart's career came on 23 April 1972 when he won the Imola 200 at age 29, riding Ducati's new 750 racer, based on the GT750 roadster. Ducati paid his airfare and £500 wages. His winnings were an additional £6,000. A 750SS road bike and production race version followed, turning into the 1975 900SS which continued until the early 1980s.

In 1972, Smart began competing for the Hansen Kawasaki team in the AMA road racing events in the United States riding the newly introduced Kawasaki H2R wearing the team's trademark neon lime green racing livery. He won what was stated to be the richest prize in motorcycling history – over £12,000 – in the 1972 Champion Spark Plug Classic held at the Ontario Motor Speedway on a Seeley-framed Kawasaki H2R.

Smart joined the Suzuki factory racing team in 1973 and won the British round of the 1973 Formula 750 season at the Silverstone Circuit riding a Suzuki TR750. He repeated his Silverstone victory the following year in the 1974 Formula 750 season.

== Personal life ==
Smart sitting on one of his modern replica Ducati PaulSmart 1000 LE roadgoing motorcycles

After making history for Ducati and winning further races, in 1978, Smart finally hung up his leathers and retired from competition to concentrate on his motorcycle business, which he expanded into three separate shops at one stage. He sold the shops and the family caravan park business in Kent, later qualifying as an offshore sailing skipper, formalising his long-time hobby.

In 2006, Ducati produced a 1000cc limited-edition PaulSmart 1000 LE, in recognition of the 1972 Imola win. It featured modern technology and design of its time, but had retro-styling resembling the 1972 race bike.

Smart married Barry Sheene’s sister Maggie in 1971. Son Scott is a former Grand Prix racer who won races in the British Superbike Championship then turned to Superstock, and is technical director of World Superbike Championship for the FIM.

Smart died in a road traffic collision in the afternoon of 27 October 2021, aged 78, while riding his motorcycle in East Sussex and Kent.
