= Ducati Road 350 =

SOHC motorcycle made by MotoTrans under licence from Ducati

- Manufacturer: Ducati/MotoTrans
- Production: 1973-1976
- Successor: Ducati Forza; Ducati Vento
- Class: Standard
- Engine: Air-cooled bevel drive SOHC single cylinder four stroke
- Bore / stroke: 76 mm × 75 mm (3.0 in × 3.0 in)
- Compression ratio: 10:1
- Top speed: 130 km/h (81 mph)
- Power: 29 bhp (22 kW) @ 7,000 rpm
- Transmission: Multiplate wet clutch, 5 speed
- Frame type: Single cradle
- Suspension: Front: telescopic forks Rear: swinging arm
- Brakes: Drum front & rear
- Tyres: Front: 325x18 Rear: 400x18
- Wheelbase: 1,320 mm (52 in)
- Weight: 122 kg (269 lb) (dry)
- Fuel capacity: 9 L (2.0 imp gal; 2.4 US gal)

The Ducati Road 350 is a 340 cc (21 cu in) single cylinder bevel drive SOHC motorcycle produced by the Spanish manufacturer MotoTrans, who were licensed by Ducati to produce motorcycles under the Ducati brand name and was produced from 1973 to 1976. The model was intended to be for the Spanish domestic market although it was also exported to the US in 1973.

== History ==
In post-Civil War Spain, the Franco regime banned the import of motorcycles and also forbade foreign nationals from settling in Spain, or stating a business there. MotoTrans was set up to manufacture Ducati motorcycles under licence in Barcelona in 1957.

The Road 250 was introduced in 1972 as a Spanish version of the 250 Scrambler and the 350 version introduced a year later in 1973. The 350 used the 'wide case' engine. A locally built Amal carburettor and Spanish Telesco front forks were fitted. The bike was finished in Black with a metallic burnt orange tank and mudguards and chrome headlight.

The American Ducati importers, Berliner Motor Corporation, were in dispute with the Italian factory over pricing from 1971 to '73 and chose to import from MotoTrans instead during this period. Amongst the models imported in '73 was the Road 350.

== Technical details ==
=== Engine and transmission ===
The single cylinder bevel drive OHC engine was of unit construction and had an alloy head and alloy barrel with cast iron liners. Bore and stroke were 76 mm × 75 mm (3.0 in × 3.0 in) giving a displacement of 340 cc (21 cu in). A 10:1 piston was fitted. Claimed power output was 29 bhp (22 kW) @ 7,000 rpm, giving the machine a top speed of 130 km/h (81 mph).

Fuel was delivered by a Spanish made 30 mm Amal Concentric carburettor. The engine used wet sump lubrication and ignition was by battery and coil.

Primary drive was by gears to a multi-plate wet clutch and 5 speed gearbox. Chain drive took power to the rear wheel.

=== Cycle parts ===
The single cradle frame used the engine as a stressed member. Rear suspension was by swinging arm with twin adjustable shock absorbers. At the front telescopic forks were fitted. Brakes were drums, the front being 180 mm (7.1 in) diameter and the rear 160 mm (6.3 in).
