= Ducati Scrambler (original) =

Italian single cylinder scrambler motorcycle

Ducati 450 Scrambler
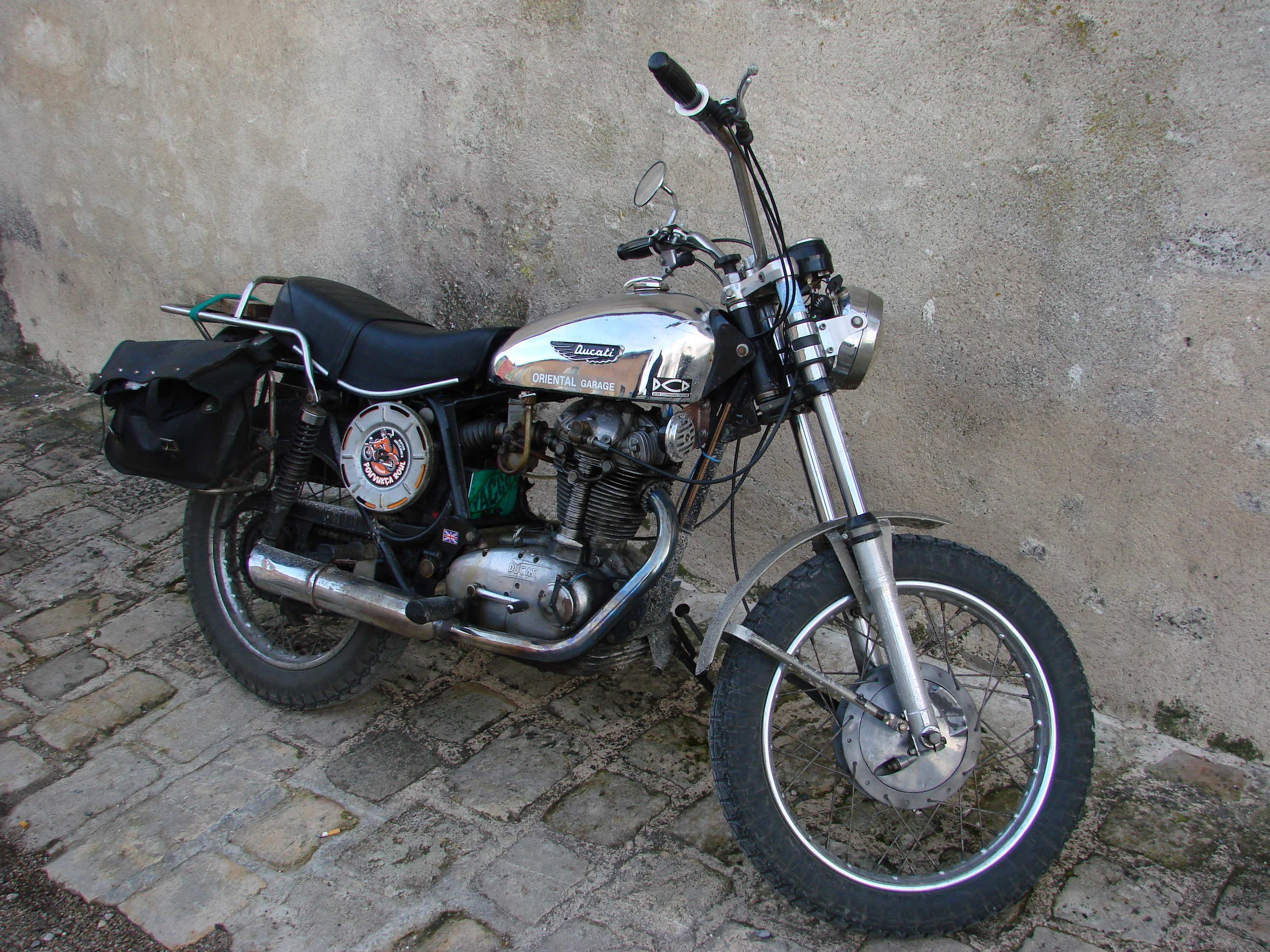
- Manufacturer: Ducati
- Production: 1962-1976
- Class: Scrambler
- Engine: 2-valve, 4-stroke, air-cooled, 340.2 cc single cylinder Bevel gear driven SOHC; Alloy cylinder head cast iron cylinder liner
- Bore / stroke: 76 mm×75 mm
- Compression ratio: 9.3:1
- Top speed: 130 km/h (81 mph)
- Power: 27 hp at 8,500 rpm
- Ignition type: Bosch electronic
- Transmission: 5-speed, wet clutch
- Frame type: Single-beam steel cradle
- Suspension: Front : Marzocchi telescopic 35 mm hydraulic fork Rear : Swingarm with Marzocchi shock, 3-position adjustable
- Brakes: Front: 180 mm drum with two shoes Rear: 160 mm drum with one shoe
- Tires: Front 3.50 x 18 in. Rear 4.00 x 18 in., Borrani spoked wheels
- Seat height: 770 mm
- Fuel capacity: 12.6 L (3.3 US gal) of which 1.6 L reserve
- Fuel consumption: 20 km/L (47 mpg_{‑US})
- Related: Ducati Scrambler (2015)

The Ducati Scrambler was the brand name for a series of single cylinder scrambler motorcycles made by Ducati for the American market from 1962 until 1974. Its creation is attributed to the American Berliner Motor Corporation. Models were produced in 250 cc through 450 cc displacements. The 450 variant was sold as the "Jupiter" in the United States.

The first Scramblers (1962–1967) were derived from street-legal models, and featured "narrow case" engines with lightly altered frames. It originally derived from a Ducati Diana road bike converted by Michael Berliner for dirt-track racing in America. These Scrambler models all had a maximum engine capacity of 250cc, and are generally referred to as "narrow case Scrambler(s)"

- Scrambler OHC 250 (1962–1963)
- Scrambler 250 (1964–1968)
- Scrambler 350 (1967–1968)

The second series used a wider engine case. Frames were modified with experience derived from Bruno Spaggiari's Ducati factory racing motorcycles.

- Scrambler 50 (1970–1971)
- Scrambler 125 (1970–1971)
- Scrambler 250 (1968–1975)
- Scrambler 350 (1968–1975)
- Scrambler 450 (1969–1976)
- R/T 350 (1971–1974)
- R/T 450 (1971–1974) (desmodromic valves)

== Revival ==
The Scrambler name is revived in 2015 as Ducati's modern-classic styled motorcycle.
