= Ducati 450 Scrambler =

SOHC motorcycle by Ducati

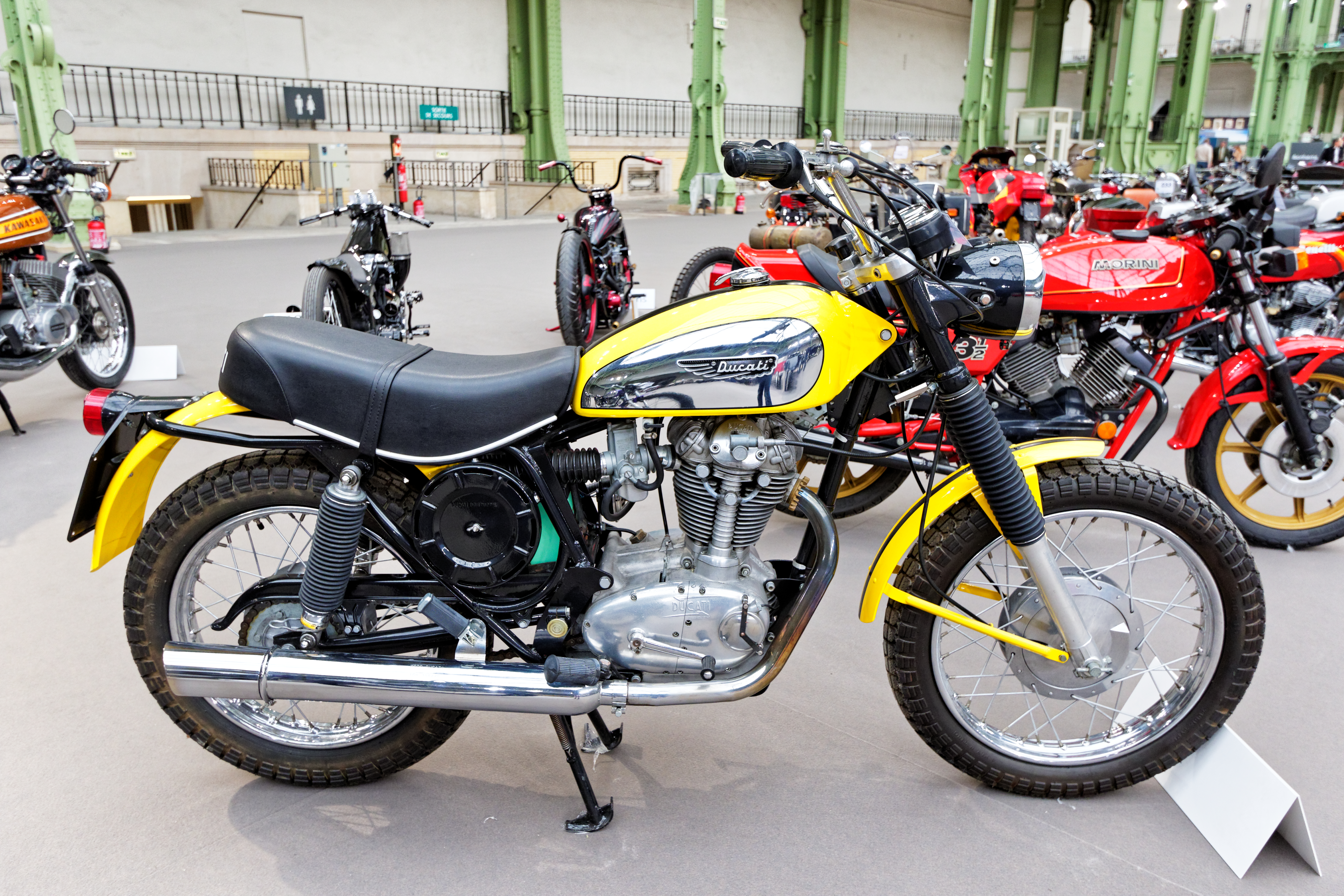
- 1972 Ducati 450 Scrambler
- Manufacturer: Ducati
- Also called: Ducati 450 Jupiter; Ducati 450 SCR
- Production: 1969-1974
- Class: On/off-road
- Engine: 435.66 cc (26.586 cu in) Air-cooled bevel drive SOHC single cylinder four stroke
- Bore / stroke: 86 mm × 75 mm (3.4 in × 3.0 in)
- Compression ratio: 9.3:1
- Top speed: 135 km/h (84 mph)
- Power: 27 bhp (20 kW) @ 7,000 rpm
- Transmission: Multiplate wet clutch, 5 speed
- Frame type: Single cradle
- Suspension: Front: telescopic forks Rear: swinging arm
- Brakes: Drum front & rear
- Tyres: Front: 350x19 Rear: 400x18
- Wheelbase: 1,380 mm (54 in)
- Dimensions: L: 2,120 mm (83 in); W: 940 mm (37 in); H: 1,150 mm (45 in)
- Seat height: 770 mm (30 in)
- Weight: 140 kg (310 lb) (dry)
- Fuel capacity: 11 L (2.4 imp gal; 2.9 US gal)

The Ducati 450 Scrambler, also known in the US as the Ducati Jupiter and in Europe as the Ducati 450 SCR is an on/off-road 436 cc (26.6 cu in) single cylinder bevel drive SOHC motorcycle produced by the Italian manufacturer Ducati from 1969 to 1974. Total production was around 11,000 machines.

The model was also produced under licence in Spain by MotoTrans.

== History ==
In 1968 the global market for dirt bikes was large. Ducati was already producing 250 and 350 Scramblers but the American importers, Berliner Motor Corporation requested a larger-engined version to compete against the BSA 441 Victor. The 450 Scrambler was introduced in 1969, and was the first model to use the 436 cc engine, which was the largest displacement possible that the OHC engine could be stretched to. The frame, the design of which used input from the racing department, was a strengthened version of that used on the smaller scramblers with gussets along the top tube.

The 450 was successfully used in flat track, enduro and scrambles racing.

In 1973 the model gained electronic ignition, a double-sided front brake and the lights and instruments used on the Mark 3.

The factory ceased production of OHC singles in 1974. The remaining stocks were purchased by the then British importer Coburn & Hughes, who continued to sell them until early 1976. Amongst these bikes were some 450 Scramblers which were marketed as Mark 4, a reference to the Mark 3 roadsters.

== Technical details ==
=== Engine and transmission ===
The single cylinder bevel drive OHC engine was of a vertically spilt unit construction and had alloy head and alloy barrels with austenitic liners. Ball bearings were used in the main bearings and roller bearings for the big end. Hairspring valve springs were used to close the valves. Bore and stroke were 85 mm × 75 mm (3.3 in × 3.0 in) giving a displacement of 436 cc (26.6 cu in). Compression ratio was 9.3:1 and claimed power output was 27 bhp (20 kW) @ 7,000 rpm.

Fuel was supplied by a 29mm square-slide Dell'Orto VHB carburettor. Wet sump lubrication was used and ignition was by battery and coil until 1973 when Electronic ignition was fitted.

Primary drive was by helical gears to a multi-plate wet clutch to a 5 speed gearbox. Chain drive took power to the rear wheel, and was wider than the chain used on other models.

=== Cycle parts ===
The single cradle frame used the engine as a stressed member, and had strengthening gussets on the top tube. Rear suspension was by swinging arm with twin 3-way adjustable Marzocchi shock absorbers. At the front 35 mm (1.4 in) Marzocchi telescopic forks were fitted. Brakes were drums, the front being 180 mm (7.1 in) diameter front and 160 mm (6.3 in) rear. A double-sided front brake was fitted from 1973. Wire wheels with alloy rims were fitted with 350x19 front and 400x18 rear tyres.
