= Ducati Road 250 =

SOHC motorcycle made by MotoTrans under licence from Ducati

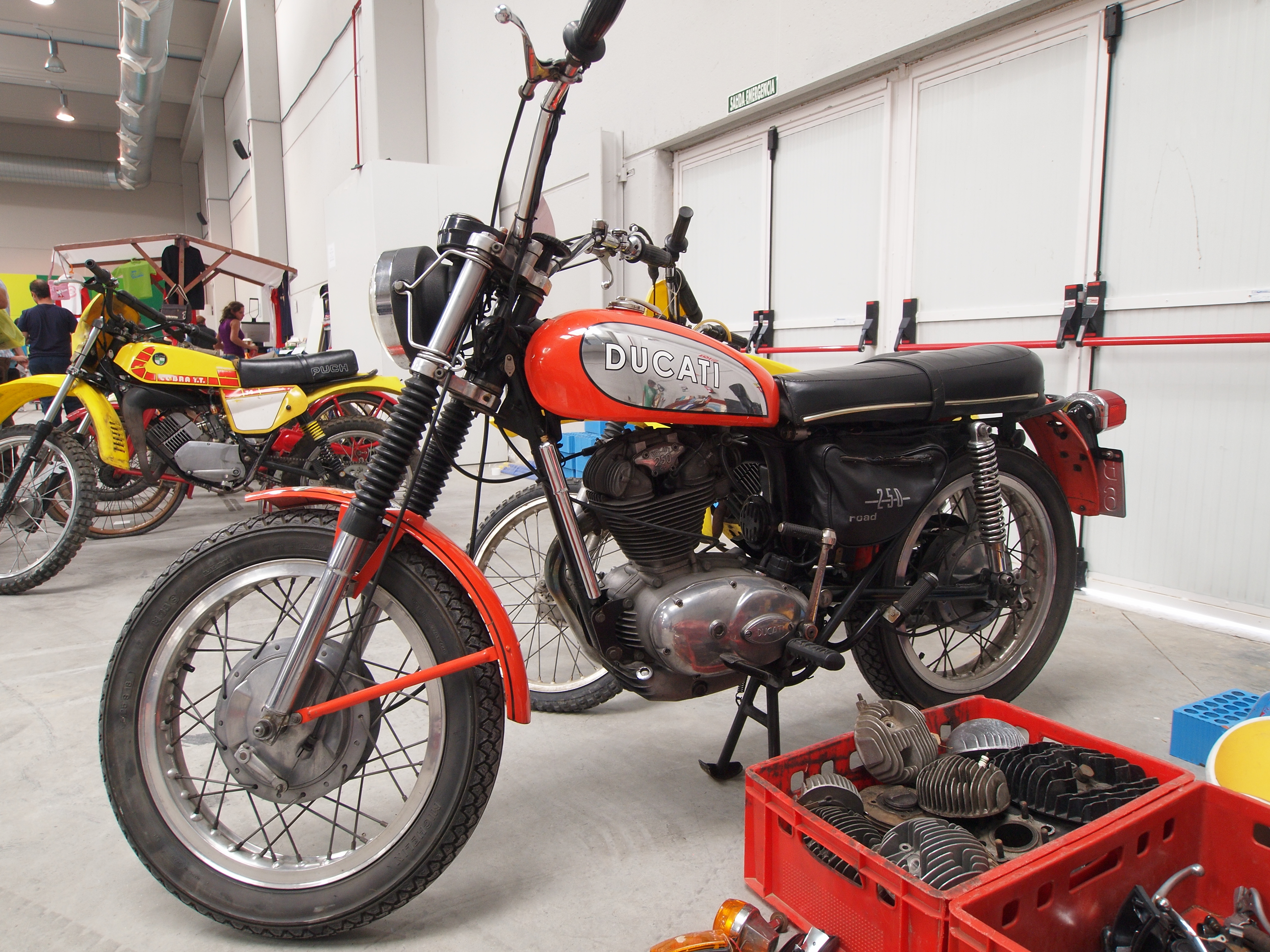
- Ducati Road 250
- Manufacturer: Ducati/MotoTrans
- Production: 1972-1977
- Successor: Ducati Strada
- Class: Standard
- Engine: Air-cooled bevel drive SOHC single cylinder four stroke
- Bore / stroke: 69 mm × 66 mm (2.7 in × 2.6 in)
- Compression ratio: 10:1
- Top speed: 125 km/h (78 mph)
- Power: 25 bhp (19 kW) @ 9,000 rpm
- Transmission: Multiplate wet clutch, 5 speed
- Frame type: Single cradle
- Suspension: Front: telescopic forks Rear: swinging arm
- Brakes: Drum front & rear
- Tyres: Front: 325x18 Rear: 400x18
- Wheelbase: 1,320 mm (52 in)
- Weight: 122 kg (269 lb) (dry)
- Fuel capacity: 9 L (2.0 imp gal; 2.4 US gal)

The Ducati Road 250 is a 247 cc (15.1 cu in) single cylinder bevel drive SOHC motorcycle produced by the Spanish manufacturer MotoTrans, who were licensed by Ducati to produce motorcycles under the Ducati brand name and was produced from 1972 to 1977. The model was intended to be a Spanish domestic market version of the 250 Scrambler, although it was also exported to the US in 1972/3.

== History ==
In post-Civil War Spain, the Franco regime banned the import of motorcycles and also forbade foreign nationals from settling in Spain, or stating a business there. MotoTrans was set up to manufacture Ducati motorcycles under licence in Barcelona in 1957.

The Road was introduced in 1972 as a Spanish version of the 250 Scrambler. However, the model used the longer stroke 'narrow case' engine of the 24 Horas rather than the 'wide case' engine of the Scrambler. A locally built Amal carburettor and Spanish Telesco front forks were fitted. The bike was finished in Black with a metallic burnt orange tank and mudguards and chrome headlight.

The American Ducati importers, Berliner Motor Corporation, were in dispute with the Italian factory over pricing from 1971 to '73 and chose to import from MotoTrans instead during this period. Amongst the models imported in '72 - '73 was the Road 250.

=== Road 250 77 ===
An updated version, the Road 250 77, was introduced in 1977. Electrics were uprated to 12 volts and stainless steel mudguards were fitted. The instrument panel from the 500 twins were also fitted.

== Technical details ==
=== Engine and transmission ===
The single cylinder bevel drive OHC engine was of unit construction and had an alloy head and alloy barrel with cast iron liners. Bore and stroke were 69 mm × 66 mm (2.7 in × 2.6 in) giving a displacement of 247 cc (15.1 cu in). A 10:1 piston was fitted. Claimed power output was 25 bhp (19 kW) @ 9,000 rpm, giving the machine a top speed of 125 km/h (78 mph).

Fuel was delivered by a Spanish made Amal Monobloc 375/27 carburettor. This was later updated to a Concentric. The engine used wet sump lubrication and ignition was by battery and coil.

Primary drive was by gears to a multi-plate wet clutch and 5 speed gearbox. Chain drive took power to the rear wheel.

=== Cycle parts ===
The single cradle frame used the engine as a stressed member. Rear suspension was by swinging arm with twin adjustable shock absorbers. At the front telescopic forks were fitted. Brakes were drums, the front being 180 mm (7.1 in) diameter and the rear 160 mm (6.3 in).
