= Ducati Strada =

SOHC motorcycle made by MotoTrans under licence from Ducati

- Manufacturer: Ducati/MotoTrans
- Production: 1978-1983
- Predecessor: Ducati Road 250
- Class: Standard
- Engine: Air-cooled bevel drive SOHC single cylinder four stroke
- Bore / stroke: 74 mm × 57.8 mm (2.91 in × 2.28 in)
- Compression ratio: 9:1
- Top speed: 125 km/h (78 mph)
- Power: 21 bhp (16 kW) @ 8,000 rpm
- Transmission: Multiplate wet clutch, 5 speed
- Frame type: Single cradle
- Suspension: Front: telescopic forks Rear: swinging arm
- Brakes: Drum front & rear (series 1); Disc front (series 2 & 3)
- Tyres: Front: 325x18 Rear: 350x18
- Wheelbase: 1,370 mm (54 in)
- Weight: 135 kg (298 lb) (dry)
- Fuel capacity: 15.5 L (3.4 imp gal; 4.1 US gal)

The Ducati Strada is a 249 cc (15.2 cu in) single cylinder bevel drive SOHC motorcycle produced by the Spanish manufacturer MotoTrans, who were licensed by Ducati to produce motorcycles under the Ducati brand name and was produced from 1978 to 1983. The model is based on the 250 'wide case' Ducati singles which the Italian Ducati factory had stopped manufacturing in 1974, but which MotoTrans continued to develop and produce.

== Model history ==
=== 1st series ===
Introduced in 1978 as a replacement for the Road 250, the Strada shared the same styling as the Forza. It used the same frame as the 500 twins and was fitted with drum brakes front and rear. Electrics were 12v. The bike was finished in metallic blue with chrome headlight and mudguards and a black frame.

=== 2nd series ===
The Strada was fitted with a front disc brake for the 2nd series and was finished in the same orange as the 2nd series Forza.

=== 3rd series ===
The Strada was fitted with the cycle parts of the 500 twins for the 3rd series, introduced in 1980.

== Technical details ==
=== Engine and transmission ===
The single cylinder bevel drive OHC engine was of unit construction and had an alloy head and alloy barrel with cast iron liners. Bore and stroke were 74 mm × 57.8 mm (2.91 in × 2.28 in) giving a displacement of 247 cc (15.1 cu in). A 9:1 piston was fitted. Claimed power output was 21 bhp (16 kW) @ 8,000 rpm, giving the machine a top speed of 125 km/h (78 mph).

Fuel was delivered by a Spanish made Amal Concentric 627/27 carburettor. The engine used wet sump lubrication and ignition was by battery and coil.

Primary drive was by gears to a multi-plate wet clutch and 5 speed gearbox. Chain drive took power to the rear wheel.

=== Cycle parts ===
The single cradle frame of the 500 twins was used on the Strada. Rear suspension was by swinging arm with twin adjustable shock absorbers. At the front telescopic forks were fitted. Brakes on the 1st series were drums, the front being 180 mm (7.1 in) diameter and the rear 160 mm (6.3 in). A front disc brake was fitted on the 2nd and 3rd series.
