= Ducati Vento =

SOHC motorcycle made by MotoTrans under licence from Ducati

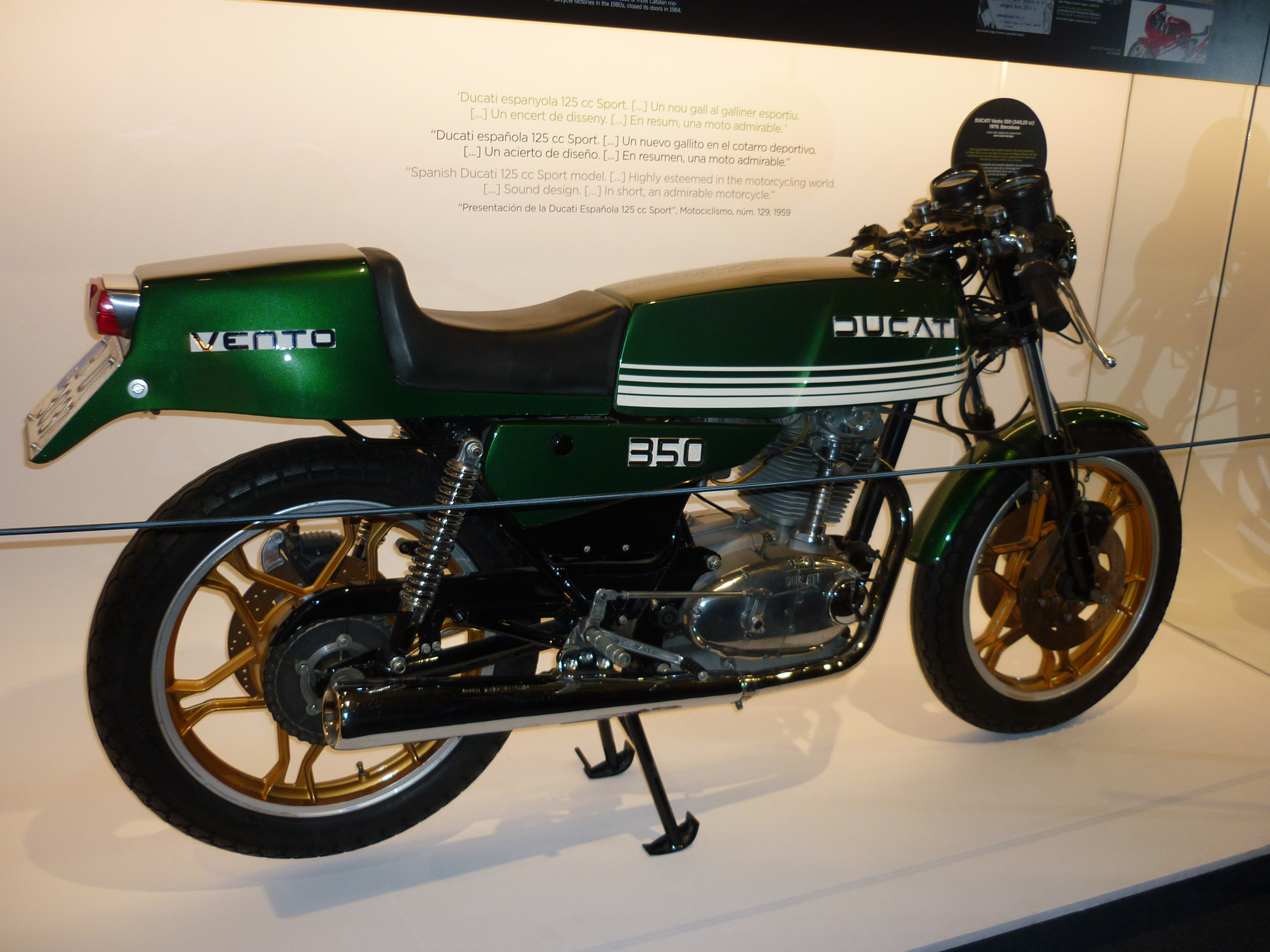
- 1979 Ducati Vento
- Manufacturer: Ducati/MotoTrans
- Production: 1976-1983
- Class: Café racer
- Engine: Air-cooled bevel drive SOHC single cylinder four stroke
- Bore / stroke: 76 mm × 75 mm (3.0 in × 3.0 in)
- Compression ratio: 10:1
- Top speed: 168 km/h (104 mph)
- Power: 28 bhp (21 kW) @ 8,000 rpm
- Transmission: Multiplate wet clutch, 5 speed
- Frame type: Single cradle
- Suspension: Front: telescopic forks Rear: swinging arm
- Brakes: Dual discs front Single disc rear
- Tyres: Front: 325x18 Rear: 350x18
- Wheelbase: 1,370 mm (54 in)
- Weight: 134 kg (295 lb) (dry)
- Fuel capacity: 16 L (3.5 imp gal; 4.2 US gal)

The Ducati Vento is a 340 cc (21 cu in) single cylinder bevel drive SOHC motorcycle produced by the Spanish manufacturer MotoTrans, who were licensed by Ducati to produce motorcycles under the Ducati brand name and was produced from 1978 to 1983. The model is based on the 350 'wide case' Ducati singles which the Italian Ducati factory had stopped manufacturing in 1974, but which MotoTrans continued to develop and produce. The machine had café racer styling and was intended to be a successor to the earlier 24 Horas.

== Model history ==
A prototype was shown at the 1974 Automobile Barcelona Show alongside the touring Forza. The prototype had a single front disc brake and wire wheels.

A second prototype was later shown with twin front discs and cast wheels.

The machine went into production in 1976 with a redesigned frame. A racing seat, clip-ons and rearsets were fitted. Compression ratio was increased to 10:1 and a 32mm Dell'Orto PHF carburettor fitted, which raised engine power to 28 bhp (21 kW). To save weight, the electric starter used on the Forza was not fitted. Most of the machines were finished in green, but some later machines were finished in red. They were sold mainly in the Spanish Market.

Production was suspended in late 1981 due to MotoTrans being in financial trouble, but resumed in the Summer of 1982. The next year, 1983, production stopped when the company went into receivership.

== Technical details ==
=== Engine and transmission ===
The single cylinder bevel drive OHC engine was of unit construction and had an alloy head and alloy barrel with cast iron liners. Bore and stroke were 76 mm × 75 mm (3.0 in × 3.0 in) giving a displacement of 340 cc (21 cu in). A 10:1 piston was fitted. Claimed power output was 28 bhp (21 kW) @ 8,000 rpm, giving the machine a top speed of 165 km/h (103 mph).

Fuel was delivered by a 32mm Dell'Orto PHF carburettor. The engine used wet sump lubrication and ignition was by battery and coil.

Primary drive was by gears to a multi-plate wet clutch and 5 speed gearbox. Chain drive took power to the rear wheel.

=== Cycle parts ===
A single cradle frame was used. Rear suspension was by swinging arm with twin adjustable Telesco Hydrobag gas shock absorbers. At the front Telesco telescopic forks were fitted. Twin Brembo 260 mm (10 in) diameter disc brakes were fitted on the front and a single Brembo disc of the same size on the rear.

Michelin sports tyres were fitted, 325x18 front and 350x18 rear, on six spoke cast alloy wheels.
