= Ducati Scrambler =

Ducati Scrambler may refer to:

- Ducati Scrambler (original), a series of motorcycles manufactured from 1962 to 1974
- Ducati Scrambler (2015)
