= Scrambler (disambiguation) =

A scrambler is a telecommunications device that transposes or inverts signals or otherwise encodes a message.

Scrambler may also refer to:

== Automobiles ==
- CJ-8 Scrambler, a Jeep CJ variant produced from 1978 to 1983
- SC/Rambler, a muscle car made by American Motors in 1969

== Motorcycles ==
- Scrambler (motorcycle), for motocross racing
- Triumph Scrambler, a model introduced in 2006
- Ducati Scrambler (original), a model originally built in 1962-1974
- Ducati Scrambler (2015), reintroduced in 2015

== Other ==
- Scrambler (ride), a type of amusement ride
- Scrambler mouse, a mouse mutant lacking a functional DAB1 gene
- Scrambler (comics), a character in Marvel Comics

== See also ==
- Scramble (disambiguation)
