= Ducati 350 Scrambler =

SOHC motorcycle by Ducati

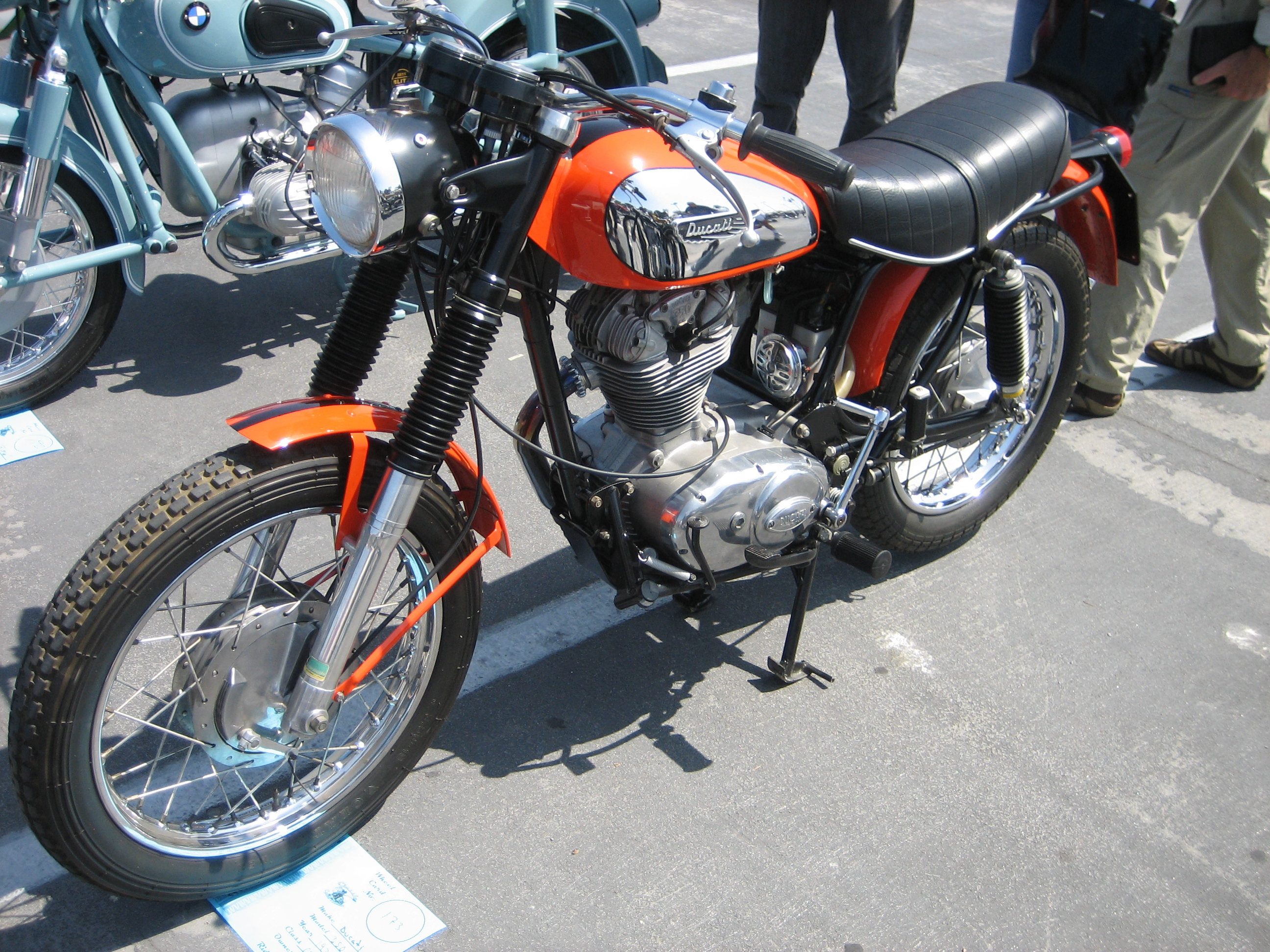
- 1972 Ducati 350 Scrambler
- Manufacturer: Ducati
- Also called: Ducati 350 SS; Ducati 350 SCR
- Production: 1968-1974
- Class: On/off-road
- Engine: 340.2 cc (20.76 cu in) Air-cooled bevel drive SOHC single cylinder four stroke
- Bore / stroke: 76 mm × 75 mm (3.0 in × 3.0 in)
- Compression ratio: 9.5:1
- Top speed: 130 km/h (81 mph)
- Power: 24 bhp (18 kW) @ 8,500 rpm
- Transmission: Multiplate wet clutch, 5 speed
- Frame type: Single cradle
- Suspension: Front: telescopic forks Rear: swinging arm
- Brakes: Drum front & rear
- Tyres: Front: 350x19 Rear: 400x18
- Wheelbase: 1,330 mm (52 in)
- Dimensions: L: 2,120 mm (83 in); W: 940 mm (37 in)
- Seat height: 770 mm (30 in)
- Weight: 139 kg (306 lb) (dry)
- Fuel capacity: 11 L (2.4 imp gal; 2.9 US gal)

The Ducati 350 Scrambler, also known in the US as the Ducati 350 SS and in Europe as the Ducati 350 SCR is an on/off-road 340 cc (21 cu in) single cylinder bevel drive SOHC motorcycle produced by the Italian manufacturer Ducati from 1968 to 1974. It was the first of the 'wide case' Ducati singles produced and aimed at the American Market. Total production was around 11,500 machines.

The model was also produced under licence in Spain by MotoTrans from 1974 to 1976.

== History ==
Although some 350 Scramblers may have been produced in 1967 by fitting the 'narrow case' Sebring engine into 250 Scrambler, the model wasn't officially introduced until May 1968. It was the first model to use the improved wide case engine that was based on the 250SCD and 350SCD (Sport Corsa Desmo) racing engines.

A hotter camshaft was fitted in 1969 along with a square-slide Dell'Orto carburettor.

Few 350s were imported to the US and UK during 1970–71 as the importers (Berliner in the US and Vic Camp in the UK) were in dispute with the factory over prices.

Some of the last of the model made in 1974 used Spanish engines from MotoTrans. The factory ceased production of OHC singles in 1974. The remaining stocks were purchased by the then British importer Coburn & Hughes, who continued to sell them until early 1976.

== Technical details ==
=== Engine and transmission ===
The single cylinder bevel drive OHC engine was of a vertically spilt unit construction and had alloy head and alloy barrels with austenitic liners. Ball bearings were used in the main bearings and roller bearings for the big end. Hairspring valve springs were used to close the valves. Bore and stroke were 76 mm × 75 mm (3.0 in × 3.0 in) giving a displacement of 340 cc (21 cu in). A high compression 9.5:1 piston was fitted. Claimed power output was 24 bhp (18 kW) @ 8,500 rpm, giving the machine a top speed of 130 km/h (81 mph). The kickstart mechanism has been upgraded from the earlier models and a decompression lever fitted to non-desmo models to aid kicking the engine over.

Fuel was supplied by a 29mm Dell'Orto SSI carburettor. A square-slide Dell'Orto VHB carb was fitted from 1969. Wet sump lubrication was used and ignition was by battery and coil.

Primary drive was by helical gears to a multi-plate wet clutch to a 4 speed gearbox. Chain drive took power to the rear wheel.

=== Cycle parts ===
The single cradle frame was a strengthened version of the 'narrow case' bikes and used the engine as a stressed member. Rear suspension was by swinging arm with twin 3-way adjustable Marzocchi shock absorbers. At the front 31.5 mm (1.24 in) telescopic forks were fitted. Brakes were drums, the front being 180 mm (7.1 in) diameter front and 160 mm (6.3 in) rear.
