= Ducati 125 Scrambler =

SOHC motorcycle by Ducati

Ducati 125 Scramber
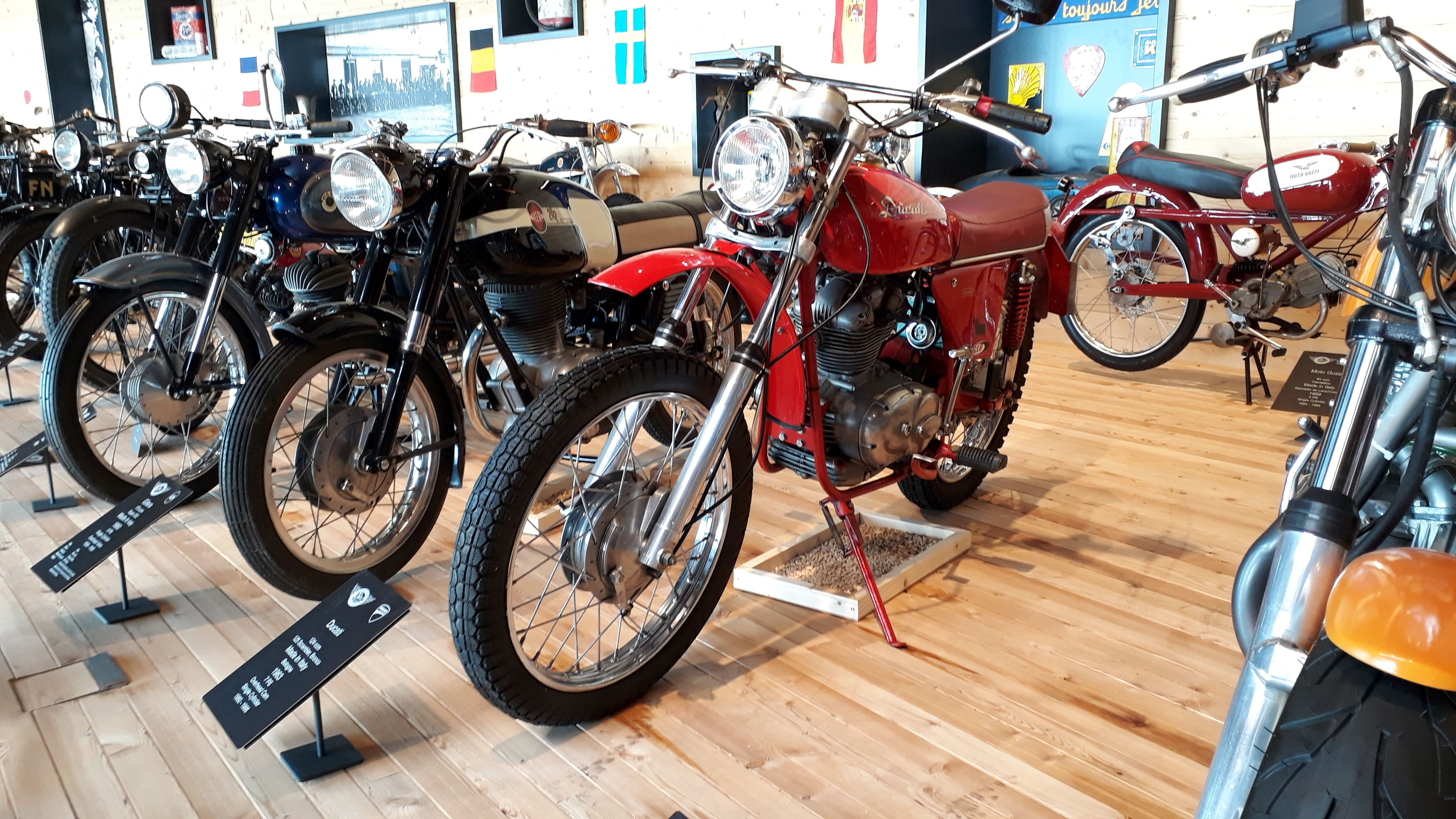
- Manufacturer: Ducati
- Production: 1971-1972
- Class: On/off-road
- Engine: 124.4 cc (7.59 cu in) Air-cooled bevel drive SOHC single cylinder four stroke
- Bore / stroke: 55.2 mm × 52 mm (2.17 in × 2.05 in)
- Compression ratio: 8.5:1
- Top speed: 90 km/h (56 mph)
- Power: 10 bhp (7.5 kW) @ 8,000 rpm
- Transmission: Multiplate wet clutch, 5 speed
- Frame type: Full duplex cradle
- Suspension: Front: telescopic forks Rear: swinging arm
- Brakes: Drum front & rear
- Tyres: Front: 250x19 Rear: 350x18
- Wheelbase: 1,340 mm (53 in)
- Dimensions: L: 2,040 mm (80 in); W: 860 mm (34 in)
- Seat height: 850 mm (33 in)
- Weight: 105 kg (231 lb) (dry)

The Ducati 125 Scrambler is an on/off-road 124 cc (7.6 cu in) single cylinder bevel drive SOHC motorcycle produced by the Italian manufacturer Ducati in 1971 and 1972. Although Ducati had stopped production of the 'narrow case' singles in 1967, the Scrambler used a narrow case engine made by MotoTrans in Spain. The model was not a sales success with less than 200 sold worldwide and was soon taken out of production.

== Technical details ==
=== Engine and transmission ===
The Ducati OHC singles had been designed by Fabio Taglioni. The initial engines, known as 'narrow case', were superseded by the improved 'wide case' engines in 1967, although the narrow case engines continued to be manufactured by MotoTrans in Spain. The smallest wide case engine was 250 cc and the new 125 Scrambler was fitted with a Spanish made engine. The single cylinder bevel drive OHC engine was of a vertically spilt unit construction and had alloy head and alloy barrels with austenitic liners. Ball bearings were used in the main bearings and roller bearings for the big end. Hairspring valve springs were used to close the valves. Bore and stroke were 55.2 mm × 52 mm (2.17 in × 2.05 in) giving a displacement of 124 cc (7.6 cu in). Compression ratio was 8.5:1. and claimed power output was 10 bhp (7.5 kW) @ 8,000 rpm, giving a top speed of 90 km/h (56 mph).

Fuel was delivered by a 20 mm Spanish built Amal Monobloc carburettor. Wet sump lubrication was used and ignition was by battery and coil.

Primary drive was by helical gears to a multi-plate wet clutch to a 5 speed gearbox. Chain drive took power to the rear wheel.

=== Cycle parts ===
Unlike other OHC models, the 125 Scrambler used a full duplex cradle frame. Rear suspension was by swinging arm with twin Marzocchi shock absorbers. At the front Marzocchi telescopic forks were fitted. Brakes were drums, the front being 158 mm (6.2 in) diameter front and 136 mm (5.4 in) rear. Wire wheels were fitted with a 250x19 tyre front and 350x18 rear.
