= Ducati 100 Scrambler =

Two stroke motorcycle by Ducati

- Manufacturer: Ducati
- Production: 1970-1971
- Class: On/off road
- Engine: 98 cc (6.0 cu in) single cylinder Air-cooled two stroke
- Bore / stroke: 52 mm × 46 mm (2.0 in × 1.8 in)
- Compression ratio: 11.2:1
- Top speed: 100 km/h (62 mph)
- Power: 6.27 bhp (4.68 kW) @ 6,000 rpm
- Transmission: Multiplate wet clutch, 4 speed
- Frame type: Duplex cradle
- Suspension: Front: telescopic forks Rear: swinging arm
- Brakes: Drum front & rear
- Tyres: Front: 250x18 Rear: 250x17
- Wheelbase: 1,180 mm (46 in)
- Dimensions: L: 1,840 mm (72 in); W: 800 mm (31 in)
- Seat height: 730 mm (29 in)
- Weight: 67 kg (148 lb) (dry)

The Ducati 100 Scrambler is an on/off-road 98 cc (6.0 cu in) single cylinder two stroke motorcycle produced by the Italian manufacturer Ducati in 1970 and 1971. The model was produced to take advantage of the dirt bike craze in Italy at the time. The model used many parts from existing models, keeping R&D costs down. A smaller engined version, the 50 Scrambler, was also produced. The model did not sell well and was soon dropped.

== Technical details ==
=== Engine and transmission ===
The engine of the Scrambler was taken from the Mountaineer. It was a piston ported two stroke of unit construction and had an alloy head and alloy barrel with a chrome-plated bore. Bore and stroke were 52 mm × 46 mm (2.0 in × 1.8 in) giving a displacement of 98 cc (6.0 cu in). Compression ratio was 11.2:1 and claimed power output was 6.27 bhp (4.68 kW) @ 6,000 rpm.

Fuel was delivered by a 24 mm Dell'Orto UBF carburettor and ignition was by flywheel magneto. Petrol/oil mix provided lubrication.

Primary drive was by helical gears to a multi-plate wet clutch and a 4 speed gearbox. Chain drive took power to the rear wheel.

=== Cycle parts ===
The duplex frame was the same as that used on the Cadet and SL models. Rear suspension was by swinging arm with twin Marzocchi shock absorbers. At the front Ceriani pattern Marzocchi telescopic forks were fitted. Brakes were 118 mm (4.6 in) diameter drums front and rear. The bike had a high level exhaust and was finished in yellow and black.
