= Scramble =

Scramble, Scrambled, or Scrambling may refer to:

== Arts and entertainment ==
=== Film and television ===
- Scramble (film), a 1970 British children's sports drama
- Scrambled (film), a 2023 American comedy-drama
- Scrambled!, a British children's TV programme 2014–2021
- "Scrambled" (Law & Order), a 1998 TV episode

=== Music ===
- Scramble (album), by the Coathangers, 2009
- Scrambles (album), by Bomb the Music Industry!, 2009
- "Scramble" (song), by Yui Horie; opening theme of the anime series School Rumble, 2004

=== Other media ===
- Scramble (comics), a Marvel Comics supervillain
- Scramble (video game), a 1981 arcade game
- Scramble (play-by-mail game)

== Codes and language ==
- Scrambler, in telecommunications, a device that encodes a message at the transmitter to make the message unintelligible
- Scrambling (linguistics), variation of word order

== Sports ==
- Scramble (golf), a team play format in golf
- Scrambling, a method of ascending rocky faces and ridges
- Motorcycle scrambling, or motocross, a form of motorcycle or all-terrain vehicle racing
- Quarterback scramble, an impromptu run in gridiron football

== Other uses ==
- Scramble (slave auction), an 18th-century form of slave auction
- Scrambling (military), rapid deployment of aircraft
- The Scramble, in the American National Residency Matching Program, a former process for medical students who did not obtain a match
- Pedestrian scramble, a pedestrian crossing system
- Scramble for Africa, European colonisation of Africa in the late-19th and early-20th centuries

== See also ==
- Scrambled eggs, a dish made from the lightly beaten combined egg whites and yolks
- Iskrambol (also known as scramble or ice scramble), a Filipino food dessert
- Scrambler (disambiguation)
- Scrabble (disambiguation)
