= Ducati Forza =

SOHC motorcycle made by MotoTrans under licence from Ducati

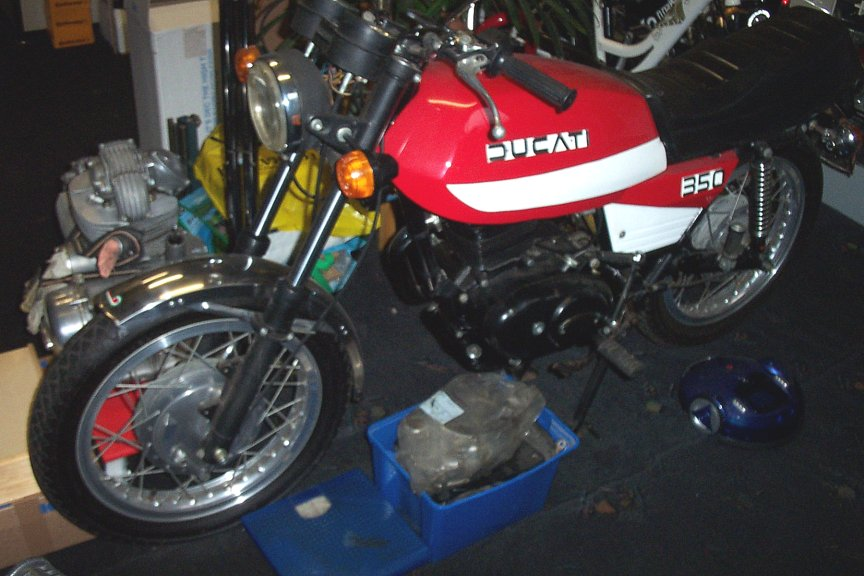
- Series 1 Ducati Forza
- Manufacturer: Ducati/MotoTrans
- Production: 1976-1983
- Predecessor: Ducati Road 350
- Class: Standard
- Engine: Air-cooled bevel drive SOHC single cylinder four stroke
- Bore / stroke: 76 mm × 75 mm (3.0 in × 3.0 in)
- Compression ratio: 9:1
- Top speed: 145 km/h (90 mph)
- Power: 22 bhp (16 kW) @ 8,000 rpm
- Transmission: Multiplate wet clutch, 5 speed
- Frame type: Single cradle
- Suspension: Front: telescopic forks Rear: swinging arm
- Brakes: Disc front Drum rear (series 1), disc rear (series 2)
- Tyres: Front: 325x18 Rear: 350x18
- Wheelbase: 1,370 mm (54 in)
- Weight: 148 kg (326 lb) (dry)
- Fuel capacity: 13 L (2.9 imp gal; 3.4 US gal)

The Ducati Forza is a 340 cc (21 cu in) single cylinder bevel drive SOHC motorcycle produced by the Spanish manufacturer MotoTrans, who were licensed by Ducati to produce motorcycles under the Ducati brand name and was produced from 1976 to 1983. The model is based on the 350 'wide case' Ducati singles which the Italian Ducati factory had stopped manufacturing in 1974, but which MotoTrans continued to develop and produce.

== Model history ==
A prototype was shown at the 1974 Automobile Barcelona Show.

=== 1st series ===
Production started in 1976 and ran to 1979. The model was fitted with a disc front brake. Electrics were uprated to 12v and an electric starter fitted. The machine was finished in metallic red with chrome headlight and mudguards.

=== 2nd series ===
The model was updated in 1980 with cast wheels and a rear disc brake. The starter was moved from in front of the engine to behind the cylinders. The machine was finished in orange and the engine finished in black.

== Technical details ==
=== Engine and transmission ===
The single cylinder bevel drive OHC engine was of unit construction and had an alloy head and alloy barrel with cast iron liners. Bore and stroke were 76 mm × 75 mm (3.0 in × 3.0 in) giving a displacement of 340 cc (21 cu in). A 9:1 piston was fitted. Claimed power output was 22 bhp (16 kW) @ 8,000 rpm, giving the machine a top speed of 125 km/h (78 mph).

Fuel was delivered by a Dell'Orto PHF 30 AS carburettor. The engine used wet sump lubrication and ignition was by battery and coil.

Primary drive was by gears to a multi-plate wet clutch and 5 speed gearbox. Chain drive took power to the rear wheel.

=== Cycle parts ===
The single cradle frame used the engine as a stressed member. Rear suspension was by swinging arm with twin adjustable Telesco Hydrobag gas shock absorbers. At the front Telesco telescopic forks were fitted. A Brembo 260 mm (10 in) diameter disc brake was fitted on the front. Series 1 models had a 200 mm (7.9 in) diameter rear drum. A rear disc brake was fitted on the 2nd series.

Tyres were 325x18 front and 350x18 rear, fitted to spoked wheels on series 1 models and cast wheels on series 2.

== 300 Forza ==
Some 1976 models were fitted with a nominal 300 cc engine. This model was also known as the 300 Electronic. The bore and stroke of the engine was 66 mm × 75 mm (2.6 in × 3.0 in), giving an actual capacity of 256 cc (15.6 cu in).
