= Ducati 450 R/T =

SOHC motorcycle by Ducati

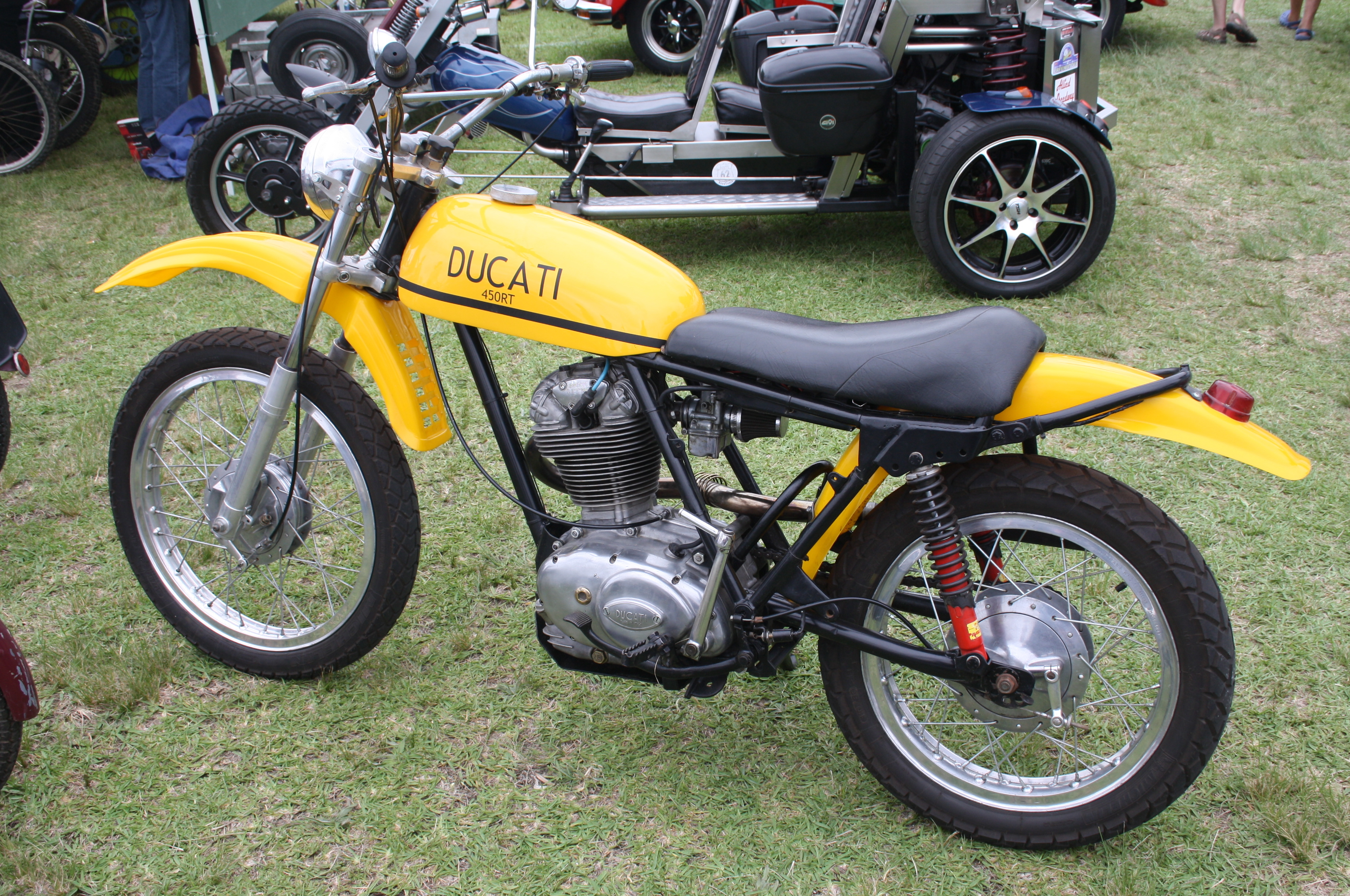
- Ducati 450 R/T
- Manufacturer: Ducati
- Production: 1971
- Class: On/off road
- Engine: 435.66 cc (26.586 cu in) Air-cooled bevel drive SOHC single cylinder four stroke
- Bore / stroke: 86 mm × 75 mm (3.4 in × 3.0 in)
- Compression ratio: 9.3:1
- Power: 36 bhp (27 kW) @ 6,500 rpm
- Transmission: Multiplate wet clutch, 5 speed
- Frame type: Half-duplex cradle
- Suspension: Front: telescopic forks Rear: swinging arm
- Brakes: Drum front & rear
- Tyres: Front: 300x21 Rear: 400x18
- Wheelbase: 1,450 mm (57 in)
- Dimensions: L: 2,180 mm (86 in); W: 930 mm (37 in); H: 1,200 mm (47 in)
- Seat height: 790 mm (31 in)
- Weight: 124 kg (273 lb) (dry)
- Fuel capacity: 10 L (2.2 imp gal; 2.6 US gal)

The Ducati 450 R/T (road/trail) is a 436 cc (26.6 cu in) single cylinder bevel drive desmodromic SOHC motorcycle produced by the Italian manufacturer Ducati from 1971 to 1974. Initially produced at the request of the American importers Berliner Motor Corporation as a motocross / enduro motorcycle offered exclusively to the American market, and only a few hundred machines were made of this type. It is the only off-road racing motorcycle to use desmodromic valves. An optional street equipment kit was available. From 1972 it was produced for the European Market as a street legal on/off-road machine, which was sometimes known as the 450 T/S.

Total production was around 460 machines.

== History ==
American desert racers Doug Douglas and Jim McClurg had won the inaugural Baja 500 on a modified 350 Ducati desmo in 1969. This prompted US importer to request a 450 off-Road racer to compete with the successful BSA B44 Victor. Ducati employed 1966 Italian scrambles champion Walter Reggioli to develop the new bike.

The tank, mudguards and side panels were made of bright yellow fibreglass. Even with rubber-mounting, engine vibration and frame-flex caused the components to crack.

A street equipment kit was available which consisted of front and rear lights, wiring and handlebar switches. With the kit fitted the bike was not street-legal as it had no brake light, horn or silencer.

The engine was set too far back for the short wheelbase making the machine difficult to turn. With under-damped suspension and a dry weight of nearly 300 lb (140 kg), American riders preferred the new lightweight two strokes and the bike was only imported for a year.

At the 1971 ISDT held on the Isle of Man, the Italian team used R/Ts, including three fitted with demo 350 cc engines. These machines had a modified steering head angle, high level twin silencers and a centre stand to ease changing wheels when punctured.

In 1972 the bike was offered with full street equipment. This included lights, horn, instruments, alternator, coil ignition and an ignition switch mounted in the headlight shell. A low level exhaust and Silentum silencer, as used on the Mark 3, was fitted. In 1974 electronic ignition were fitted.

== Technical details ==
=== Engine and transmission ===
The single cylinder bevel drive OHC engine was of vertically spilt unit construction and had an alloy head and alloy barrels with austenitic liners. Ball bearings were used in the main bearings and roller bearings for the big end. The head used desmodromic valves. (A system where the valves are positively closed by extra lobes on the cam and levers rather than by a more conventional springs). Bore and stroke were 86 mm × 75 mm (3.4 in × 3.0 in) giving a displacement of 436 cc (26.6 cu in). Compression ratio was 9.3:1. and the claimed power output was 36 bhp (27 kW) @ 6,500 rpm. A decompressor was fitted to aid starting and also as a method of stopping the engine as no ignition switch was fitted.

Fuel was delivered by a 29 mm Dell'Orto UHB carburettor. Wet sump lubrication was used. Ignition was initially by flywheel magneto. This was changed to a battery and coil in 1972 and electronic ignition was fitted in 1974.

The primary drive was by helical gears to a multi-plate wet clutch to a 5 speed gearbox. Chain drive took power to the rear wheel.

=== Cycle parts ===
The 450 R/T used a newly designed single downtube frame that shared several features with the 750 GT. Front suspension was by 35 mm (1.4 in) diameter telescopic forks made by Marzocchi. Based on a design by Ceriani, they offered 7 in (180 mm) of travel. A swinging arm was used on the rear with twin non-adjustable shock absorbers. The top of the shock absorbers could be attached in four different positions to adjust the rear suspension geometry. 3-way adjustable shocks were fitted from 1972.

Brakes were 158 mm (6.2 in) diameter drums front and rear, the front being the same as the unit used on the Monza Junior. Wire wheels were fitted with Borrani alloy rims, and 400x21 front and 300x18 rear tyres.

== 350 R/T ==
A few 350 R/Ts were produced in 1971 and were fitted with the 350 desmo engine. In 1974 the R/T was available in the domestic Italian home market fitted with the non-demo engine of the Mark 3.
