= Ducati 50 Scrambler =

Two stroke motorcycle by Ducati

- Manufacturer: Ducati
- Production: 1970-1971
- Class: On/off road
- Engine: 50 cc (3.1 cu in) single cylinder Air-cooled two stroke
- Bore / stroke: 39 mm × 42 mm (1.5 in × 1.7 in)
- Compression ratio: 10.5:1
- Power: 3.27 bhp (2.44 kW) @ 6,000 rpm
- Transmission: Multiplate wet clutch, 4 speed
- Frame type: Duplex cradle
- Suspension: Front: telescopic forks Rear: swinging arm
- Brakes: Drum front & rear
- Tyres: Front: 250x18 Rear: 250x17
- Wheelbase: 1,180 mm (46 in)
- Dimensions: L: 1,840 mm (72 in); W: 800 mm (31 in)
- Seat height: 730 mm (29 in)
- Weight: 64 kg (141 lb) (dry)

The Ducati 50 Scrambler is an on/off-road 50 cc (3.1 cu in) single cylinder two stroke motorcycle produced by the Italian manufacturer Ducati in 1970 and 1971. The model was produced to take advantage of the dirt bike craze in Italy at the time. The model used many parts from existing models, keeping R&D costs down. A larger engined version, the 100 Scrambler, was also produced. Styling was similar the 125 Cadet Scrambler. The model did not sell well and was soon dropped.

== Technical details ==
=== Engine and transmission ===
The engine of the Scrambler was taken from the 50SL. It was a piston ported two stroke of unit construction and had an alloy head and alloy barrel with a chrome-plated bore. Bore and stroke were 39 mm × 42 mm (1.5 in × 1.7 in) giving a displacement of 50 cc (3.1 cu in). Compression ratio was 10.5:1 and claimed power output was 3.27 bhp (2.44 kW) @ 6,000 rpm.

Fuel was delivered by a 18 mm Dell'Orto UA carburettor and ignition was by flywheel magneto. Petrol/oil mix provided lubrication.

Primary drive was by helical gears to a multi-plate wet clutch and a 4 speed gearbox. Chain drive took power to the rear wheel.

=== Cycle parts ===
The duplex frame was the same as that used on the Cadet and SL models. Rear suspension was by swinging arm with twin Marzocchi shock absorbers. At the front Ceriani pattern Marzocchi telescopic forks were fitted. Brakes were 118 mm (4.6 in) diameter drums front and rear.The bike had a high level exhaust and was finished in yellow and black.
