= Ducati 250 Scrambler =

SOHC motorcycle by Ducati

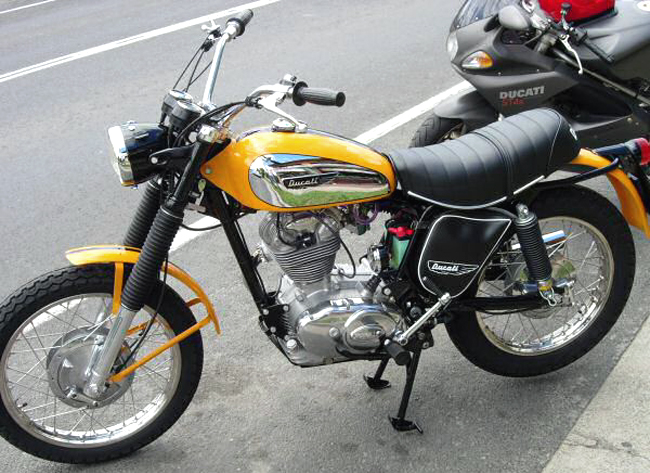
- 1973 Ducati 250 Scrambler
- Manufacturer: Ducati
- Also called: Ducati 250 SCR
- Production: 1962-1974
- Class: On/off-road
- Engine: 248.6 cc (15.17 cu in) Air-cooled bevel drive SOHC single cylinder four stroke
- Bore / stroke: 74 mm × 57.8 mm (2.91 in × 2.28 in)
- Compression ratio: 9.2:1
- Transmission: Multiplate wet clutch, 5 speed
- Frame type: Single cradle
- Suspension: Front: telescopic forks Rear: swinging arm
- Brakes: Drum front & rear
- Tyres: Front: 350x19 Rear: 480x18
- Wheelbase: 1,380 mm (54 in)
- Dimensions: L: 2,120 mm (83 in); W: 940 mm (37 in)
- Seat height: 770 mm (30 in)
- Weight: 132 kg (291 lb) (dry)

The Ducati 250 Scrambler, known in Europe as the Ducati 250 SCR is an on/off-road 249 cc (15.2 cu in) single cylinder bevel drive SOHC motorcycle produced by the Italian manufacturer Ducati from 1962 to 1974. Originally produced for the American Market at the request of the US importers, Berliner Motor Corporation, the model was offered in Europe from 1968. Total production was around 12,000 machines.

The model was also produced under licence in Spain by MotoTrans from 1972 to 1974.

== History ==
American importer Joe Berliner's brother Michael had converted a 250 Ducati to a flat-tracker, and Berliner asked Ducati to produce a similar machine with lights. Introduced in 1962, the 250 Scrambler used a tuned version of the 'narrow case' Monza engine with higher compression ratio, sportier cam and larger carburettor. It was advertised as a 4-in-1 machine, with a change of handlebars and exhaust the bike could be used for road racing, short track or enduro. The bike came with a competition kit consisting of spare cables, different sprockets and solid struts to replace the rear shock absorbers for short-track use. A silencer was included for road use. Ignition was by flywheel magneto and no battery was fitted.

In 1964 the Scrambler received a styling update with a different seat and Diana style tank. A five speed gearbox was introduced in 1965. In 1966 a skid plate, high level exhaust, better lights and a battery were fitted. Stronger front forks and 25% softer rear shocks were also fitted.

The 'wide case' engine was used from 1968 and this was regarded as the smoothest of the Ducati Scramblers. Staying was updated with a new tank with chrome panels, higher, wider bars and a short silencer.

A square slide Dell'Orto VHB carb was fitted in 1970 and the size reduced to 26 mm. Few Italian-made models were imported to the UK and US during 1970–71 as the importers (Berliner in the US and Vic Camp in the UK) were in dispute with the factory over prices. During this period Spanish-built MotoTrans models were imported.

From 1973 Spanish MotoTrans engines were fitted, along with electronic ignition.

The factory ceased production of OHC singles in 1974. The remaining stocks were purchased by the then British importer Coburn & Hughes, who continued to sell them until early 1976. These last 250 Scramblers were produced under licence by the Spanish company MotoTrans.

== Technical details ==
=== Engine and transmission ===
The single cylinder bevel drive OHC engine was of a vertically spilt unit construction and had alloy head and alloy barrels with austenitic liners. Ball bearings were used in the main bearings and roller bearings for the big end. Hairspring valve springs were used to close the valves. Bore and stroke were 74 mm × 57.8 mm (2.91 in × 2.28 in) giving a displacement of 249 cc (15.2 cu in). Compression ratio was 9.2:1.

The 'wide case' engine was introduced in 1968. Although the specifications were similar to the 'narrow case' engine, the new engine had a stronger bottom end with bigger main bearings and big end. Capacity of the wet sump was increased from 4 to 5.5 pints and the kickstart mechanism has been upgraded from the earlier models.

Fuel was supplied by a 27 mm Dell'Orto SSI carburettor, which was increased to 29 mm bore in 1967. With the introduction of the wide case engine in 1968 the 27 mm carb was used. A 26 mm square slide Dell'Orto VHB carb was fitted from 1970. 1973/4 models fitted with MotoTrans engines used a 26 mm Spanish-made Amal carb.

Ignition was initially by flywheel magneto. This was changed to battery and coil in 1968 and electronic ignition was fitted in 1973. Power output varied from 18 bhp (13 kW) to 30 bhp (22 kW) dependent on year and specification.

Primary drive was by helical gears to a multi-plate wet clutch. A 4 speed gearbox was initially fitted, with a 5 speed box being fitted from 1964. Chain drive took power to the rear wheel.

=== Cycle parts ===
The single cradle frame used the engine as a stressed member. When the wide case engine was introduced the frame was modified for the wider rear mountings and twin rear loops were added which made the frame stronger and stiffer.

Rear suspension was by swinging arm with twin 3-way adjustable Marzocchi shock absorbers. At the front 30 mm (1.2 in) telescopic forks were fitted. Brakes were drums, the front being 180 mm (7.1 in) diameter front and 160 mm (6.3 in) rear. Wire wheels were used with 300x19 front and 350x19 rear tyres. Tyres were changed to 350x19 and 400x18 in 1966.
