= Ducati 450 Mark 3 =

SOHC motorcycle by Ducati

- Manufacturer: Ducati
- Production: 1969–1974
- Class: Standard
- Engine: 436 cc (26.6 cu in) Air-cooled bevel drive SOHC single cylinder four stroke
- Bore / stroke: 86 mm × 75 mm (3.4 in × 3.0 in)
- Compression ratio: 9.3:1
- Power: 27 bhp (20 kW) @ 7,000 rpm
- Transmission: Multiplate wet clutch, 5 speed
- Frame type: Single cradle
- Suspension: Front: telescopic forks Rear: swinging arm
- Brakes: Drum front & rear
- Tyres: Front: 300x19 Rear: 350x18
- Wheelbase: 1,360 mm (54 in)
- Dimensions: L: 2,000 mm (79 in); W: 590 mm (23 in)
- Seat height: 735 mm (28.9 in)
- Weight: 130 kg (290 lb) (dry)

The Ducati 450 Mark 3 is a 436 cc (26.6 cu in) single cylinder bevel drive SOHC motorcycle produced by the Italian manufacturer Ducati from 1969 to 1974. The 450 was largest displacement version of the OHC single series produced by Ducati and used the 'wide case' engine. A higher performance version, the Ducati 450 Mark 3D, which used desmodromic valves was also available. The 450 was criticised for vibration and lack of performance compared to other models such as the Mach 1.

Total production was around 1,800 Mark 3s and 1,400 Mark 3Ds.

== History ==
The 'wide case' engine, introduced in 1968, had been designed with the possibility of enlarging it the existing largest 340 cc displacement. In 1969 the 436 cc '450' was introduced to compete with other manufacturers machines such as the BSA B44. This was the largest displacement the engine could be enlarged to without redesigning.

Except from a strengthened frame, the 450 shared the same cycle parts as the 250 and 350 Mark 3s. A 13 L (2.9 imp gal; 3.4 US gal) 'coffin' style tank was normal fitment but some 450 used the scrambler tank.

Few 450s were imported to the US and UK during 1970–71 as the importers (Berliner in the US and Vic Camp in the UK) were in dispute with the factory over prices.

The Mark 3 in received a new larger tank in 1971. For the Italian home market, two touring variants were introduced, the 450T and 450TS. These had 12 volt electrics, deeper mudguards, panniers crash bars and a lower compression ratio.

An American ban on fibreglass tanks in 1972 and a dealer dispute around the same time limited distribution in the US.

In 1973 all models were restyled by Leopoldo Tartarini of Italjet, and had a revised dual seat, side covers, Smiths instruments and CEV headlight which were similarly styled to the 750 GT. These machines were finished in blue and gold. 35 mm Marzocchi forks and a twin-sided Grimeca front brake were also fitted that year.

The factory ceased production of OHC singles in 1974.

== 450 Mark 3D ==
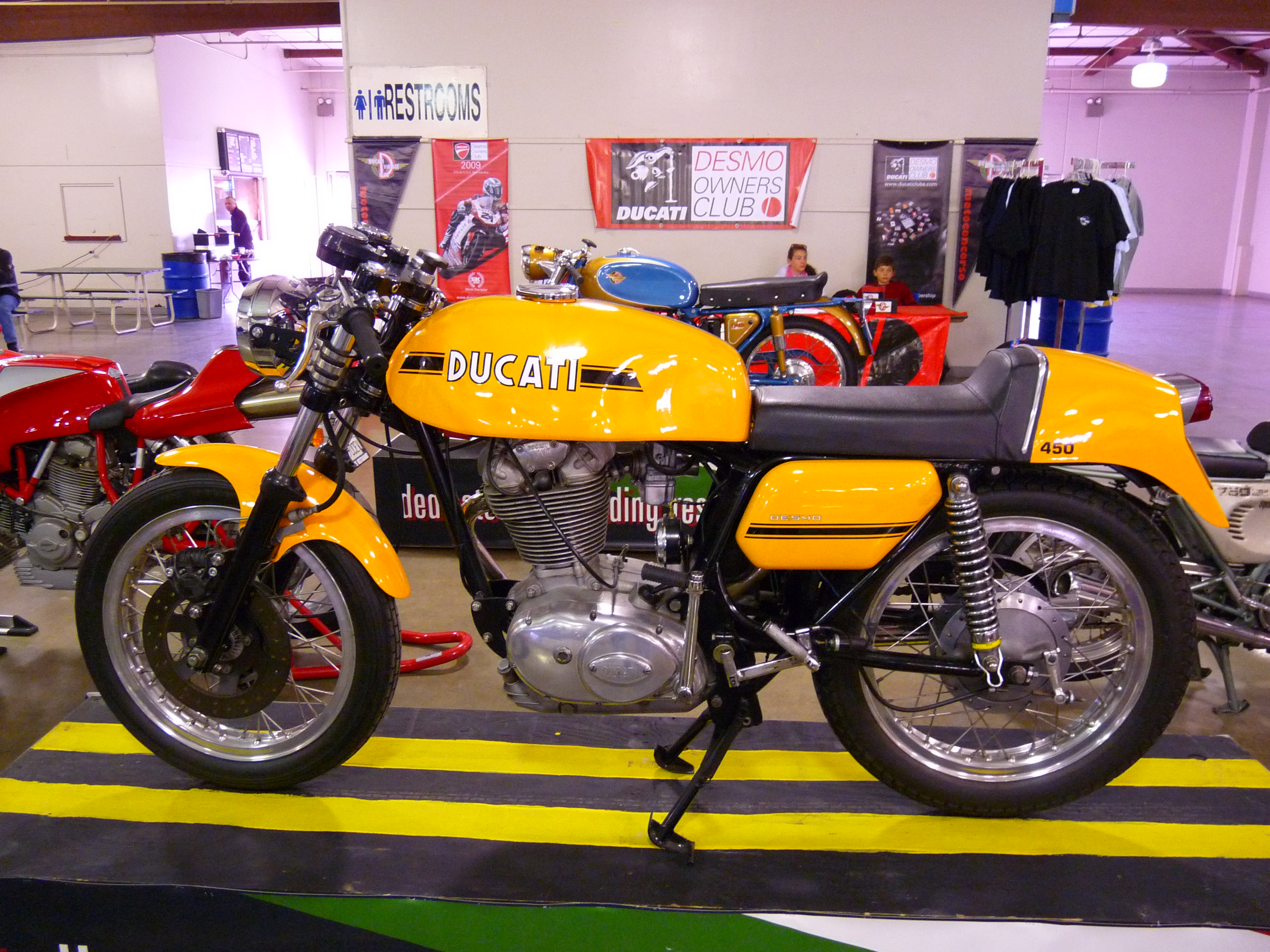
Late model Ducati 450 Desmo

A higher performance version of the Mark 3 was offered, the Mark 3D, that was fitted with a different head that used desmodromic valves. (A system where the valves are positively closed by extra lobes on the cam and levers rather than by a more conventional springs). The head was derived from that used on the 350 SCD racers. Although using a desmo system, lightweight hairspring valve springs were retained. The rest of the engine was the same as the non-desmo mark 3, as were the cycle parts. The 3D produced 31 bhp (23 kW).

In 1971 the Mark 3 and the desmo models diverged, the desmo becoming the 450 Desmo with cafe racer styling. The Desmo had clip-on handlebars, a fibreglass tank and a ‘monoposto’ single seat. It was finished in ‘bowling ball’ metal flake silver which gave rise to it being nicknamed the silver shotgun, a name first coined by Australian magazine Two Wheels.

Restyled by Leopoldo Tartarini, a metal tank, different side panels, Smiths clocks and a combined seat and rear mudguard were fitted from 1973 and finished in the yellow and black colouring of the 750 S. In the final year of production, 1974, Ceriani front fork and a single 280 mm (11 in) Brembo disc brake were fitted.

== Technical details ==
=== Engine and transmission ===
The single cylinder bevel drive OHC engine was of unit construction and had alloy head and alloy barrels with cast iron liners and was based on the 'wide case' engines used in the racers. Bore and stroke were 86 mm × 75 mm (3.4 in × 3.0 in) giving a displacement of 436 cc (26.6 cu in). A high compression 9.3:1 piston was fitted (8:1 on the Mark 3 Tourer). Claimed power output was 27 bhp (20 kW) @ 7,000 rpm for the standard model and 31 bhp (23 kW) @ 7,000 rpm for the desmo, which used a different camshaft. A decompression lever was fitted to aid kicking the engine over.

Fuel was delivered by a 29 mm square-slide Dell'Orto VHB carburettor. The engine used wet sump lubrication. The final 1974 models were fitted with electronic ignition.

Primary drive was by helical gears to a multi-plate wet clutch and 5 speed gearbox. Chain drive took power to the rear wheel, using a wider chain than the 350 model.

=== Cycle parts ===
The single cradle frame was a strengthened version of the frame used on the 350, with gussets welded to the top frame tube. The engine was used as a stressed member of the frame. Rear suspension was by swinging arm with twin 3-way adjustable Marzocchi shock absorbers. At the front 31.5 mm (1.24 in) telescopic forks were fitted. Brakes were drums, the front being 180 mm (7.1 in) diameter front and 160 mm (6.3 in) rear.

From 1972 35 mm (1.4 in) mm Marzocchi forks and a twin-sided Grimeca from brake were fitted.
