= Ducati Scrambler (2015) =

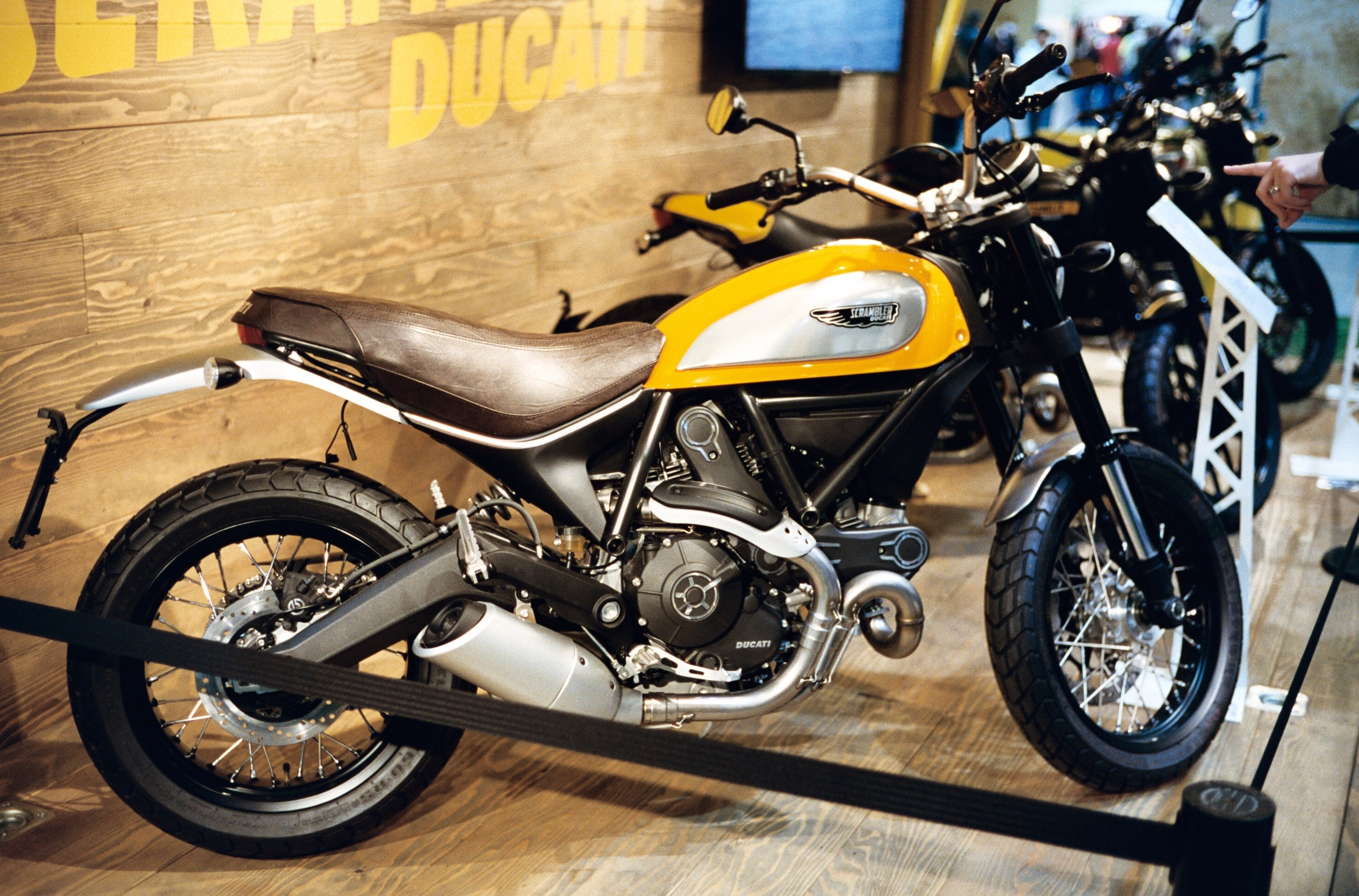
- Manufacturer: Ducati
- Parent company: Lamborghini
- Production: 2015–present (803cc and 399cc); 2018–present (1079cc)
- Predecessor: Ducati Scrambler (original)
- Class: Standard
- Engine: 399–1,079 cc (24.3–65.8 cu in) air-cooled 4-stroke desmodromic 2-valve V-twin engine
- Bore / stroke: 98.0 mm × 71.0 mm (3.86 in × 2.80 in) (1079 cc); 88.0 mm × 66.0 mm (3.46 in × 2.60 in) (803 cc); 72.0 mm × 49.0 mm (2.83 in × 1.93 in) (399 cc)
- Compression ratio: 11.0:1 (1079 and 803 cc); 10.7:1 (399 cc)
- Power: 64 kW (86 hp) @ 7,500 rpm (1079 cc); 50.0 kW (67.1 hp) @ 8,100 rpm (803 cc); 30 kW (40 hp) @ 8,750 (399 cc)
- Torque: 88.9 N⋅m (65.6 lb⋅ft) @ 4,750 rpm (1079 cc); 61.8 N⋅m (45.6 lb⋅ft) @ 5,800 rpm (803 cc); 34.3 N⋅m (25.3 lbf⋅ft) @ 8,000 rpm (399 cc)
- Transmission: 6-speed constant mesh
- Frame type: Tubular steel trellis
- Suspension: Front: Inverted 45 mm (1.8 in) Marzocchi fully adjustable telescopic fork (1079 cc), Inverted 41 mm (1.6 in) Kayaba telescopic fork (803 cc), 41 mm (1.6 in) Showa telescopic fork (399 cc); Rear: Swingarm with Kayaba monoshock, adjustable preload
- Brakes: Front: Radial 4-piston caliper with dual 320 mm (13 in) disc, ABS as standard (1079 cc), Radial 4-piston caliper with single 330 mm (13 in) disc, ABS as standard (803 cc), floating dual-piston caliper with single 320 mm (13 in) disc, ABS as standard (399 cc); Rear: Floating single-piston caliper with single 245 mm (9.6 in) disc
- Tires: Front: 120/80 R18 (1079 cc), 110/80 R18 (803 cc, 399 cc); Rear: 180/55 R17 (1079 cc, 803 cc), 160/60 R17 (399 cc)
- Rake, trail: 24.5° (1079cc), 24° (803cc, 399cc), 111 mm (4.4 in) (1079cc) 112 mm (4.4 in) (803cc, 399cc)
- Wheelbase: 1,514 mm (59.6 in) (1079 cc); 1,445 mm (56.9 in) (803 cc); 1,460 mm (57 in) (399 cc)
- Dimensions: L: 2,100–2,165 mm (82.7–85.2 in) (803 cc); 2,150 mm (85 in) (399 cc); W: 845 mm (33.3 in), with mirrors (803 cc); 860 mm (34 in), with mirrors (399 cc); H: 1,150 mm (45 in) (803 cc); 1,165 mm (45.9 in) (399 cc)
- Seat height: 810 mm (32 in) (1079 cc); 790 mm (31 in) (803 cc, 399 cc) (without accessories)
- Weight: 189 kg (417 lb) (1079 cc); 170 kg (370 lb) (803 cc); 167 kg (368 lb) (399 cc) (dry); 206 kg (454 lb) (1079 cc); 186 kg (410 lb) (803 cc); 183 kg (403 lb) (399 cc) (wet)
- Fuel capacity: 15 L (3.3 imp gal; 4.0 US gal) (1079 cc); 13.5 L (3.0 imp gal; 3.6 US gal) (803 cc); 14.0 L (3.1 imp gal; 3.7 US gal) (399 cc)
- Fuel consumption: 5.0 L/100 km; 56 mpg_{‑imp} (47 mpg_{‑US})

The Ducati Scrambler is a V-twin engined standard or roadster motorcycle made by Ducati. The Scrambler was introduced at the 2014 Intermot motorcycle show, with US sales beginning in 2015, in seven configurations: the 803 cc (49.0 cu in) Classic, Urban Enduro, Icon, Flat Track Pro, Full Throttle, Italia Independent and the 399 cc (24.3 cu in) Sixty2.

The Scrambler name and design concept are a revival of the Scrambler line of dual-sport singles made from 1962 to 1974. While the retro design incorporates some motocross elements such as the handlebar and brake pedal, the bikes are intended for street use only and are not adapted to off-road riding. The Urban Enduro version, while not literally an enduro motorcycle, has additional off-road oriented components, namely wire wheels, a handlebar cross bar brace, fork protectors, a sump guard, a headlight grill, and Pirelli MT60 dual-sport tires, and Ducati says the bike "may be used occasionally on dirt trail" but it is not designed for "heavy off-road use". Cycle World's Don Canet said, "tackling fire roads and mild single-track is well within the Scrambler role".

== History ==
The Scrambler bikes' engines and frames are made at Ducati's Borgo Panigale, Italy, factory and then shipped to Thailand for final assembly. Production began in December 2014.

As of 2017 there are six different variations of the Ducati Scrambler model they are the Sixty2, Icon, Classic, Full Throttle, Café Racer, and Desert Sled.

Cycle World tested the 803 cc Scrambler Icon's acceleration from 0 to 1/4 mile (0.00 to 0.40 km) at 12.46 seconds at 170.64 km/h (106.03 mph), and 0 to 97 km/h (0 to 60 mph) in 3.7 seconds. The Icon's braking distance was 97 to 0 km/h (60 to 0 mph) of 39 m (129 ft).

In 2018, Ducati added a new line of Scrambler models with a larger displacement engine (1,079 cc), and larger frame, the Scrambler 1100. 3 models were introduced: Scrambler 1100, Scrambler 1100 Special, and the Scrambler 1100 Sport. The 1100 line added features that were lacking in the original Scrambler line such as Traction Control, 3 Riding Modes (Active, Journey and City), and a fuel gauge.

In 2019, Ducati revised the instrument gauge for the 803 Scrambler range, adding a fuel meter as well as gear select. A hydraulic clutch was also introduced.

2020 saw the introduction of the Scrambler 800 Night Shift with flat handlebar, under seat side panels similar to the flat track model of the past as well as spoke wheels.

In 2021, Ducati introduced the Scrambler Desert Sled Fast House limited edition with Fast House livery.

In 2024, to celebrate the 10th anniversary of the entire Scrambler range since the original Scrambler was released back in 2014, Ducati collaborated with Italian motorcycle acccesory brand Rizoma to create the Scrambler 10° Anniversario Rizoma Edition. Limited to 500 machines, this particular model features a special black, white and rose gold (or "Metal Rose") livery designed by Rizoma in collaboration with Ducati Centro Stile, bar-end mirrors in place of standard mirrors, and Rizoma Urban Protocol footrests. It is also bundled with a unique limited edition Arai helmet that is painted in the same colors as the motorcycle.

== Gallery ==
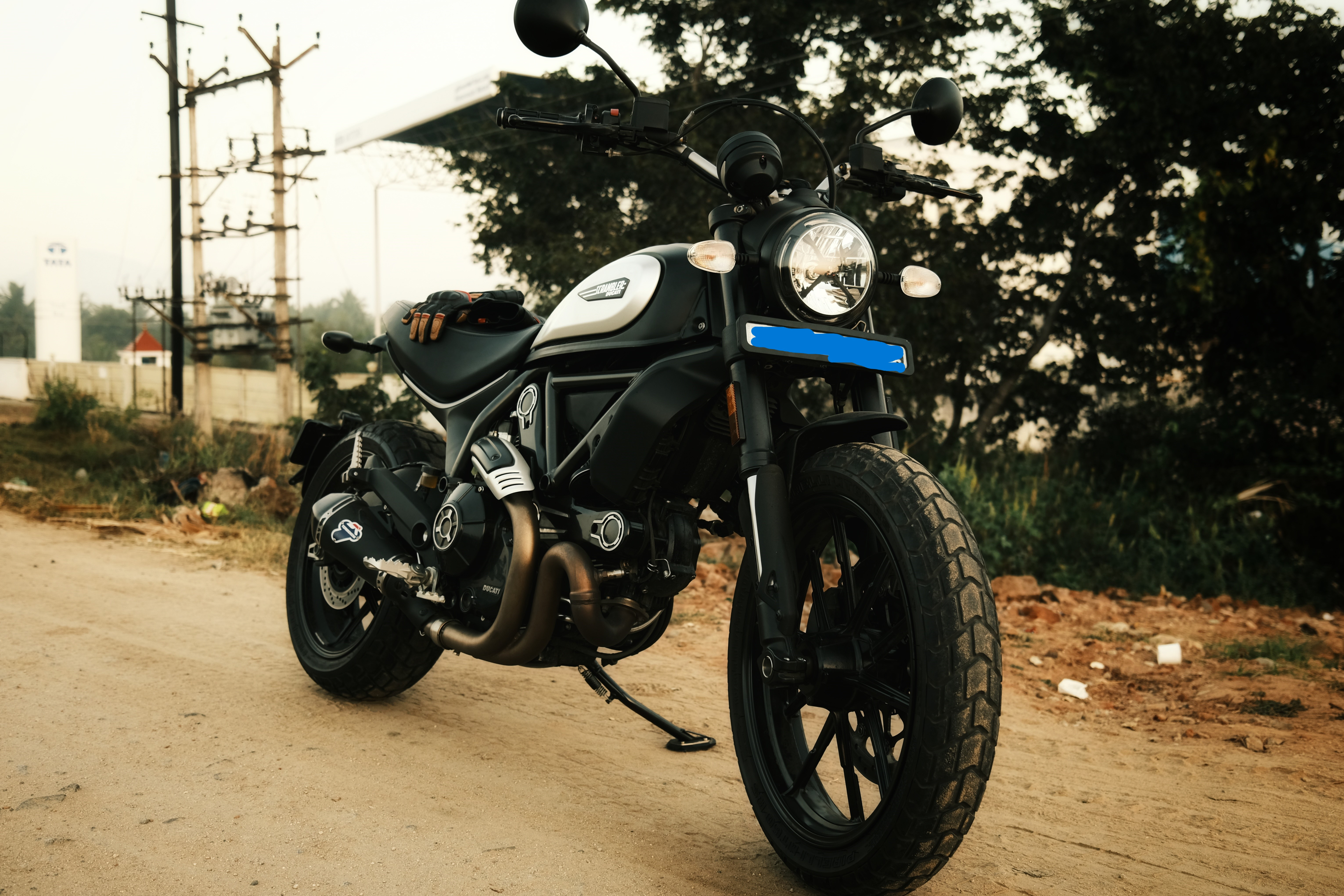
Scrambler icon

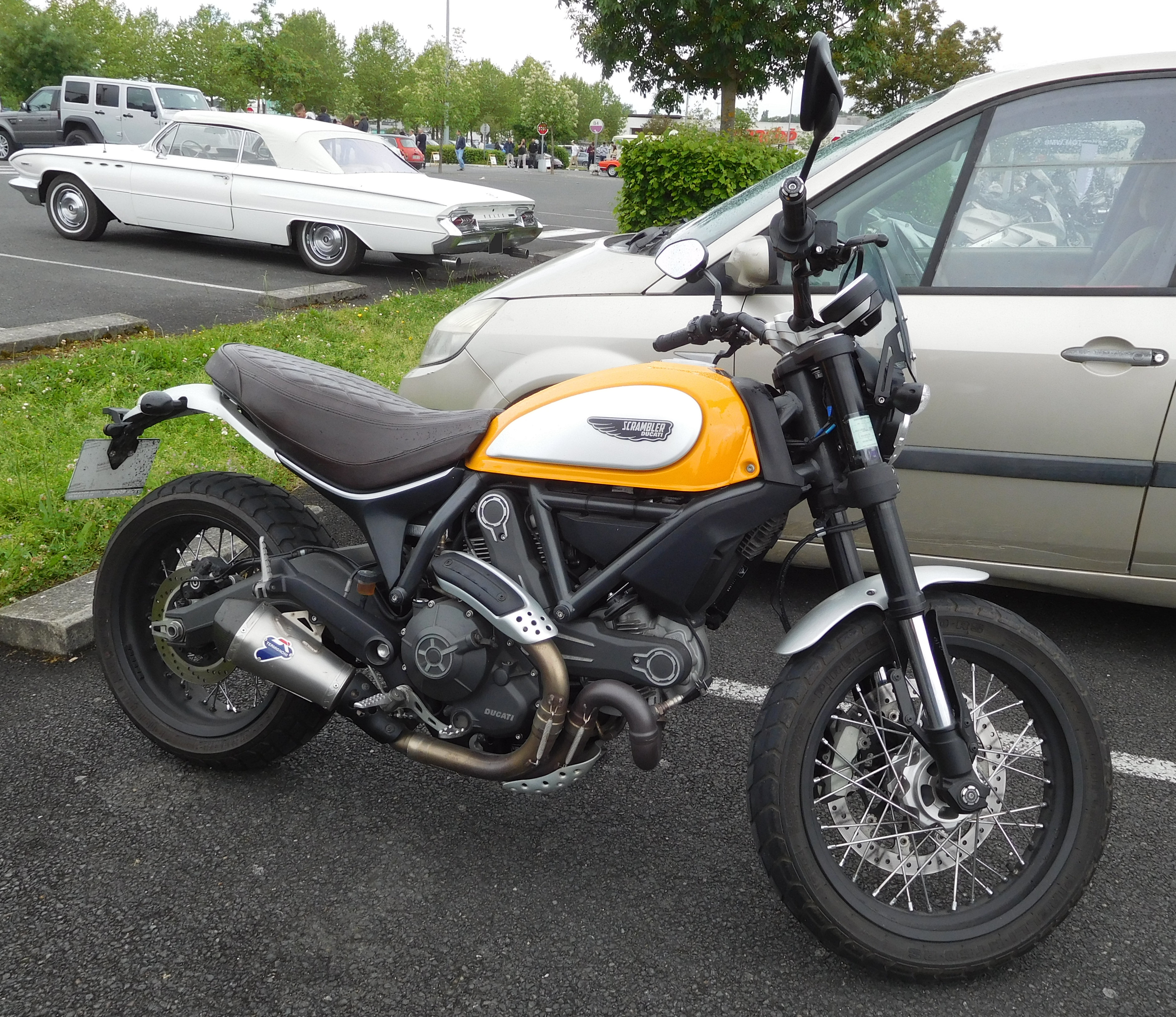
Scrambler Classic

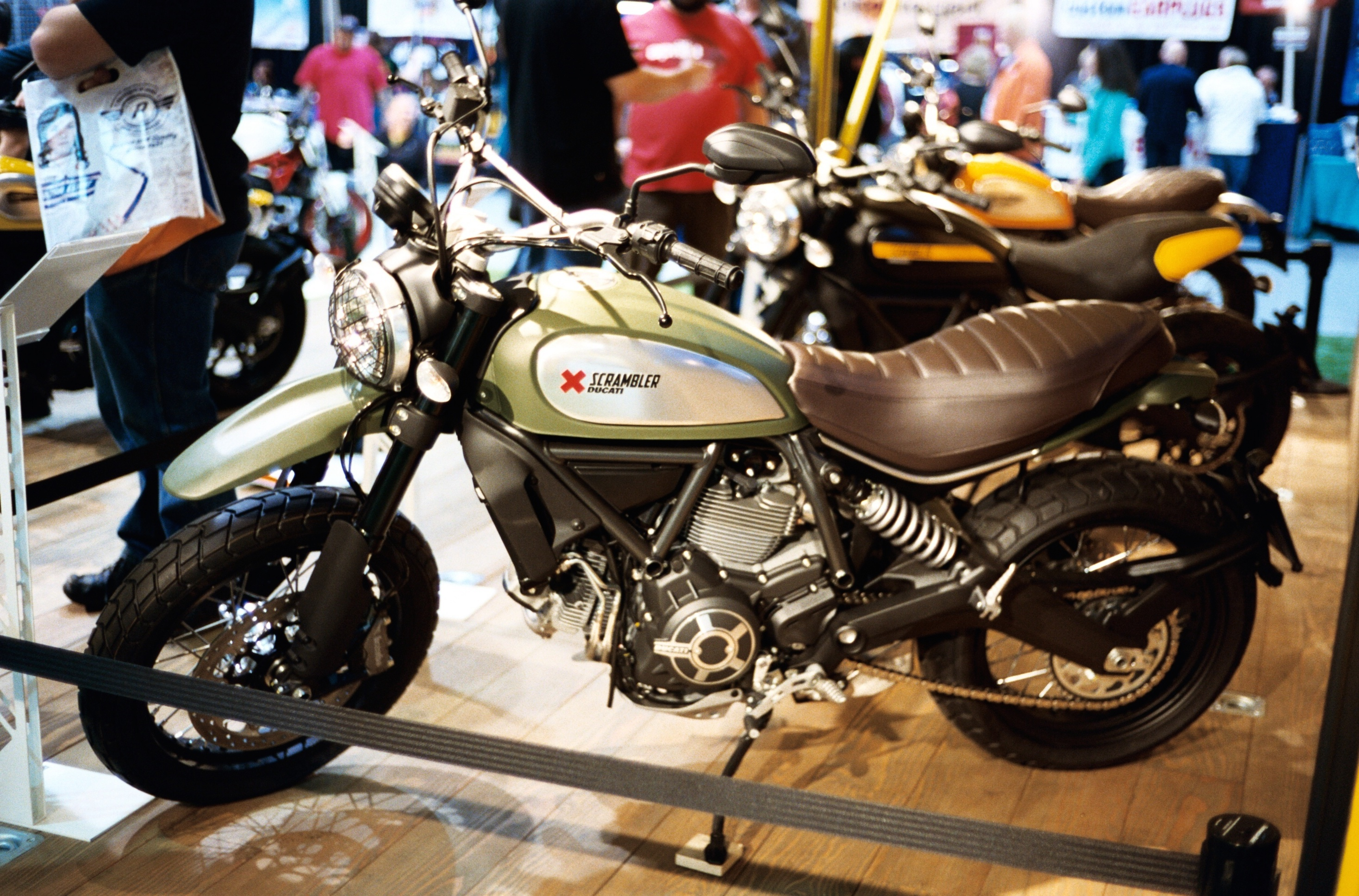
Scrambler Urban Enduro

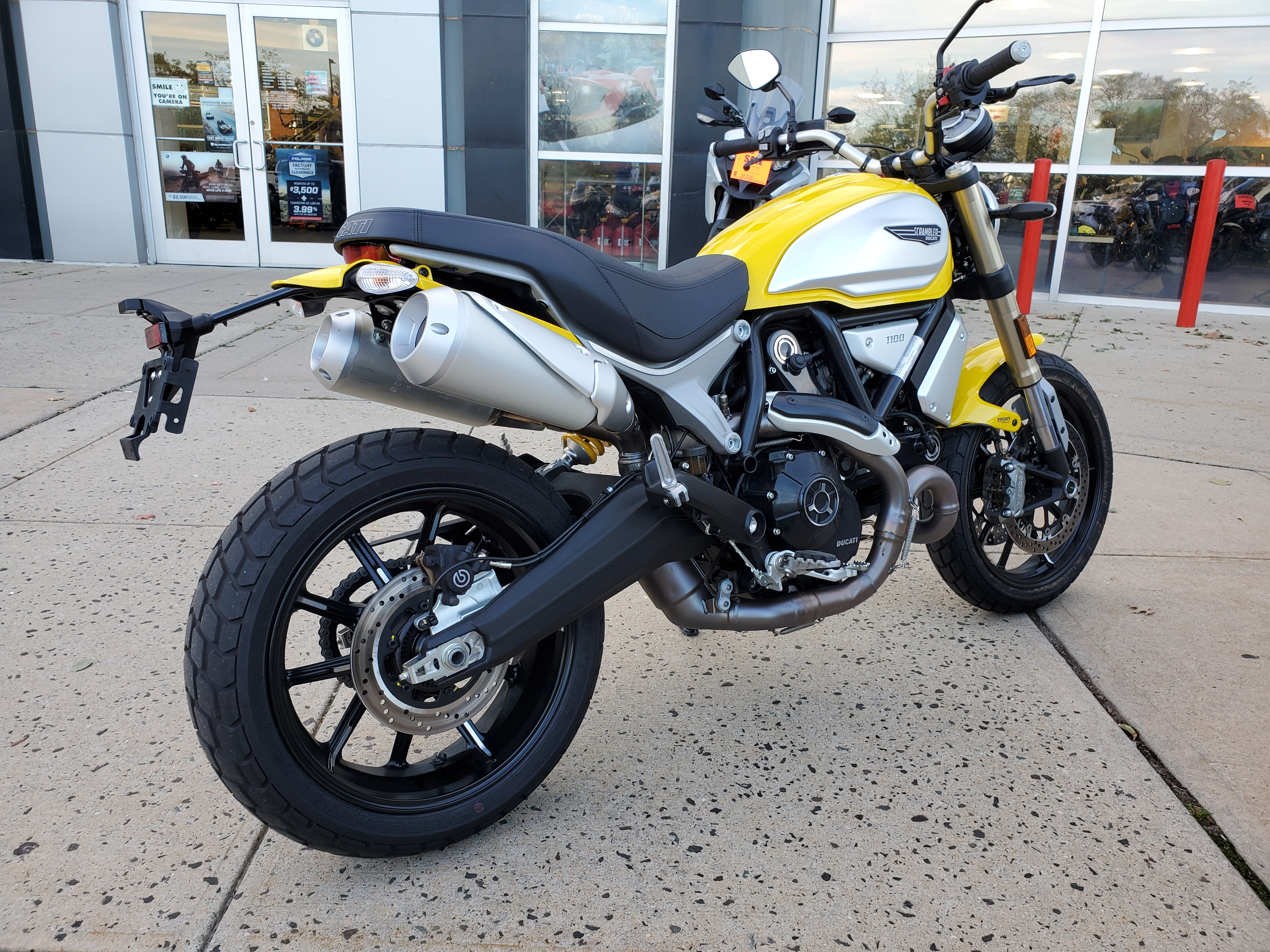
Scrambler 1100

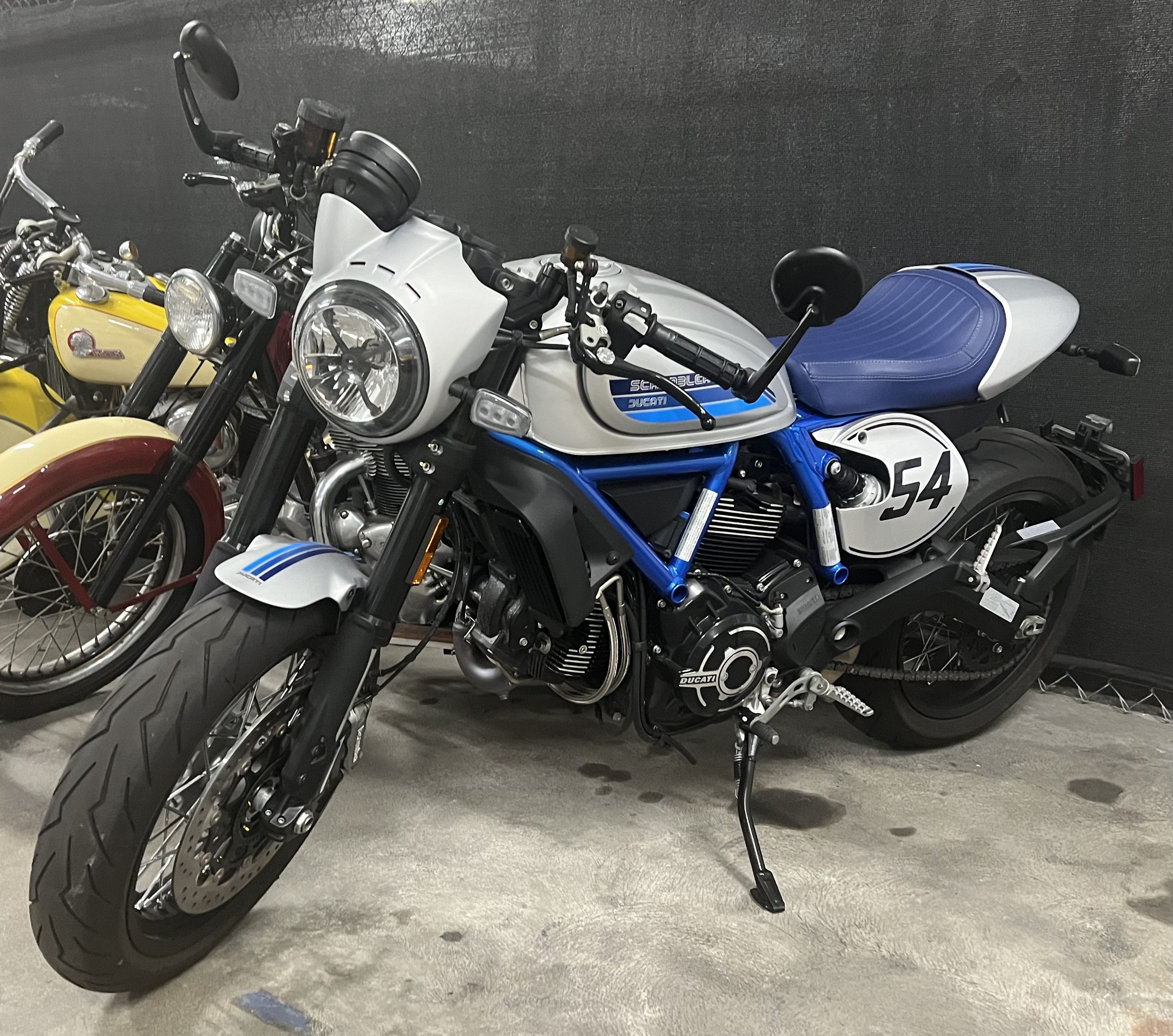
Scrambler Café Racer
