= Berliner Motor Corporation =

American motorcycling retailer

- Company type: Private
- Founded: New York, NY USA 1951
- Founder: Brothers Joseph and Michael Berliner
- Defunct: Circa 1984
- Fate: Defunct
- Headquarters: Hasbrouck Heights, New Jersey
- Area served: North America
- Key people: President Joseph Berliner, Vice President or Sales Manager Michael Berliner, Director of Public Relations Walter von Schonfeld Bob Blair Calif. Norton dealer and racing representative, Reno Leoni race bike builder sent by Ducati
- Products: Motorcycles
- Services: Import, distribution, and retail sale of European motorcycles in the USA
- Divisions: Premier Motor Corporation (Moto Guzzi), International Motorcycle Co. (Sachs and Zündapp), J-Be, J. B. Matchless Corporation (Matchless)

Berliner Motor Corporation was the US distributor from the 1950s through the 1980s for several European motorcycle marques, including Ducati, J-Be, Matchless, Moto Guzzi, Norton, Sachs and Zündapp, as well as selling Metzeler tires. Berliner Motor was highly influential as the voice of the huge American market to the motorcycle companies they bought bikes from, and their suggestions, and sometimes forceful demands, guided many decisions in Europe as to which bikes to develop, produce, or discontinue.

Joe Berliner [...] a man endowed with great decision-making power in Borgo Panigale

— Heritage Features and News. Ducati Motor Holding S.p.A.

Joseph and Michael Berliner at the Earl's Court Show, 1965

== Founding ==
Joseph Berliner founded his motorcycle business in New York City distributing and repairing Zündapp motorcycles east of the Mississippi in 1951, using contacts with that German manufacturer he had developed before World War II. He was a Hungarian Jewish refugee from the Holocaust who had spent time in Hungarian slave labor camps, and had lost 16 close family members on arrival at Auschwitz. Michael Berliner, the youngest of 5 brothers, was saved only because Joseph, and another Berliner brother, both of whom the SS intended to exploit for their skill as mechanics, convinced them that young Michael, too, was a mechanic. The Berliner brothers survived by maintaining a fleet of German army trucks. One brother would die of hunger and typhus, leaving only Joseph, Michael, and two other siblings alive after the war.

Prior to the Holocaust, Joseph Berliner worked in his father's radio-bicycle-motorcycle shop, and had received schooling in mechanics and business. After the war he assisted in Jewish relief in Frankfurt, Germany, and was able to find his wife who had been liberated by the Swedish Red Cross. As the sons of a Hungarian anti-Communist World War I war hero, the brothers feared returning to their Soviet-controlled homeland, and so emigrated to the US.

== Motorcycles inspired ==
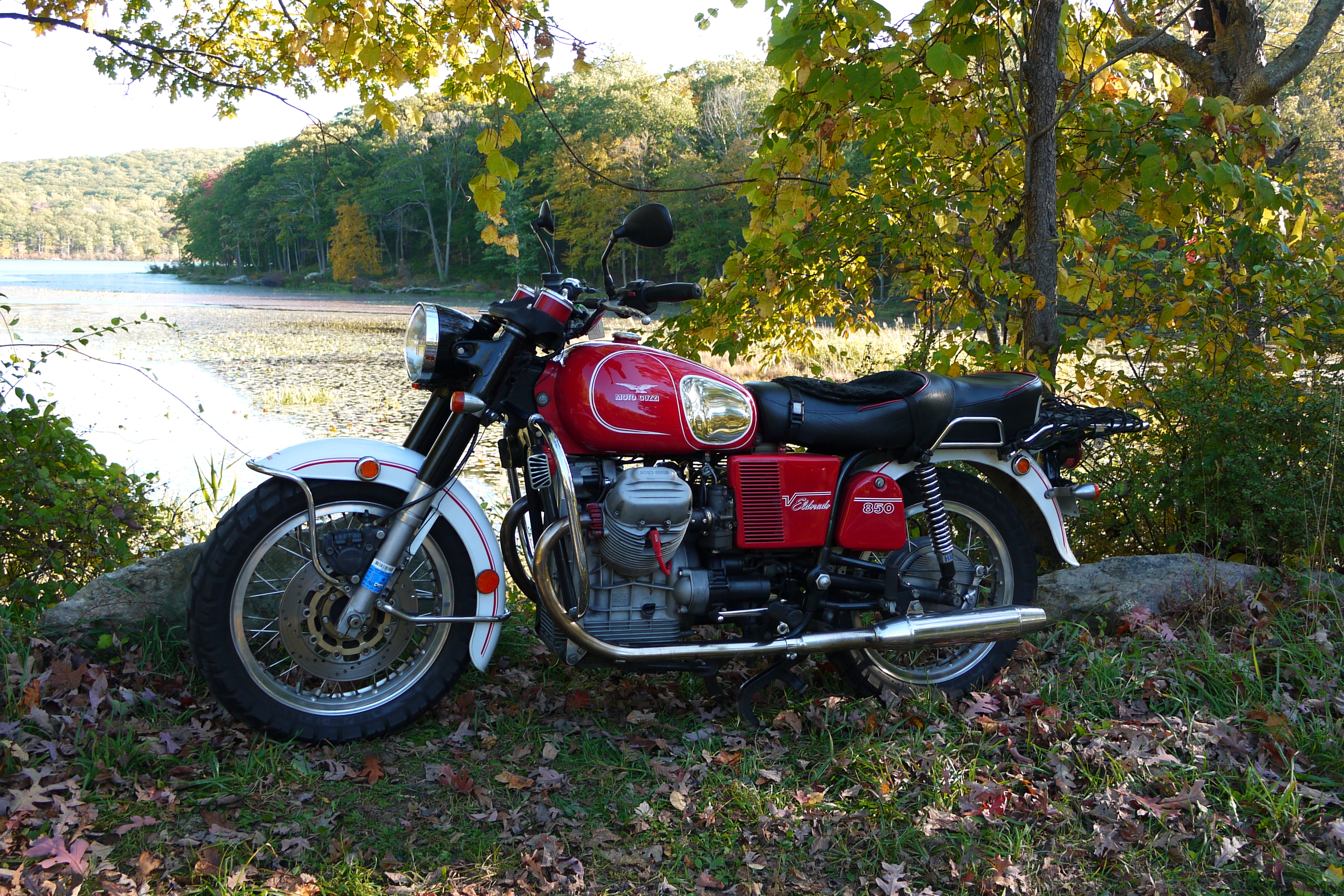
1974 Moto Guzzi Eldorado imported by Berliner

- Ducati Apollo: Berliner Motor Corporation provided Ducati with both the "almost freakish for the time" specification and part of the financing to develop the failed, yet visionary, Ducati Apollo. The detailed specification Joseph Berliner created came about because he wanted to take advantage of anti-trust rules that required police departments to consider vendors other than Harley-Davidson. To win any of this lucrative business he needed to meet all of the minimum specifications the departments had, such as a 1200 cc engine, and wanted to outperform Harley-Davidson in such areas as top speed and horsepower.
- Ducati 450 R/T
- Ducati Bronco
- Ducati Scrambler
- Norton Atlas
- Norton Scrambler
- Norton P11
- Moto Guzzi V7/Ambassador/Eldorado: Moto Guzzi, like Ducati, was under pressure from the Berliner brothers to produce a Harley-Davidson-style big-bore V-engined bike. It was reported that Moto Guzzi sold 5,000 Eldorados per year from 1972 to 1974, making it a fierce competitor to the Harley FLH.
- Moto Guzzi Le Mans

== Timeline ==
1941

- Joseph Berliner taken to slave labor camp.

1944

- Berliner brothers transferred to Auschwitz.

1947

- Emigrated to the US.

1951

- Distributed Zündapp East of the Mississippi.

1957

- Took over International Motorcycle Company, where Joseph Berliner had previously been a partner, including their US distributorship of Zündapp.

1958

- Began Ducati distributorship.

1959

- Headquarters moved from New York City to Railroad Ave. and Plant Road in Hasbrouck Heights, NJ.

1961

- Became sole Norton distributor for all US.

1963

- Became sole US Matchless distributor.

1965

- Evel Knievel's new motorcycle stunt troupe secured the sponsorship of Berliner Motor Corporation, who supplied them with a fleet of Norton Scramblers. In one version of the origin of stage name "Evel Knievel", it was Bob Blair of Berliner Motor Corporation who encouraged using the nickname rather than Bobby Knievel.

1968

- Berliner Motor abruptly refused an entire shipment of over 3,000 Ducati motorcycles they had ordered, as the stocks they had on hand were not selling quickly. To get themselves off the hook from Ducati, they turned to Associated Motor Cycles (AMC) in the UK, and used the leverage of the vast USA market they controlled, informing AMC that they would be needing no more of the struggling factory's Matchless motorcycles unless AMC found someone to purchase the unwanted Ducati shipment. The effect of Berliner's actions rippled through the UK motorcycle world, as this was a sizable flood of stock to enter the smaller, and already soft, UK market. The existing, formerly exclusive, Ducati distributor refused to sell parts to anyone whose bike had been purchased from what they saw as an illegitimate player in the field. These events are related by author Mick Walker, so as to explain how Walker got his start as a Ducati dealer when he came to purchase a substantial portion of this shipment in an effort to secure parts to aid the needy population of orphaned UK Ducati owners.

1984

- Moto Guzzi distributorship changes hands to Benelli/Moto Guzzi North America.
- Berliner Motor Corporation is out of business.

== Influence and legacy ==
The Berliner company is recognized by motorcycling pundits and historians as having an influence on the manufacturers they bought bikes from in proportion to the greater size of the American market to the other markets around the world, particularly during the 1950s and 60s. There is wide agreement that "bureaucrats" and "government" are the villains when the factories failed or nearly failed (as all of brands Berliner represented did at some point), as opposed to universally praised figures such as designer Fabio Taglioni.

Some place Berliner Motor Corporation squarely in the camp of those who were bringing disaster, for being "dollars and cents" businessmen. Author John F. Thompson calls Joseph Berliner a man who knew more about selling motorcycles than making them, in spite of his training and years experience as a mechanic, as well as distributor and marketer. Ian Falloon is highly critical of the low-cost pushrod two- and four-stroke single-cylinder models which Berliner demanded for their American customers, calling the entire sector "oddballs" and "dubious", while acknowledging that they did sell in far larger numbers than the much more expensive and highly labor-intensive bevel and desmo engines, whose design required production-limiting processes like shimming by skilled craftsmen. Falloon also admits that the Berliner brainchild Ducati Scrambler single was the most successful Ducati of the 60s and early 70s. On the other side, racer, dealer, and author Mick Walker is critical of the Italian executives' decision to end production of the entry-level singles and two-strokes in the 1970s, arguing, alongside the Berliners, that the brand's customer base would decline if they only catered to the demand for expensive, high-performance machines, while not also attracting new riders and earning their brand loyalty.

The Berliner Motor Corporation's obsession with entering the large and profitable US police motorcycle market against Harley-Davidson is characterized as folly for the unrealistic specification that Berliner demanded of the Ducati Apollo, yet authors like Falloon laud the Apollo for vision of this very specification. The Apollo engine, in V-twin form, would in fact become the heart of Ducatis for the following four decades. Similarly, the Berliners pushed Moto Guzzi to create a big v-twin for the American police market, and had greater success with the production of the Moto Guzzi V7. Like Ducati, this engine type would carry Moto Guzzi from those days up to the present day, and Moto Guzzi in the end found many police department customers for their version of the Berliner dream bike.
