= MotoTrans =

Spanish company

MotoTrans is a Spanish company which produced motorcycles and scooters between 1957 and 1983 when it was bought by Yamaha. It was famous for licensing Ducati engines and using them in MotoTrans motorcycles, as well as building Ducati motorcycles incorporating small differences.
