= Ducati 250 GT =

SOHC motorcycle by Ducati

- Manufacturer: Ducati
- Production: 1964-1966
- Predecessor: Ducati 200 GT
- Class: Standard
- Engine: Air-cooled bevel drive SOHC single cylinder four stroke
- Bore / stroke: 74 mm × 57.8 mm (2.91 in × 2.28 in)
- Compression ratio: 8:1
- Top speed: 74 mph (119 km/h)
- Power: 18.4 bhp (13.7 kW) @ 7,200 rpm (1964); 22 bhp (16 kW) @ 7,200 rpm (1965/6)
- Transmission: Multiplate wet clutch, 4 speed (1961-64) 5 speed (1965-68)
- Frame type: Single cradle
- Suspension: Front: telescopic forks Rear: swinging arm
- Brakes: Drum front & rear
- Tyres: Front: 275x18 Rear: 300x18
- Wheelbase: 1,320 mm (52 in)
- Dimensions: L: 2,000 mm (79 in); W: 580 mm (23 in); H: 1,070 mm (42 in)
- Seat height: 800 mm (31 in)
- Weight: 125 kg (276 lb) (dry)

The Ducati 250 GT, also known as the Ducati Daytona GT in the UK, is a 249 cc (15.2 cu in) single cylinder bevel drive SOHC motorcycle produced by the Italian manufacturer Ducati from 1964 to 1966. At the time of its launch it was the least powerful of Ducati's range of 250 cc machines.

== History ==
Introduced in 1964, the 250 GT was intended to be a replacement for the 200 GT although production of the two models overlapped. It was the first Ducati roadster to use the 5 speed gearbox. The chassis was mostly carried over from the 200 GT but with the larger tank of the Diana and the 31.5 mm (1.24 in) Ducati-made forks of the Mach 1. As the yokes of these forks carried no mountings for handlebars, high swan-neck handlebars were fitted that clamped to around the forks. Crash bars were fitted as standard. The engine was fitted with the soft 'black' camshaft and small 33 mm (1.3 in) valves.

The 250 GT was criticised as being underpowered, so in response Ducati fitted a higher performance 'violet' cam and a larger 37 mm (1.5 in) inlet valve for 1965, making the engine the same specification as the Monza. The 31.5 mm (1.24 in) Marzocchi forks used on the Monza were also fitted but the clip on handlebars were retained, although later that year more conventional handlebars were fitted.

In 1966 the bike was restyled and shared the angular styling of the Monza, Monza Junior and Sebring.

== Technical details ==
=== Engine and transmission ===
The single cylinder bevel drive OHC engine was of a vertically spilt unit construction and had alloy head and alloy barrels with austenitic liners. Ball bearings were used in the main bearings and roller bearings for the big end. Hairspring valve springs were used to close the valves. Bore and stroke were 74 mm × 57.8 mm (2.91 in × 2.28 in) giving a displacement of 249 cc (15.2 cu in). Compression ratio was 8:1 and claimed power output was 18.4 bhp (13.7 kW) @ 7,200 rpm. In 1965 the engine was uprated to Monza specification, giving a power output of 22 bhp (16 kW).

Fuel was delivered by a 24 mm Dell'Orto UBF carburettor. Wet sump lubrication was used and ignition was by battery and coil.

Primary drive was by helical gears to a multi-plate wet clutch to a 4 speed gearbox. Chain drive took power to the rear wheel.

=== Cycle parts ===
The single cradle frame used the engine as a stressed member. Rear suspension was by swinging arm with twin adjustable shock absorbers. At the front 31.5 mm (1.24 in) telescopic forks were fitted. Brakes were drums, the front being 180 mm (7.1 in) diameter and the rear 160 mm (6.3 in).
