= Ducati Diana Mark 3 =

SOHC motorcycle by Ducati

Ducati 250 Mark 3
- Manufacturer: Ducati
- Also called: Ducati SuperSport
- Production: 1962–1966
- Predecessor: Ducati Diana
- Successor: Ducati 250 Mark 3
- Class: sports
- Engine: Air-cooled bevel drive SOHC single cylinder four stroke
- Bore / stroke: 74 mm × 57.8 mm (2.91 in × 2.28 in)
- Compression ratio: 10:1
- Top speed: 100 mph (160 km/h)
- Power: 30 bhp (22 kW) @ 8,300 rpm
- Transmission: Multiplate wet clutch 4 speed (1961-64); 5 speed (1965-68)
- Frame type: Single cradle
- Suspension: Front: telescopic forks Rear: swinging arm
- Brakes: Drum front & rear
- Tyres: Front: 2.75 x 18; Rear: 3.00 x 18
- Wheelbase: 1,330 mm (52 in)
- Dimensions: L: 2,000 mm (79 in); H: 930 mm (37 in)
- Seat height: 750 mm (30 in)
- Weight: 110 kg (240 lb) (dry)

The Ducati Diana Mark 3, also known as the Ducati Diana SuperSport and commonly referred to as the Ducati Mark 3, is a 249 cc (15.2 cu in) single cylinder bevel drive SOHC motorcycle produced by the Italian manufacturer Ducati from 1962 to 1966. It was a higher performance version of the Ducati Diana and sold to the American market only. In 1963, Cycle World described it as "the fastest, and nearly the smoothest, standard motorcycle in the 250cc class". It was replaced in 1967 by the Ducati 250 Mark 3.

== History ==
Following the success in racing of the 250 F3, and using an engine based on that of the racer, Ducati introduced its first 250 cc road bikes at the April 1961 Milan Fair. The bikes were offered in two versions, the touring Monza and sports Diana. The Diana didn't sell well in the US and in 1962 the American importers, Berliner Motor Corporation, persuaded Ducati to make a higher performance model, the Diana Mark 3. Berliner had previously requested a 250 Scrambler to replace the 200 Motocross. The scrambler's engine was in a higher state of tune than the Diana, and this engine was used in the Diana Mark 3. The engine has a larger carburettor, higher compression ratio and a hotter camshaft. The Mark 3 also shares the scrambler's electrical system, using a flywheel magneto and no battery. The frame was finished in blue and the rest of the bike was blue and silver. As there was no battery, side panels were not fitted.

In 1965 the model received the big valve head that was used on the European Mach 1 and the larger 29 mm carb the Mach 1 used.

The bike was restyled for 1966, sharing the same angular styling of the 160 Monza Junior and 350 Sebring. Following criticism of the kickstart arrangement with the rear-set footrests, the bike was changed to have higher bars and footrest in the normal position. A new design Grimica front brake with an air-scoop was also fitted in 1966.

The Diana Mark 3 and the Mach 1 were replaced in 1967 with the 250 Mark 3.

== Technical details ==
=== Engine and transmission ===
The single-cylinder, bevel-drive OHC engine is of a vertically split unit construction and has alloy head and alloy barrels with austenitic liners. Ball bearings are used in the main bearings and roller bearings for the big end. Hairspring valve springs are used to close the valves. Bore and stroke are 74 mm × 57.8 mm (2.91 in × 2.28 in) giving a displacement of 248 cc (15.1 cu in). Compression ratio is 10:1. Larger valves were fitted in 1965. Claimed power output was 30 bhp (22 kW) @ 8,300 rpm, giving the machine a top speed of 100 mph (160 km/h).

Fuel is delivered by a 27 mm Dell'Orto SSI carburettor on early models and was increased to 29 mm in 1965. Wet sump lubrication is used and ignition is by flywheel magneto.

Primary drive is by helical gears to a multi-plate wet clutch and a 4-speed gearbox. A 5-speed cluster was fitted from 1965. Chain drive takes power to the rear wheel.

=== Cycle parts ===
The single cradle frame uses the engine as a stressed member. Rear suspension is by swinging arm with twin 3-way adjustable Marzocchi shock absorbers. At the front, 31.5 mm (1.24 in) telescopic forks are fitted. Brakes are drums, the front being 180 mm (7.1 in) diameter and the rear 160 mm (6.3 in).
