= MV Agusta 350B =

- Manufacturer: MV Agusta
- Also called: MV Agusta 350 Bicilindrica
- Production: 1970-1974
- Successor: MV Agusta 350 Ipotesi
- Engine: 349 cc (21 cu in) four-stroke parallel twin OHV
- Bore / stroke: 63 mm × 56 mm (2.5 in × 2.2 in)
- Compression ratio: 9.2:1
- Top speed: 96 mph (154 km/h)
- Power: 27 hp (20 kW) @ 7600 rpm
- Transmission: Wet, multi-plate clutch, unit construction 5-speed gearbox, chain drive
- Suspension: Front: Teledraulic forks Rear: swinging arm with hydraulic dampers
- Brakes: Front: 200 mm tls drum brake Rear: 200 mm sls drum brake
- Tires: Front: 2.75 x 18; Rear: 3.25 x 18
- Wheelbase: 1330 mm
- Weight: 149 kg (328 lb) (dry)

The MV Agusta 350B (Bicilindrica) was a series of motorcycles produced by the Italian manufacturer MV Agusta from 1970 to 1974. The motorcycle was first introduced at the Milan motorcycle show in 1969. The introduction of the "350" model was intended to bridge the production gap of MV Agusta in the medium-displacement sector and to take advantage of the prestige gained by the dominant GP racers. It was produced in "Sport", "Gran Turismo" and "Scrambler" versions.

The series was replaced by the MV Agusta 350 Ipotesi in 1975.

== Technical details ==
The four-stroke parallel twin OHV engine was derived from the existing 250 twin cylinder, the bore being increased by 10 mm to 63 mm to give 349 cc displacement. Featuring alloy barrels and heads, the cylinders were inclined forward by 20 degrees. Two 24 mm Dell'Orto carburettor fed fuel to the engine, which had a compression ratio of 9.2:1. Lubrication employed a wet sump. Power output was 27 bhp (20 kW) @ 7,600 rpm.

A geared primary drive took power to the wet, multi-plate clutch. The unit construction gearbox had 5 speeds, and final drive was by chain.

For the chassis, MV's usual single-beam frame in steel tube and sheet metal was used. Telescopic forks were used on the front, which because of the oil damping, were called "oleohydraulic forks" by MV. Rear suspension was by swinging arm and twin shock absorbers. Brakes were drums front and rear and spoked wheels were fitted.

In 1972 the machines were fitted with electronic ignition and had cosmetic changes. These models were designated "Elettronica".

== Model variants ==
=== 350B Sport ===
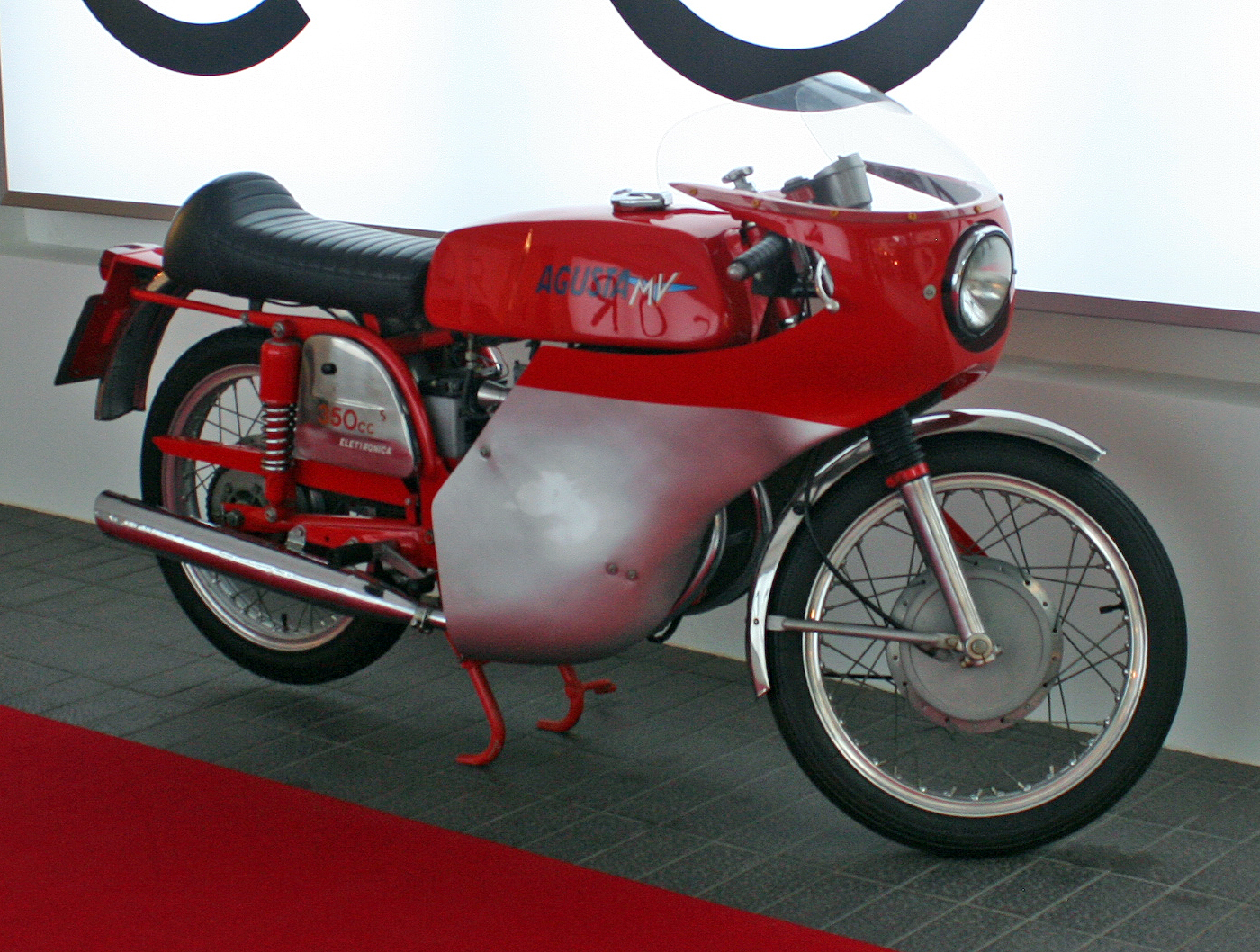
MV Agusta 350 Sport Elettronica with optional fairing fitted

The 350B Sport was the most popular model of the range with its sporty appearance and agile handling. A racing tank and humped seat were fitted with "clip-on" handlebars. The machine was finished in red with chrome fork legs, side panels, mudguards and headlight. It retailed at 510,000 lira in Italy.

In 1972 the updated 350 B Sport Elettronica was introduced. As well as electronic ignition, it gained a new petrol tank and larger side panels. A sports fairing (Carenatura) kit was available as an extra. 2,083 Sport Elettronica machines were produced.

=== 350B GT ===
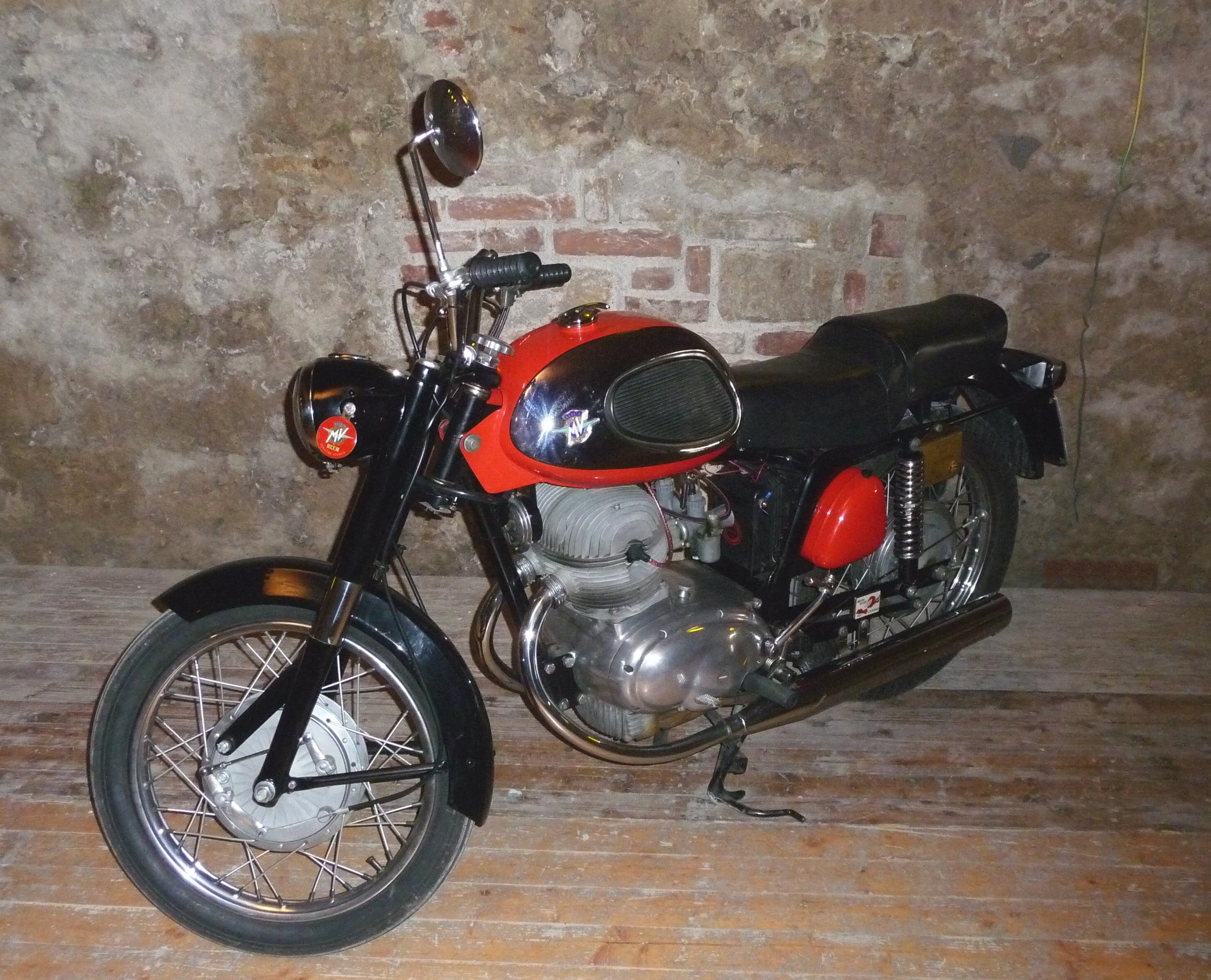
MV Agusta 350B GT

A less sports styled version was also offered, the 350B GT, also known as the 350B Turismo. It had a larger tank, a more conventional seat and higher handlebars. Frame, forks, mudguards and headlight were painted black, various colours of tank were available. 300 machines were produced.

Introduced in 1972, the MV Agusta 350B GT Elettronica had a new tank, larger side panels and electronic ignition. 646 machines of this variant were produced.

=== 350B Scrambler ===
Introduced in 1972, 350B Scrambler was an off-road "scrambler" styled machine. Using the Elettronica specification engine, the machine had high level exhaust pipes, raised handlebars and high front mudguards. The machine was aimed at the US market, but only 217 models were produced.

=== 350B Polizia Urbana ===
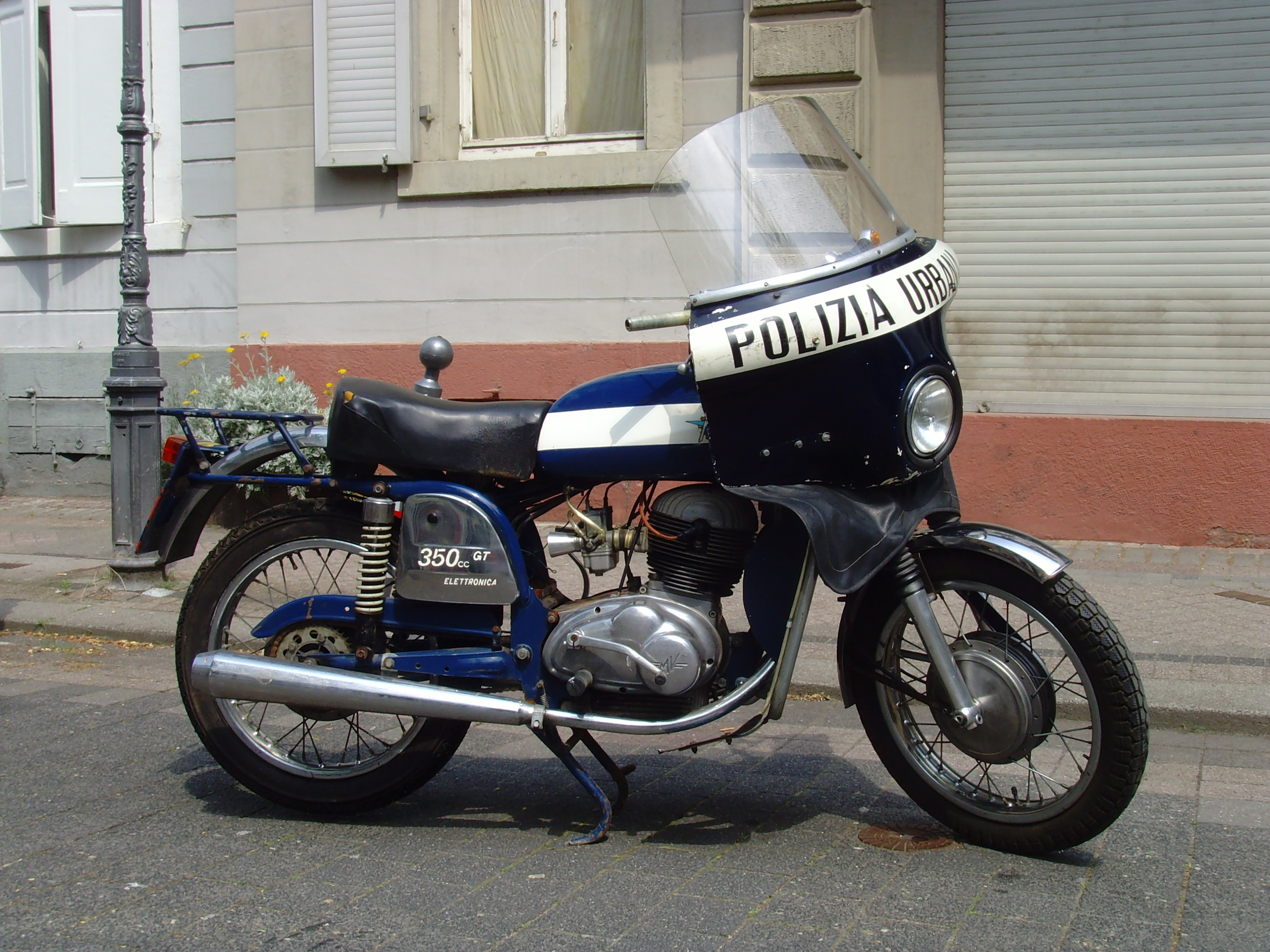
MV Agusta 350B Polizia Urbana

Produced for Italian law enforcement agencies, a special version of the 350B GT, the 350B Polizia Urbana, was fitted with a single seat, a wind shield and panniers. Optionally, crash bars, a siren and direction indicators could be fitted.

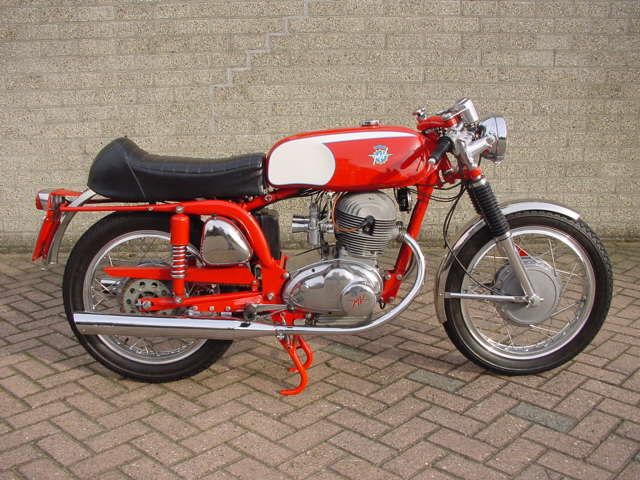
1971 MV Agusta 350 (2C) Supersport
