= Ducati 350 Mark 3 =

SOHC motorcycle by Ducati

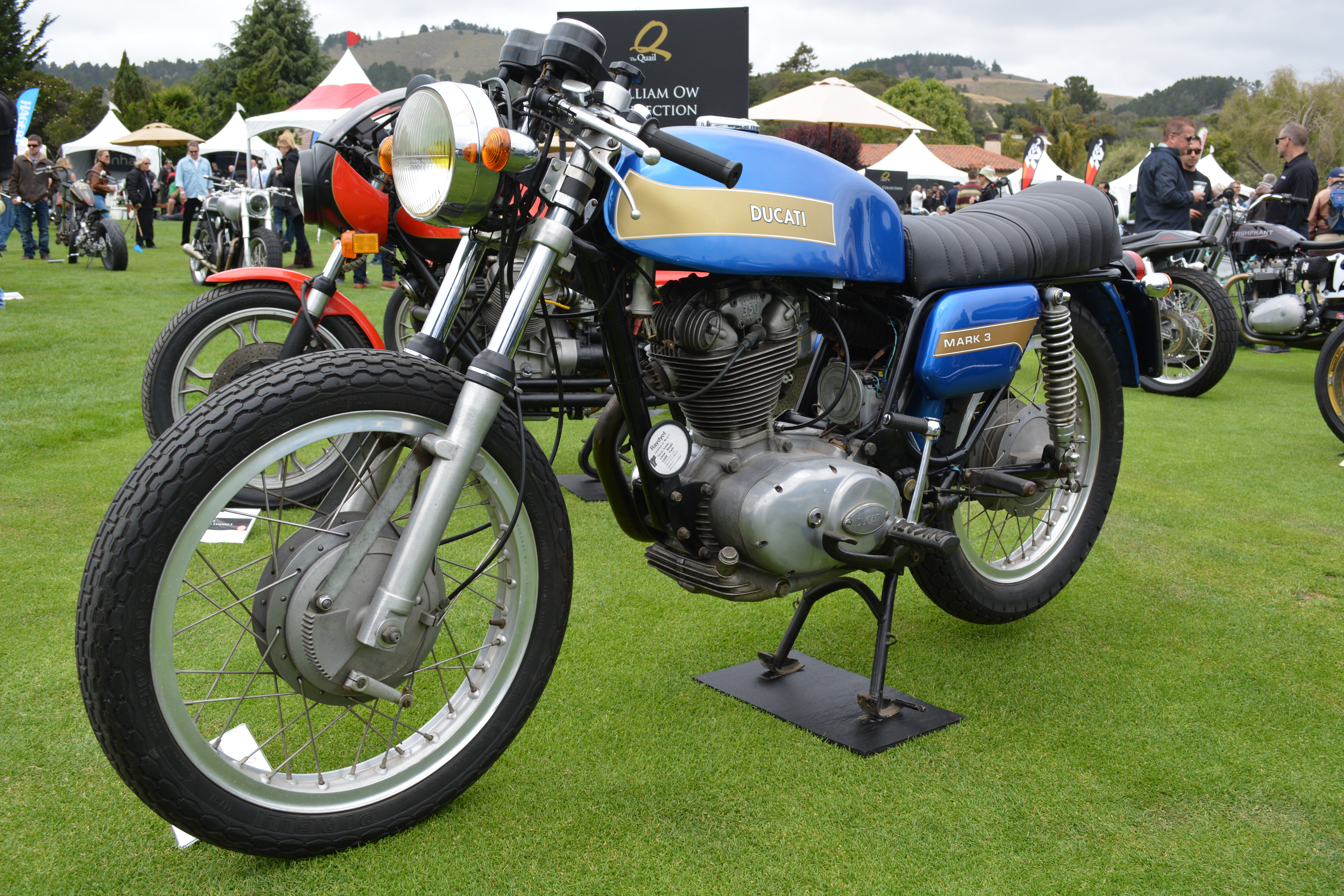
- Ducati 350 Mark 3 at the 2015 Quail Motorcycle Gathering
- Manufacturer: Ducati
- Production: 1968–1974
- Predecessor: Ducati Sebring
- Class: Standard
- Engine: 340 cc (21 cu in) Air-cooled bevel drive SOHC single cylinder four stroke
- Bore / stroke: 76 mm × 75 mm (3.0 in × 3.0 in)
- Compression ratio: 10:1
- Top speed: 150 km/h (93 mph)
- Power: 24 bhp (18 kW) @ 8,500 rpm
- Transmission: Multiplate wet clutch, 5 speed
- Frame type: Single cradle
- Suspension: Front: telescopic forks Rear: swinging arm
- Brakes: Drum front & rear
- Tyres: Front: 275x18 Rear: 300x18
- Wheelbase: 1,330 mm (52 in)
- Dimensions: L: 2,000 mm (79 in); W: 600 mm (24 in); H: 940 mm (37 in)
- Seat height: 735 mm (28.9 in)
- Weight: 128 kg (282 lb) (dry)

The Ducati 350 Mark 3 is a 340 cc (21 cu in) single cylinder bevel drive SOHC motorcycle produced by the Italian manufacturer Ducati from 1968 to 1974. It was one of the first 'wide case' Ducati singles produced. A higher performance version, the Ducati 350 Mark 3D, which used desmodromic valves was also available.

Total production was around 2,300 Mark 3s and 1,350 Mark 3Ds.

== History ==
Ducati had introduced the 350 Sebring in 1967 at the request of their American importer Berliner Motor Corporation (the US was Ducati's primary market at the time). The Sebring was an enlargement of the existing 250 cc model but designer Fabio Taglioni had concerns about the reliability of the bottom end, so the Sebring was produced in a mild state of tune.

Taglioni had designed strengthened versions of the engine for racing, culminating in the 1967 250SCD and 350SCD (Sport Corsa Desmo). The racing bikes used a duplex frame and the engine had wider mountings at the rear to match the twin rear tubes of the frame.

For 1968 Ducati introduced new engines to the 250 and 350 cc road bikes based on the racing engine. These retained the wider rear mountings and came to be known as 'wide case' engines.

Whilst sharing the same bore and stroke (76 mm × 75 mm (3.0 in × 3.0 in)) as the Sebring, the Mark 3 had a higher compression ratio, hotter cam and bigger carburettor. The 1968 Mark 3 had a Leopoldo Tartarini designed 'bread box' 13 L (2.9 imp gal; 3.4 US gal) petrol tank with twin filler caps. A single filler version was introduced in 1969.

Few Italian-made models were imported during 1970–71 as the importers (Berliner in the US and Vic Camp in the UK) were in dispute with the factory over prices. During this period Spanish-built MotoTrans models were imported.

A new tank was fitted for 1971 and in 1973 a revised dual seat, side covers, instruments and headlight which were similarly styled to the 750 GT. These machines were finished in blue and gold. 35 mm Marzocchi forks and a twin-sided Grimeca front brake were also fitted that year.

The factory ceased production of OHC singles in 1974. The remaining stocks were purchased by the then British importer Coburn & Hughes, who continued to sell them until early 1976. These last Mark 3s used an engine produced under licence by the Spanish company MotoTrans.

== Technical details ==
=== Engine and transmission ===
The single cylinder bevel drive OHC engine was of unit construction and had alloy head and alloy barrels with cast iron liners and was based on the 'wide case' engines used in the racers. Bore and stroke were 76 mm × 75 mm (3.0 in × 3.0 in) giving a displacement of 340 cc (21 cu in). A high compression 10:1 piston was fitted. Claimed power output was 24 bhp (18 kW) @ 8,500 rpm, giving the machine a top speed of 150 km/h (93 mph). The kickstart mechanism has been upgraded from the earlier models and a decompression lever fitted to non-desmo models to aid kicking the engine over.

Fuel was delivered by a 29 mm Dell'Orto carburettor. The engine used wet sump lubrication. Electronic ignition was fitted from 1973.

Primary drive was by helical gears to a multi-plate wet clutch and 5 speed gearbox. Chain drive took power to the rear wheel.

=== Cycle parts ===
The single cradle frame was a strengthened version of the 'narrow case' bikes and used the engine as a stressed member. Rear suspension was by swinging arm with twin 3-way adjustable Marzocchi shock absorbers. At the front 31.5 mm (1.24 in) telescopic forks were fitted. Brakes were drums, the front being 180 mm (7.1 in) diameter front and 160 mm (6.3 in) rear.

Wire wheels were fitted with 275x18 front and 300x18 rear tyres. A wider 350 section tyre was fitted in 1971 and the front wheel increased to 19" in 1973.

From 1972 35 mm (1.4 in) mm Marzocchi forks and a twin-sided Grimeca front brake were fitted.

== 350 Mark 3D ==
A higher performance version of the Mark 3 was offered, the Mark 3D, that was fitted with a different head that used desmodromic valves. (A system where the valves are positively closed by extra lobes on the cam and levers rather than by a more conventional springs). The head was derived from that used on the 350 SCD racers. Although using a desmo system, lightweight hairspring valve springs were retained. The rest of the engine was the same as the non-desmo Mark 3, as were the cycle parts. The 3D produced 34 bhp (25 kW) and had a top speed of 165 km/h (103 mph). Various options were available for this model, including a race kit, megaphone silencer and a fairing. With these fitted power increased to 36 bhp (27 kW) and a top speed to 180 kilometres per hour (110 mph).

In 1971 the Mark 3 and the desmo models diverged, the desmo becoming the 350 Desmo with cafe racer styling, although in some markets the two models were known as the Mark 3 Tourer and the Mark 3 Special. The Desmo had clip-on handlebars, a fibreglass tank and a ‘monoposto’ single seat. It was finished in ‘bowling ball’ metal flake silver which gave rise to it being nicknamed the silver shotgun.

A metal tank, different side panels and a combined seat and rear mudguard were fitted from 1973 and finished in the yellow and black colouring of the 750 S. In the final year of production, 1974, Ceriani front fork and a single 280 mm (11 in) Brembo disk brake were fitted.
