= Ducati 250 Mark 3 =

SOHC motorcycle by Ducati

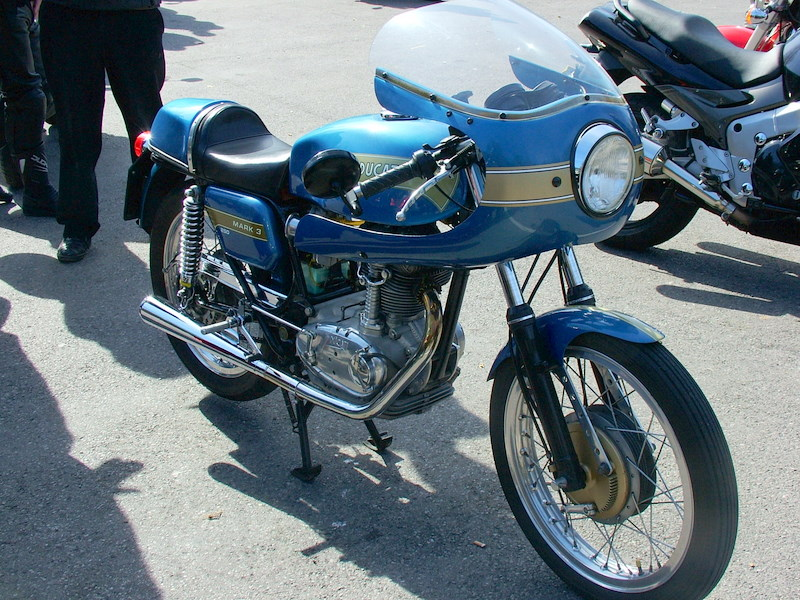
- Late model Ducati 250 Mark 3 fitted with a fairing
- Manufacturer: Ducati
- Production: 1967–1974
- Predecessor: Ducati Diana Mark 3 Ducati Mach 1
- Class: Standard
- Engine: 248.6 cc (15.17 cu in) Air-cooled bevel drive SOHC single cylinder four stroke
- Bore / stroke: 74 mm × 57.8 mm (2.91 in × 2.28 in)
- Compression ratio: 10:1
- Top speed: 145 km/h (90 mph)
- Power: 30 bhp (22 kW)
- Transmission: Multiplate wet clutch, 5 speed
- Frame type: Single cradle
- Suspension: Front: telescopic forks Rear: swinging arm
- Brakes: Drum front & rear
- Tyres: Front: 275x18 Rear: 300x18
- Wheelbase: 1,360 mm (54 in)
- Dimensions: L: 2,000 mm (79 in); W: 780 mm (31 in); H: 940 mm (37 in)
- Seat height: 735 mm (28.9 in)
- Weight: 128 kg (282 lb) (dry)

The Ducati 250 Mark 3 is a 249 cc (15.2 cu in) single cylinder bevel drive SOHC motorcycle produced by the Italian manufacturer Ducati from 1967 to 1974. Initially produced using the 'narrow case' engine, the newly introduced 'wide case' engine was used from 1968. A higher performance version, the Ducati 250 Mark 3D, which used desmodromic valves was also available.

Total production was around 2,800 Mark 3s and 1,300 Mark 3Ds.

== History ==
Introduced in 1967, the Mark 3 replaced the American high performance 250, the Diana Mark 3, and its European counterpart the Mach 1. Similar to the Diana Mark 3, the new model used the dynamo and coil ignition of the Mach 1 rather than the flywheel magneto and generator of the Diana.

The American motorcycle market slumped and in 1967 the Ducati importers, Berliner Motor Corporation, were in financial trouble and refused a consignment of 3,500 machines from the factory. These machines were sold to Liverpool businessman Bill Hannah, who sold the bikes to the public between 1968 and 1972. Some of these were Mark 3s, which were sold at a discounted price. Hannah offered no support or spares network for the bikes he sold which damaged Ducati's reputation in the UK.

Ducati designer Fabio Taglioni had designed strengthened versions of the engine for racing, culminating in the 1967 250SCD and 350SCD (Sport Corsa Desmo). The racing bikes used a duplex frame and the engine had wider mountings at the rear to match the twin rear tubes of the frame.

For 1968 Ducati introduced new engines to the 250 and 350 cc road bikes based on the racing engine. These retained the wider rear mountings and came to be known as 'wide case' engines. The 1968 Mark 3 had a Leopoldo Tartarini designed 'bread box' 13 L (2.9 imp gal; 3.4 US gal) petrol tank with twin filler caps. A single filler version was introduced in 1969.

Few Italian-made models were imported to the UK and US during 1970–71 as the importers (Berliner in the US and Vic Camp in the UK) were in dispute with the factory over prices. During this period Spanish-built MotoTrans models were imported.

A new tank was fitted for 1971 and in 1973 a revised dual seat, side covers, instruments and headlight which were similarly styled to the 750 GT. These machines were finished in blue and gold. 35 mm Marzocchi forks and a twin-sided Grimeca front brake were also fitted that year.

== Technical details ==
=== Engine and transmission ===
The single cylinder bevel drive OHC engine was of unit construction and had alloy head and alloy barrel with cast iron liners. Bore and stroke were 74 mm × 57.8 mm (2.91 in × 2.28 in) giving a displacement of 249 cc (15.2 cu in). A high compression 10:1 piston was fitted. Claimed power output was 30 bhp (22 kW), giving the machine a top speed of 145 km/h (90 mph).

The 'wide case' engine was introduced in 1968. Although the specifications were similar to the 'narrow case' engine, the new engine had a stronger bottom end with bigger main bearings and big end. Capacity of the wet sump was increased from 4 to 5.5 pints and the kickstart mechanism has been upgraded from the earlier models.

Fuel was delivered by a 29 mm Dell'Orto carburettor. Electronic ignition was fitted from 1973.

Primary drive was by helical gears to a multi-plate wet clutch and 5 speed gearbox. Chain drive took power to the rear wheel.

=== Cycle parts ===
The single cradle frame used the engine as a stressed member. When the wide case engine was introduced the frame was modified for the wider rear mountings and twin rear loops were added which made the frame stronger and stiffer.

Rear suspension was by swinging arm with twin 3-way adjustable Marzocchi shock absorbers. At the front 31.5 mm (1.24 in) telescopic forks were fitted. Brakes were drums, the front being 180 mm (7.1 in) diameter front and 160 mm (6.3 in) rear. A twin-sided Grimeca front brake was used from 1973.

== 250 Mark 3D ==
A higher performance version of the Mark 3 was offered, the Mark 3D, that was fitted with a different head that used desmodromic valves. (A system where the valves are positively closed by extra lobes on the cam and levers rather than by a more conventional springs). The head was derived from that used on the 350 SCD racers. Although using a desmo system, lightweight hairspring valve springs were retained. The rest of the engine was the same as the non-desmo Mark 3, as were the cycle parts.

In 1971 the Mark 3 and the desmo models diverged, the desmo becoming the 250 Desmo with cafe racer styling, although in some markets the two models were known as the Mark 3 Tourer and the Mark 3 Special. The Desmo had clip-on handlebars, a fibreglass tank and a ‘monoposto’ single seat. It was finished in ‘bowling ball’ metal flake silver which gave rise to it being nicknamed the silver shotgun.

A metal tank, different side panels and a combined seat and rear mudguard were fitted from 1973 and finished in the yellow and black colouring of the 750 S. In the final year of production, 1974, Ceriani front fork and a single 280 mm (11 in) Brembo disk brake were fitted.
