= Ducati Monza =

SOHC motorcycle by Ducati

- Manufacturer: Ducati
- Production: 1961-1968
- Class: Standard
- Engine: Air-cooled bevel drive SOHC single cylinder four stroke
- Bore / stroke: 74 mm × 57.8 mm (2.91 in × 2.28 in)
- Compression ratio: 8:1
- Top speed: 128 km/h (80 mph)
- Power: 22 bhp (16 kW) @7200 rpm
- Transmission: Multiplate wet clutch, 4 speed (1961-64) 5 speed (1965-68)
- Frame type: Single cradle
- Suspension: Front: telescopic forks Rear: swinging arm
- Brakes: Drum front & rear
- Tyres: Front: 275x18 Rear: 300x18
- Wheelbase: 1,320 mm (52 in)
- Dimensions: L: 2,000 mm (79 in); W: 800 mm (31 in)
- Seat height: 800 mm (31 in)
- Weight: 125 kg (276 lb) (dry)

The Ducati Monza is a 249 cc (15.2 cu in) single cylinder bevel drive SOHC motorcycle produced by the Italian manufacturer Ducati from 1961 to 1968. It was the touring version of Ducati's first 250 cc road bike. Reviews of the Monza praised its speed, road holding, engine smoothness and brakes.

== History ==
Following the success in racing of the 250 F3, and using an engine based on that of the racer, Ducati introduced its first 250 cc road bikes at the April 1961 Milan Fair. The bikes were offered in two versions, the touring Monza and sports Diana. The Monza has a softer cam, a more padded seat, deeper mudguards, higher handlebars and a smaller tank.

The 1963 US model was finished in black and chrome.

In 1964 the electrics were updated and the kick start ratio was changed. The gearbox was changed to a 5 speed unit in 1965, along with a smaller 13 L (2.9 imp gal; 3.4 US gal) tank.

The styling was updated in 1966 with a new tank, more padded seat, side panels and front and rear lights. The styling was shared with the Monza Junior and the Sebring.

A square headlight was fitted in 1967 and 68.

The American motorcycle market slumped and in 1967 Ducati importers, Berliner Motor Corporation were in financial trouble and refused a consignment of 3,500 machines from the factory. These machines were sold to Liverpool businessman Bill Hannah, who sold the bikes to the public between 1968 and 1972. Some of these were Monzas which were sold at a discounted price. Hannah offered no support or spares network for the bikes he sold which damaged Ducati's reputation in the UK.

The bike was fitted with the improved 'wide case' engine in 1968, the final year of productions. Two versions were made of the Monza, one for the US and the other for Europe.

== Technical details ==
=== Engine and transmission ===
The single cylinder bevel drive OHC engine was of unit construction and had alloy head and alloy barrels with cast iron liners. Ball bearings were used in the main bearings and big end and hairspring valve springs were used to close the valves. Bore and stroke were 74 mm × 57.8 mm (2.91 in × 2.28 in) giving a displacement of 248 cc (15.1 cu in). Compression ratio was 8:1. Claimed power output was 22 bhp (16 kW) @7,200 rpm, giving the machine a top speed of 128 km/h (80 mph).

Fuel was delivered by a 24 mm Dell'Orto UFB carburettor. Wet sump lubrication was used and ignition was by battery and coil with the points under a cover on the right hand side of the engine.

Primary drive was by helical gears to a multi-plate wet clutch and 4 speed gearbox. A 5 speed cluster was fitted from 1965. Chain drive took power to the rear wheel.

The 'wide case' engine was introduced in 1968, the last year of production. Although the specifications were similar to the 'narrow case' engine, the new engine had a stronger bottom end with bigger main bearings and big end. Capacity of the wet sump was increased from 4 to 5.5 pints and the kickstart mechanism has been upgraded from the earlier models.

=== Cycle parts ===
The single cradle frame used the engine as a stressed member. When the wide case engine was introduced the frame was modified for the wider rear mountings and twin rear loops were added which made the frame stronger and stiffer. Rear suspension was by swinging arm with twin 3-way adjustable Marzocchi shock absorbers. At the front Marzocchi telescopic forks were fitted. Brakes were drums, the front being 180 mm (7.1 in) diameter and the rear 160 mm (6.3 in).
