= MV Agusta 125 Sport SE =

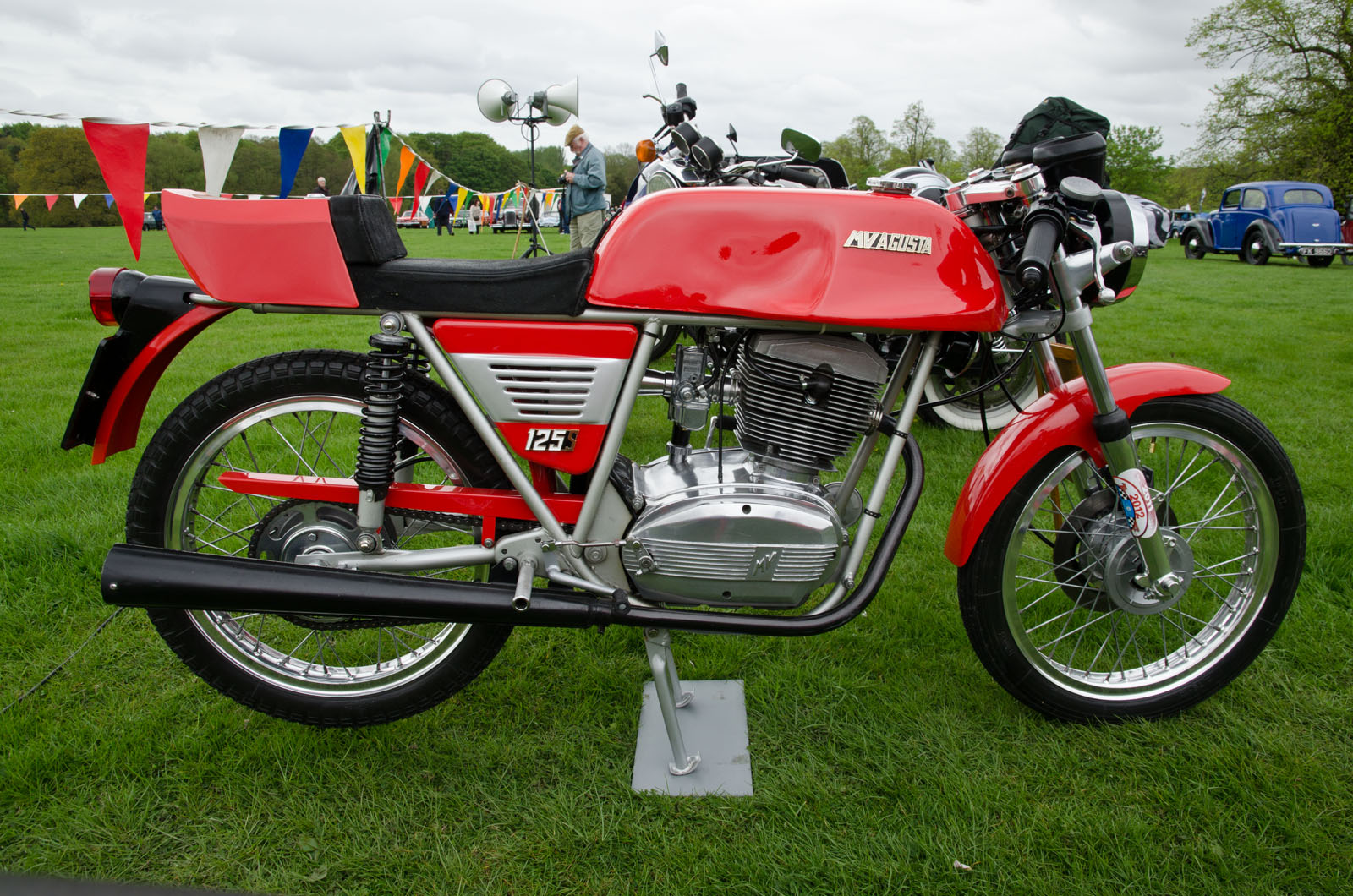
- MV Agusta 125 Sport SE
- Manufacturer: MV Agusta
- Production: 1975-1977
- Predecessor: 125 Sport GTL-S
- Class: Sport bike
- Engine: 123.5 cc (8 cu in) Single-cylinder OHV four-stroke
- Bore / stroke: 53 mm × 56 mm (2.1 in × 2.2 in)
- Compression ratio: 10.5:1
- Power: 14 bhp (10 kW) @ 8,500 rpm
- Ignition type: Electronic ignition
- Transmission: Wet, multi-plate clutch, unit construction 5-speed gearbox, chain drive
- Frame type: Double cradle
- Suspension: Front: Telescopic forks Rear: swinging arm with hydraulic dampers
- Brakes: Front: 230 mm disc brake Rear: 136 mm drum brake
- Tires: Front: 2.75 x 18; Rear; 2.75 x 18
- Wheelbase: 1,300 mm
- Dimensions: L: 1,940 mm W: 620 mm
- Weight: 243 lb (110 kg) (dry)

The MV Agusta 125 Sport SE was a sport motorcycle built from 1975 to 1977 by the Italian manufacturer MV Agusta. It was one of the last models to be produced by Meccanica Verghera at their Cascina Costa plant.

== Background ==
125 cc was a popular class in Italy, MV having produced four-stroke 125s since 1954, including sports models such as the "125 Rapido Sport" model, produced from the second half of the 1950s, and the "GTLS" of the early 1970s.

Following the death of Count Domenico Agusta in 1971, the financial situation of MV Agusta suffered a rapid decline, brought on by competition from low cost, high quality Japanese motorcycles and ongoing labour problems. For 1975, MV Agusta range was reduced to 3 models, all of which were new. They were presented at a press conference in Milan by Corrado Agusta and senior MV staff. The three new models were the 750 Sport America, built at the request of Chris Garville and Jim Cotherman of Commerce Overseas Corporation, the US MV importers; the 350 Ipotesi, styled by Italian designer Giorgetto Giugiaro (who had previously designed the Suzuki RE5); and the 125 Sport SE, which was styled along the lines of the Ipotesi.

Although these new model were presented as the beginning of a new era for MV and the start of an ambitious programme of releasing road bikes based on the GP machines, MV Agusta stopped manufacturing motorcycles in 1977.

== Model Details ==
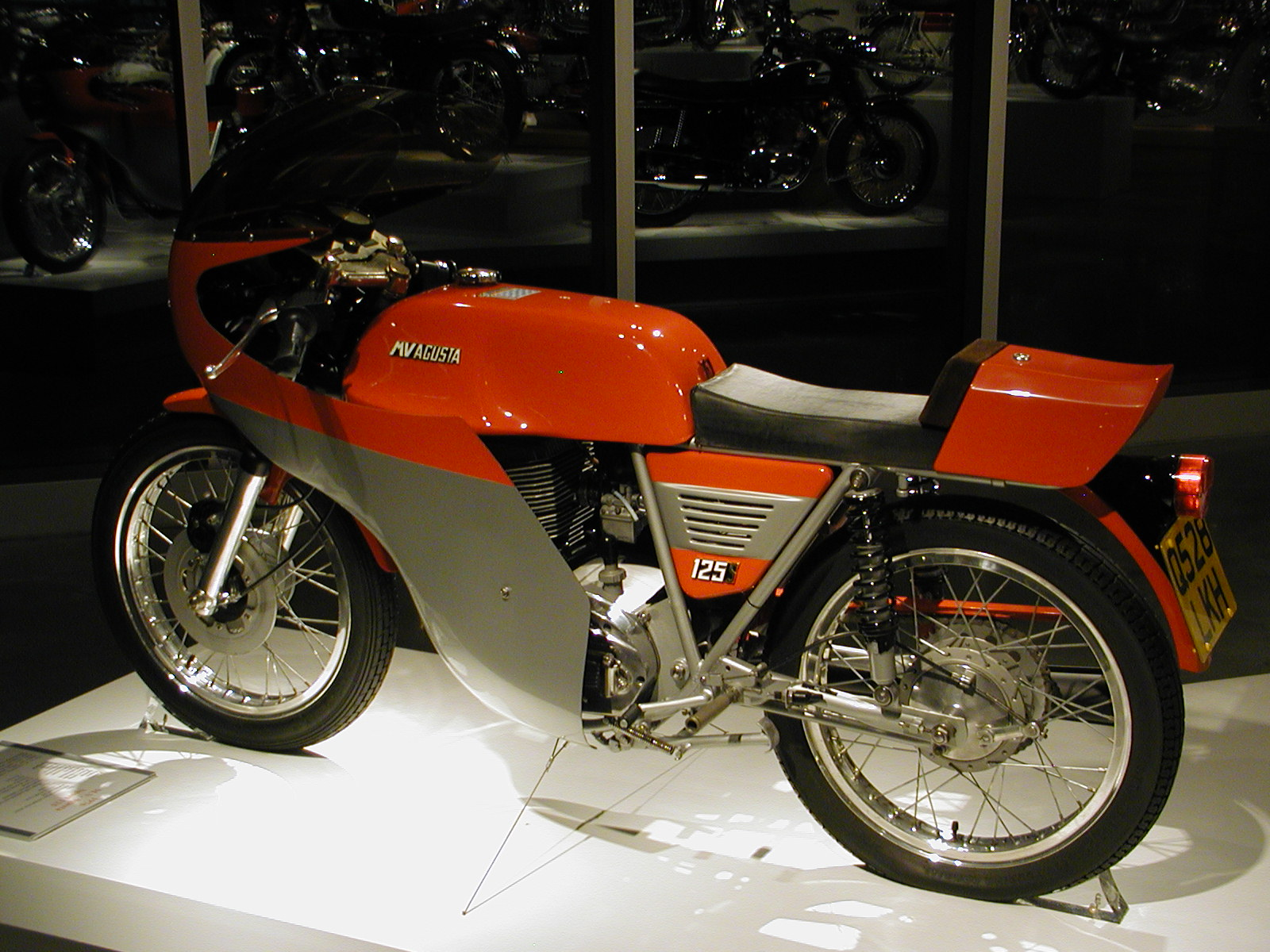
1976 MV Agusta Sport SE with optional fairing.

Developed from the 125 Sport GTL-S, the machine followed the striking horizontal lines and sharp contours of Giugiaro's Ipotesi. Departing from MV's usual practice of using a mixture of sheet and tubular steel frame a new all tube frame was used, which was finished in silver. Like the Ipotesi, a humped seat with the rear mudguard attached and side panels with slots were fitted. Ceriani front forks and a Scarab disc brake gave the front end a modern look.

Although the single-cylinder engine's heritage dates back to the 1950s Centomila (so called because MV Agusta claimed the engine was capable of exceeding 100,000 km), the engine featured new, squarer casings. A square alloy cylinder was fitted with a matching square cylinder head. The pushrod engine retained the 53 x 56 mm bore and stroke of previous engines. Compression ratio was raised to 10.5:1 and, breathing through a 24 mm carburettor, power output was 14 bhp (10 kW) @ 8,500 rpm. Electronic ignition was fitted and the gearbox has 5 speeds.

The machine was finished in red and silver with a silver frame and a black exhaust, the traditional colours of the MV GP machines. A fairing was offered as an optional extra.

== Bibliography ==
- Falloon, Ian (2011). The Book of the Classic MV Agusta Fours. Veloce Publishing Ltd. ISBN 9781845842031.
- Walker, Mick (1998). Mick Walker's Italian Racing Motorcycles. Redline Books. ISBN 9780953131112.
