= Ducati Diana =

SOHC motorcycle by Ducati

- Manufacturer: Ducati
- Also called: Ducati Daytona (UK)
- Production: 1961–1964
- Successor: Ducati Diana Mark 3 (US); Ducati Mach 1 (Europe)
- Class: sports
- Engine: Air-cooled bevel drive SOHC single cylinder four stroke
- Bore / stroke: 74 mm × 57.8 mm (2.91 in × 2.28 in)
- Compression ratio: 8:1
- Top speed: 85 mph (137 km/h)
- Power: 24 bhp (18 kW)
- Transmission: Multiplate wet clutch, 4 speed
- Frame type: Single cradle
- Suspension: Front: telescopic forks Rear: swinging arm
- Brakes: Drum front & rear
- Tyres: Front: 275x18 Rear: 300x18
- Wheelbase: 1,330 mm (52 in)
- Dimensions: L: 1,980 mm (78 in); W: 680 mm (27 in); H: 930 mm (37 in)
- Seat height: 750 mm (30 in)
- Weight: 120 kg (260 lb) (dry)

The Ducati Diana, known as the Ducati Daytona in the United Kingdom, is a 249 cc (15.2 cu in) single cylinder bevel drive SOHC motorcycle produced by the Italian manufacturer Ducati from 1961 to 1964. It was the sports version of Ducati's first 250 cc road bike. It was replaced in 1962 by the higher performance Ducati Diana Mark 3 in the US and by the Ducati Mach 1 in Europe in September 1964.

== History ==
Following the success in racing of the 250 F3, and using an engine based on that of the racer, Ducati introduced its first 250 cc road bikes at the April 1961 Milan Fair. The bikes were offered in two versions, the touring Monza and sports Diana. The Diana was styled by Renzo Neri and had rear-set controls, clip-on handlebars, a steel 15 L (3.3 imp gal; 4.0 US gal) petrol tank and sporting mudguards. The bike had a blue frame and was finished in blue and silver.

A tuning kit was available for the Diana and included a high compression 9:1 piston, a 27mm Dell'Orto SS1 carburettor and megaphone silencer. Motorcycle Mechanics magazine road tested a Diana with the tuning kit installed and recorded a top speed of over 100 mph (160 km/h).

== Technical details ==
=== Engine and transmission ===
The single cylinder bevel drive OHC engine was of unit construction and had alloy head and alloy barrels with cast iron liners. Ball bearings were used in the main bearings and big end and hairspring valve springs were used to close the valves. Bore and stroke were 74 mm × 57.8 mm (2.91 in × 2.28 in) giving a displacement of 248 cc (15.1 cu in). Compression ratio was 8:1. Claimed power output was 24 bhp (18 kW), giving the machine a top speed of 85 mph (137 km/h).

Fuel was delivered by a 24 mm Dell'Orto UFB carburettor. Wet sump lubrication was used and ignition was by battery and coil with the points under a cover on the right hand side of the engine.

Primary drive was by helical gears to a multi-plate wet clutch and 4 speed gearbox. Chain drive took power to the rear wheel.

=== Cycle parts ===
The single cradle frame used the engine as a stressed member. Rear suspension was by swinging arm with twin 3-way adjustable Marzocchi shock absorbers. At the front 31.5 mm (1.24 in) telescopic forks were fitted. Brakes were drums, the front being 180 mm (7.1 in) diameter and the rear 160 mm (6.3 in).
