= Mick Walker (motorcycling) =

English motorcycle writer

- Walker in 1976 on a Moto Guzzi 850T3, in front of his then-newly acquired larger retail motorcycle premises at Norwich Road, Wisbech
- Born: Michael John Gilbert Walker; 30 November 1942; Wretton, Norfolk
- Died: 8 March 2012 (aged 69)
- Known for: Author, motorcycle dealer, motorcycle racer
- Military career
- Allegiance: UK
- Branch: Royal Air Force
- Service years: 1958–1968

Michael John Gilbert Walker (30 November 1942 – 8 March 2012), commonly known as Mick Walker, was acknowledged as one of the world's leading motorcycle authorities. Walker was a British former motorcycle dealer and racer with a particular interest in Italian motorcycles, who played a key role in popularising the Ducati marque in Britain, but was also an expert on numerous other models of motorcycle dating from the 1950s to the present. He was the writer of over 130 published books about motorcycles and motorcycle racing, and an autobiography.

== Early life ==
Walker was born 30 November 1942 in Wretton, Norfolk, England and was educated at Downham Market Secondary Modern School. After leaving full-time education at the age of 15, he joined the Royal Air Force in 1958, serving in the UK, Aden and Cyprus. Walker's first powered two-wheeler was a Lambretta Li150 scooter purchased in 1960 to access his home from the RAF base, and he bought his first motorcycle, the second Ducati 250 Daytona to arrive in the UK (known as a Diana in most markets) in 1961.

== Racing ==
Walker began racing competitively in 1963, while serving with the RAF and continued riding in club and international events until 1972 with considerable success at circuits such as Snetterton, Cadwell Park (where he made headlines in Motor Cycle News by winning three club races at one meeting in October 1968) and Silverstone and also competed in the Manx Grand Prix. He was a personal friend of many motorcycle stars of the era including Mike Hailwood, Barry Sheene, and Arthur Wheeler. Later, after he became a motorcycle dealer, Walker sponsored other riders. Following the death of his son Gary in a start line incident at Brands Hatch in 1994, he set up the Mick Walker Racing team to mentor young British talent. Among its pupils were Darren North, Ollie Bridewell, Dijon Compton, Steven Neate, James Toseland, Tom Tunstall and Dean Johnson who won the 1995 Superteen Championship.

== Mick Walker Motorcycles ==
After leaving the RAF in 1968, Walker spent a short period working in factories in Cambridgeshire before starting his own business, Mick Walker Motorcycles, dealing in Ducati spares and repairs – initially from a garden shed. After moving to shop premises, and acquiring some of the stock diverted from the US market by the Berliner Motor Corporation, the business – which was based in Wisbech, Cambridge – expanded steadily and Walker became the official UK importer for Ducati spares in the mid-1970s. With greatly enlarged premises, Mick Walker Motorcycles moved on to retailing models manufactured by Ducati, Moto Guzzi, Harley-Davidson, Aermacchi, Cagiva, Benelli, Garelli, Testi, MV Agusta, Jawa and Derbi, as well as Russian motorcycles, and was the UK importer for several marques. The Mick Walker Group became a victim of the recession of the early 1980s and ceased to trade at the start of 1982. However, Walker continued to provide Ducati parts and servicing with his brother Rick (as Rick & Mick Walker) until 2005.

== Writing career ==
Following the closure of his motorcycle dealership, Walker began writing about motorcycles and was appointed Assistant Editor of the British magazine Motorcycle Enthusiast in 1983. His first book Ducati Singles was published in 1985, and he went on to become one of the most prolific motorcycle writers in the world, gaining a reputation for detailed and meticulous research. Unusually, Walker's work is all written in longhand. He was interviewed by the BBC after the publication of his 100th title.

== Favourite bikes ==
In a 1994 interview with Motor Cycle News, Walker confirmed his then-current road bike – a Yamaha FZ750 – as having a "superb" motor, handling and braking. His best ride was a 1970s 125 Derbi racer, and the machine he would most like to ride was the Mike Hailwood 297 Honda Six. His most unreliable was a BSA B50 Gold Star which failed on the way to the TT races, being swiftly replaced for the trip by his Ducati 160 Monza Junior.

He described his relief that, although he had crashed his 250 Ducati Mach 1 at around 120 mph during practising for the 1966 Manx Grand Prix, it was on the Sulby Straight where he slid in a straight line without impacting the sides, adding "anywhere else on the course and it would heve been curtains for me".

== Honours and awards ==
Mick Walker retained strong links with the Italian motorcycle industry, and in 1998 was one of the 50 VIPs invited to Italy to celebrate Ducati's half-century in production. That same year, he played an instrumental role in setting up The Art of the Motorcycle exhibition at the Guggenheim Museum in New York, writing around one-third of the entries in the catalogue. In 1999, the British Ducati Owner's Club presented him with a Lifetime Achievement Award, the first of its kind ever made. In 2000, his part in helping to set up a major Ducati exhibition at the University of Northumbria Gallery was acknowledged by director Mara-Helen Wood, who was 'indebted to Mick Walker, Ducati author, historian and consultant, whose involvement was crucial to the success of the Expo'.

== Bibliography ==
Walker wrote over 130 books, starting with Ducati Singles in 1985 and ending with his autobiography Mick Walker the Ride of My Life, completed before his death in 2012 but published a few days after. Many of Walker's books were motorcycle marque histories, although he also wrote restoration guides and biographies of a number of racing stars, including Giacomo Agostini, Geoff Duke, Bob McIntyre, Sammy Miller and John Surtees.

=== Partial listing ===
- Walker, Mick (1985). Ducati Singles: All Two- and Four-stroke Single-cylinder Motorcycles Including Mototrans – 1945 Onwards. Osprey. ISBN 0-85045-605-3.
- Walker, Mick (2012). Mick Walker the Ride of My Life. Redline. ISBN 978-0-9555278-2-1.
- Walker, Mick (1994). Cafe Racers of the 1960s. The Crowood Press Ltd. ISBN 978-1-87200-419-8.
- Walker, Mick (1994). Cafe Racers of the 1970s. The Crowood Press Ltd. ISBN 978-1-84797-283-5.
