= MV Agusta 350 Ipotesi =

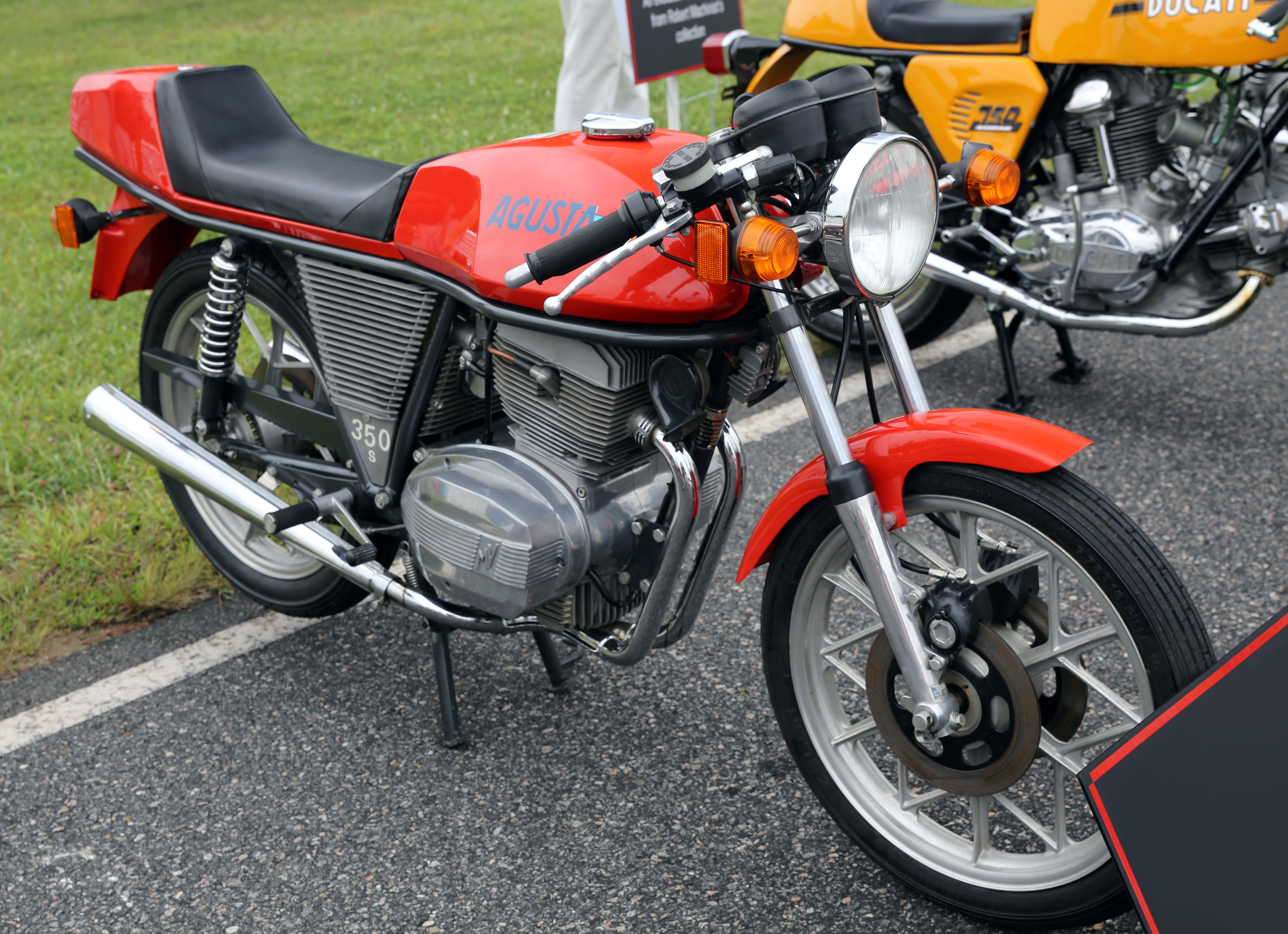
- Manufacturer: MV Agusta
- Also called: 1975 MV Agusta 350 Ipotesi
- Production: 1975-1977
- Predecessor: MV Agusta 350B
- Engine: 349 cc (21 cu in) four-stroke OHV parallel twin
- Bore / stroke: 63 mm × 56 mm (2.5 in × 2.2 in)
- Compression ratio: 9.2:1
- Top speed: 160 km/h (99 mph)
- Power: 34 hp (25 kW) @ 8,500 rpm
- Transmission: Wet, multi-plate clutch, unit construction 5-speed gearbox, chain drive
- Suspension: Front: Ceriani Teledraulic forks Rear: swinging arm with hydraulic dampers
- Brakes: Front: 230 mm twin disc brakes Rear: 230 mm disc brake (GT model: 200 mm drum brake)
- Tires: Front: 2.75 x 18; Rear: 3.25 x 18
- Wheelbase: 1,310 mm
- Dimensions: L: 1,970 mm W: 620 mm
- Weight: 160 kg (353 lb) (dry)
- Fuel capacity: 16 l

The MV Agusta 350 Ipotesi (Hypothesis) was a motorcycle produced by the Italian manufacturer MV Agusta from 1975 to 1977. The machine was conceived by Italian designer Giorgetto Giugiaro and based on the previous 350 B Sport Elettronica model. 1,991 "Sports" and 350 “Turismo” machines were produced.

== Background ==
Following the death of Count Domenico Agusta in 1971, the financial situation of MV Agusta suffered a rapid decline, brought on by competition from low cost, high quality Japanese motorcycles and ongoing labour problems. Giorgetto Giugiaro (who had previously designed the Suzuki RE5) of design studio Italdesign Giugiaro was commissioned to produce an attractive, more modern design to increase MV's competitiveness in the middle-weight sector. The prototype had striking horizontal lines and sharp contours. The concept machine was first shown at the 1973 Milan EICMA Motorcycle Show.

== Features ==
Developed from the 350 B models, the 350 cc four-stroke OHV parallel twin featured new casings to match the styling of the machine. The angular cylinder heads, matching the straight lines of the machine, completed the then state-of-the-art concept. Power output was increased from 27 hp (20 kW) @ 7,800 rpm to 34 hp @ 8,500 rpm.

A new frame was produced using steel tubing only (previous models had used tube and sheet steel). Tank, seat and side panels were all new. The seat had the rear mudguard attached and the side panels were slotted, mimicking the cooling fins of the engine.

Scarab disc brakes were fitted, twin at the front and single rear. Ceriani forks and cast alloy wheels were also fitted. This was the first Italian production bike with 3 disc brakes and alloy wheels.

A full fairing was also available as an option.

== 350 Ipotesi GT ==
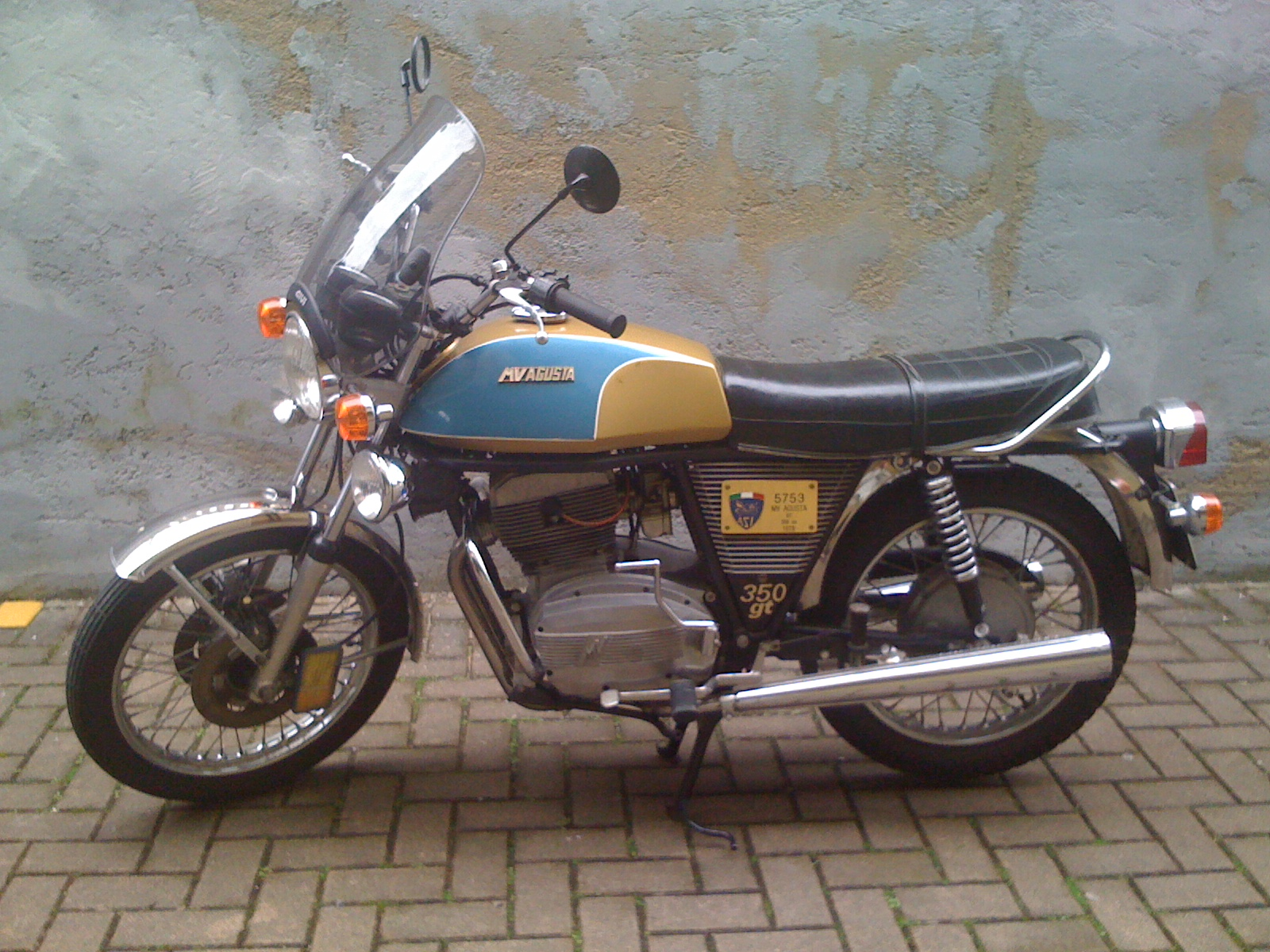
MV Agusta 350 Ipotesi GT

A touring version, the 350 Ipotesi GT, which was also known as the 350 Ipotesi Turismo was also produced. A more conventional rear seat was used, with a separate rear mudguard and higher handlebars were fitted. The mudguards and exhaust were finished in chrome, as opposed to painted on the sport model. A different tank was fitted, which was finished in gold and blue.

The twin front discs were retained, but a drum brake was used on the rear. Wire wheels were fitted.

== Hansen & Schneider special models ==
German MV Agusta importer Hansen & Schneider, obtained rights to manufacture MV Agusta motorcycles in the mid-1970s. They produced two 500 cc variants of the Ipotesi.

- MV Agusta 500 S (1976-77): The 350 cc engine's bore was increased to 75 mm, giving a displacement of 472 cc and a power output of 53 hp (39 kW) @ 8,900 rpm. Larger 3.00x18 front and 3.50x18 rear tyres were fitted. An optional reduced-power version with 43 hp (32 kW) @ 8,200 rpm was available.
- MV Agusta 500 SS (1977): a racing version was offered to special order. The machine had a completely revised engine with double overhead camshafts and produced 66 hp @ 11,100 rpm. Five examples were built.

== Bibliography ==
- Colombo, Mario; Patrignani, Roberto (2000). MV Agusta (in German) (Aufl ed.). Motorbuch-Verl. ISBN 978-3613014169.
- Schwab, Ulrich (1987). Motorräder : 1970-1987; Typen, Daten u. Preise in Deutschland (in German) (1. Aufl ed.). Motorbuch-Verlag. ISBN 9783613011724.
- Walker, Mick (1998). Mick Walker's Italian Racing Motorcycles. Redline Books. ISBN 9780953131112.
- Motorrad Katalog 1977. Motorpresse, München. 1977.
