= Ducati Sebring =

SOHC motorcycle by Ducati

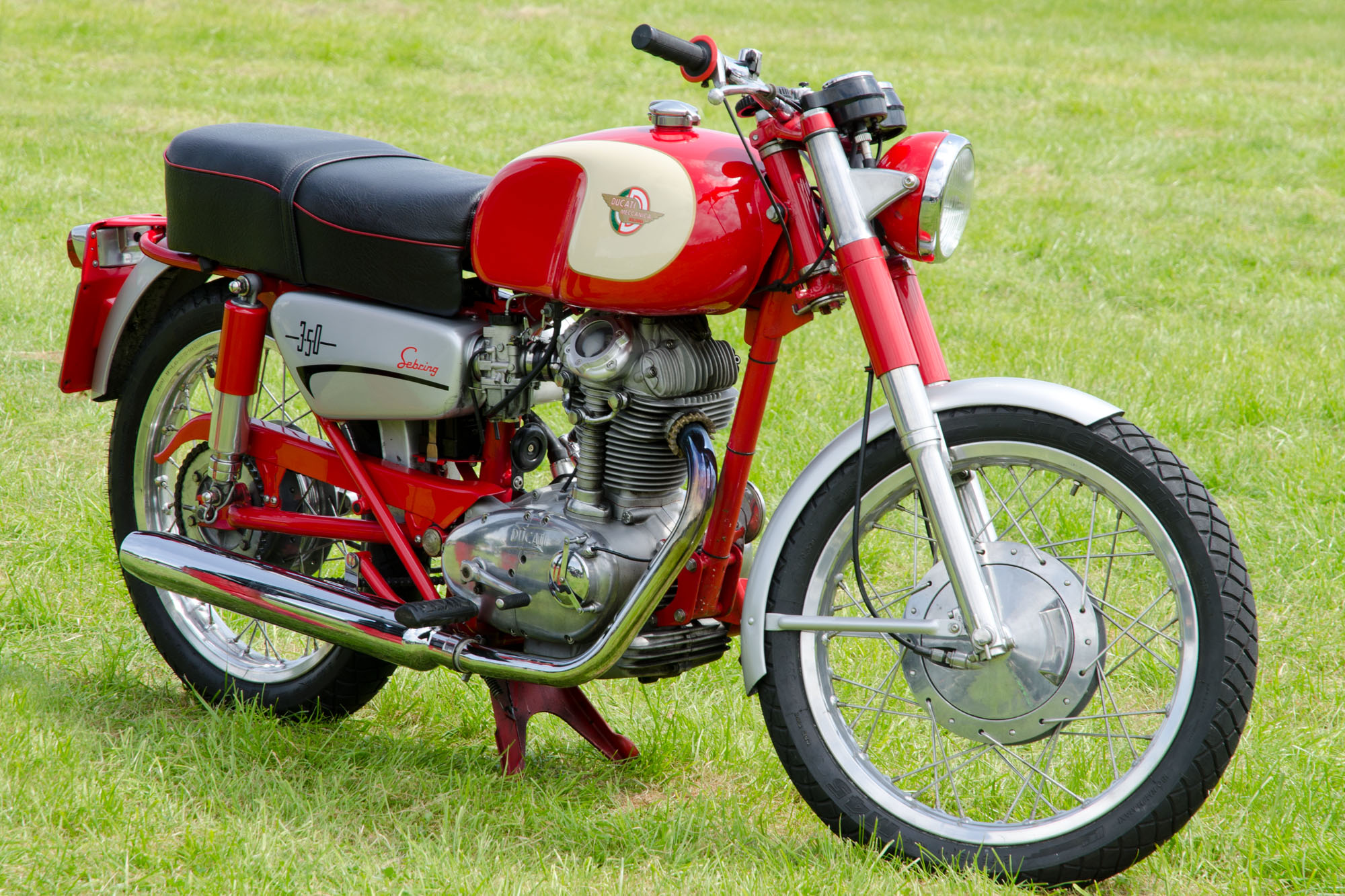
- Ducati Sebring at the 2014 Hoghton Tower Classic Car Show
- Manufacturer: Ducati
- Production: 1965–1968
- Successor: Ducati 350 Mark 3
- Class: Standard
- Engine: Air-cooled bevel drive SOHC single cylinder four stroke
- Bore / stroke: 76 mm × 75 mm (3.0 in × 3.0 in)
- Compression ratio: 8.5:1
- Top speed: 78 mph (126 km/h)
- Power: 20 bhp (15 kW) @ 6,250 rpm
- Transmission: Multiplate wet clutch, 5 speed
- Frame type: Single cradle
- Suspension: Front: telescopic forks Rear: swinging arm
- Brakes: Drum front & rear
- Tyres: Front: 275x18 Rear: 325x18
- Wheelbase: 1,330 mm (52 in)
- Dimensions: L: 2,000 mm (79 in); H: 1,070 mm (42 in)
- Seat height: 800 mm (31 in)
- Weight: 123 kg (271 lb) (dry)
- Fuel capacity: 17 L (3.7 imp gal; 4.5 US gal)

The Ducati Sebring is a 340 cc (21 cu in) single cylinder bevel drive SOHC motorcycle produced by the Italian manufacturer Ducati from 1965 to 1968. At the time of its introduction it was the largest capacity Ducati machine. Production of the original model ended in 1967 when the 'wide case' Mark 3 was introduced, although just over 200 Sebrings were made in 1968 with the 'wide case' engine. Total production was around 3,500 machines.

== History ==
Ducati's primary market at the time was the US. Their American importers, Berliner Motor Corporation, had been importing the Fabio Taglioni designed range of singles, the largest of which had a displacement of 250 cc. For 1965 Berliner had requested a larger version. Taglioni stretched the 250 to 340 cc but had concerns about the reliability of the bottom end, so the Sebring was produced in a mild state of tune with soft camshafts, small valves and a restrictive 24 mm carburettor.

It was a practice of Ducati at the time to name models after race circuits where they had won. Works rider Franco Farne had competed in a 251-700 cc race at Sebring on a 350RC racer, finishing 11th overall and winning the 350 class. The Sebring was named after this race (although the 350RC racer had little in common with the roadster).

When launched in 1965 the bike shared similar styling to the 250 Monza, but later that year the styling was revised using the larger, angular tank and other cycle parts used on the 250 Diana.

The American motorcycle market slumped and in 1967 Berliner were in financial trouble and refused a consignment of 3,500 machines from the factory. These machines were sold to Liverpool businessman Bill Hannah, who sold the bikes to the public between 1968 and 1972. A lot of these were Sebrings which were sold at a discounted price. By 1972, 400 machines remained unsold and these were sold to journalist and dealer Mick Walker who dismantled them for spares. Hannah offered no support or spares network for the bikes he sold which damaged Ducati's reputation in the UK.

In 1968 just over 200 Sebrings were produced using the 'wide case' engine. These had a higher compression ratio of 9.5:1.

== Technical details ==
=== Engine and transmission ===
The 350 engine was an enlarged version of the company's 250 Monza, using the same soft cam and small valve head. The single cylinder bevel drive OHC engine was of unit construction and had alloy head and alloy barrels with cast iron liners. The 250's bore was increased to 76 mm (3.0 in) and the stroke increased to 75 mm (3.0 in) giving a displacement of 340 cc (21 cu in). A Borgo 3 ring piston was fitted which gave a compression ratio of 8.5:1. Claimed power output was 20 bhp (15 kW) @ 6,250 rpm, giving the machine a top speed of 125 km/h (78 mph). Starting was by a kickstarter on the left side of the bike and a decompression lever fitted to aid kicking the engine over.

Fuel was delivered by a remote-float 24 mm Dell'Orto carburettor. The engine used wet sump lubrication.

Primary drive was by helical gears to a multi-plate wet clutch. The Sebring had a higher primary drive ratio than the 250s. The 5 speed gearbox that had been introduced on other models in '65 was used. Chain drive took power to the rear wheel.

=== Cycle parts ===
The single cradle frame was the same as the item used on the 250 and used the engine as a stressed member. Rear suspension was by swinging arm with twin 3-way adjustable Marzocchi shock absorbers. At the front 30 mm (1.2 in) telescopic forks were fitted. Brakes were drums, the front being 180 mm (7.1 in) diameter front and 160 mm (6.3 in) rear, which were noted for having good stopping power. 18 inch wire wheels were fitted with a 275x18 tyre front and 300x18 rear.
