= Ducati 160 Monza Junior =

1960s Italian lightweight motorcycle

- Manufacturer: Ducati
- Production: 1964-1970
- Class: Standard
- Engine: Air-cooled bevel drive SOHC single cylinder four stroke
- Bore / stroke: 61 mm × 52 mm (2.4 in × 2.0 in)
- Compression ratio: 8.2:1
- Top speed: 63 mph (101 km/h)
- Power: 13 bhp (9.7 kW) @ 8,000 rpm
- Transmission: Multiplate wet clutch, 4 speed
- Frame type: Single cradle
- Suspension: Front: telescopic forks Rear: swinging arm
- Brakes: Drum front & rear
- Tyres: Front: 275x16 Rear: 325x16
- Wheelbase: 1,330 mm (52 in)
- Dimensions: L: 1,980 mm (78 in); H: 930 mm (37 in)
- Seat height: 760 mm (30 in)
- Weight: 106 kg (234 lb) (dry)

The Ducati 160 Monza Junior is a 152 cc (9.3 cu in) single cylinder bevel drive SOHC motorcycle produced by the Italian manufacturer Ducati from 1964 to 1970. The model was the most successful of the Ducati OHC singles. The exact number produced is not known, but estimates put the figure between 13,000 and 15,000. This exceeds the total number of all other Ducati singles produced from 1967 to 1975.

== History ==
in 1955, Ducati engineer Fabio Taglioni designed a 98 cc SOHC single on which the range of Ducati singles was based. The 98 was soon enlarged to a 125. The American importers, Berliner Motor Corporation, felt a larger version of the machine would sell better in the American market. The announcement of Honda's soon to be introduced CB160 may also have been a factor. The factory responded by increasing the 125's bore from 55.2 mm (2.17 in) to 61 mm (2.4 in) whilst keeping the same 52 mm (2.0 in) stroke, giving a displacement of 152 cc (9.3 cu in). The 125's frame and cycle parts were retained and the machine was styled in a similar way to the 250 cc Monza. The machine was launched in 1964 as the 160 Monza Junior. Initial versions had a 3 speed gearbox but this was soon changed to a 4 speed unit.

A variant of the 160 with a more angular tank and mudguards was introduced in 1965, and the next year a more angular front headlight was added with a new seat. The styling then remained virtually unchanged until production ceased in 1970.

Most of Ducati's production was sent to the US, however in 1967 Berliner were in financial trouble and refused a consignment of 3,500 machines from the factory. These machines were sold to Liverpool businessman Bill Hannah, who sold the bikes to the public between 1968 and 1972. 1,500 of these were Monza Juniors, which were sold at 25% less than the same machines being sold by Ducati's UK importer Vic Camp. Hannah offered no support or spares network for the bikes he sold which damaged Ducati's reputation in the UK. The machines were under-geared which led to main bearing failures or dropped valves on some machines.

== Technical details ==
=== Engine and transmission ===
The 160 engine was an enlarged version of the company's 125. The single cylinder bevel drive OHC engine was of unit construction and had alloy head and alloy barrels with cast iron liners. The 125's bore was increased 5.8 mm to 61 mm (2.4 in) whilst the stroke remained at 52 mm (2.0 in) giving a displacement of 152 cc (9.3 cu in). Main bearings were ball bearings with roller bearings for the big end. A Borgo 4 ring piston was fitted which gave a compression ratio of 8.2:1. Claimed power output was 13 bhp (9.7 kW) @ 8,000 rpm, giving the machine a top speed of 63 mph (101 km/h).

Fuel was delivered by a remote-float 22 mm Dell'Orto carburettor. The engine used wet sump lubrication.

Primary drive was by helical gears to a multi-plate wet clutch. Initially a 3 speed gearbox was fitted but this was soon changed to a 4 speed unit. Chain drive took power to the rear wheel.

=== Cycle parts ===
The single cradle frame was the same as the item used on the 125 and used the engine as a stressed member. Rear suspension was by swinging arm with twin shock absorbers. At the front 30 mm (1.2 in) Marzocchi telescopic forks were fitted. Brakes were drums, the front being 158 mm (6.2 in) diameter front and 136 mm (5.4 in) rear. 16 inch wire wheels were fitted with a 275x16 tyre front and 325x16 rear.
