= Ducati Mach 1 =

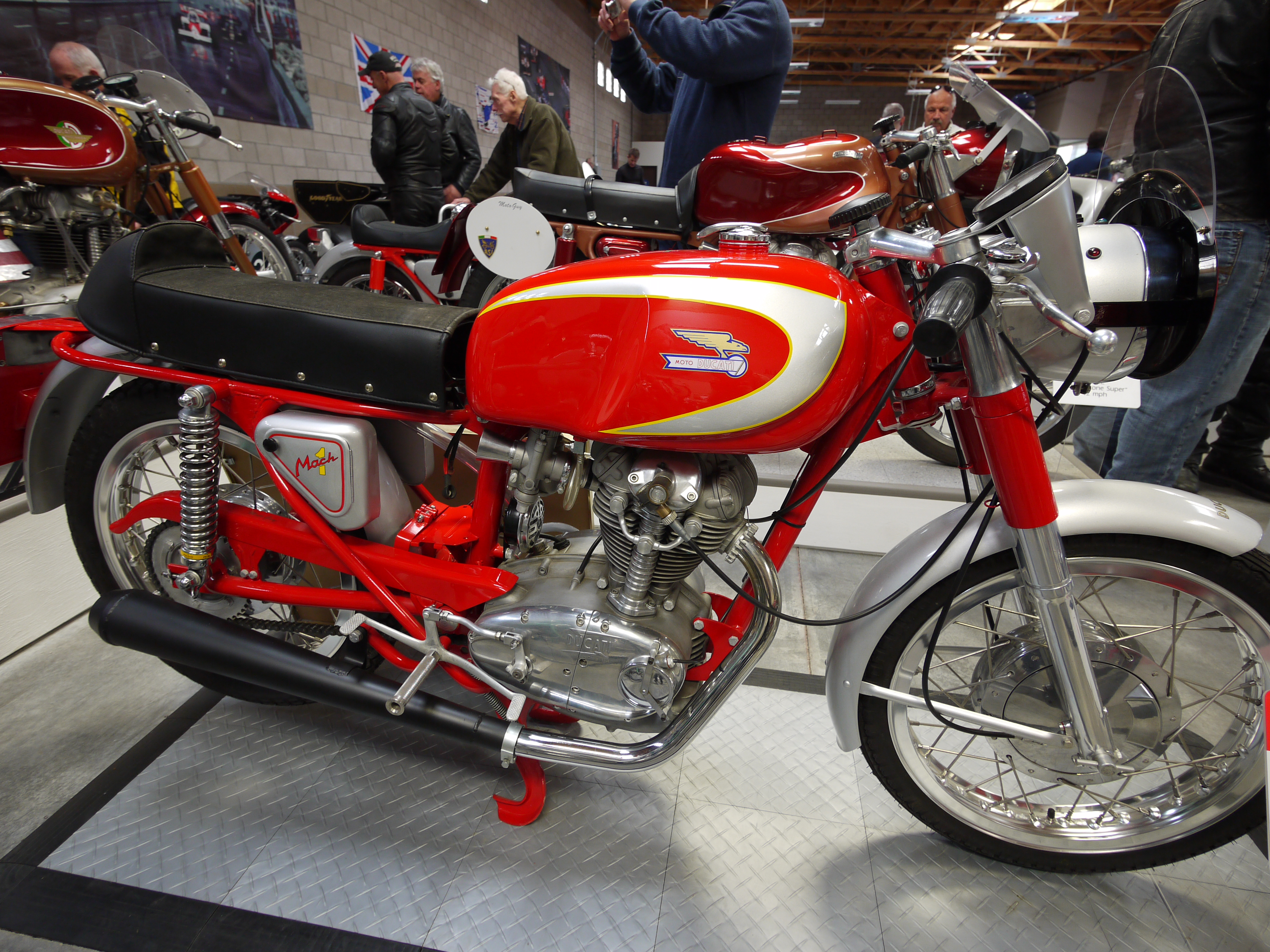
- 1964 250 Mach 1
- Manufacturer: Ducati Meccanica
- Production: 1964–1966; Production by year: 1964: 296; 66 (USA); 1965: 308; 30 (USA); 1966: 98; 40 (USA)
- Predecessor: Ducati Diana
- Successor: Ducati 250 Mark 3
- Class: Standard
- Engine: 248.6 cc (15.17 cu in) 4-stroke air-cooled bevel drive SOHC single-cylinder, contact breaker battery ignition with a single Dell'Orto SSI29D carburetor.
- Bore / stroke: 74 mm × 57.8 mm (2.91 in × 2.28 in)
- Compression ratio: 10:1
- Power: 27.6 hp (20.6 kW) @ 8500 rpm
- Transmission: 5 speed, wet clutch type.
- Frame type: Single, open cradle frame in tubular steel
- Suspension: Front: Telescopic forks, Rear: Swinging arm rear suspension with twin, Marzocchi's 3-way adjustable shocks.
- Brakes: Front: 180 mm (7.1 in) drum type, Rear: 160 mm (6.3 in) drum type
- Tires: Front: 2.50 x 18”; Rear: 2.75 x 18”
- Wheelbase: 1350 mm (53.15")
- Dimensions: L: 2000 mm (78.75"); W: 590 mm (23.25")
- Seat height: 760 mm (29.9")
- Weight: 116 kg (255.2 lbs) (dry)

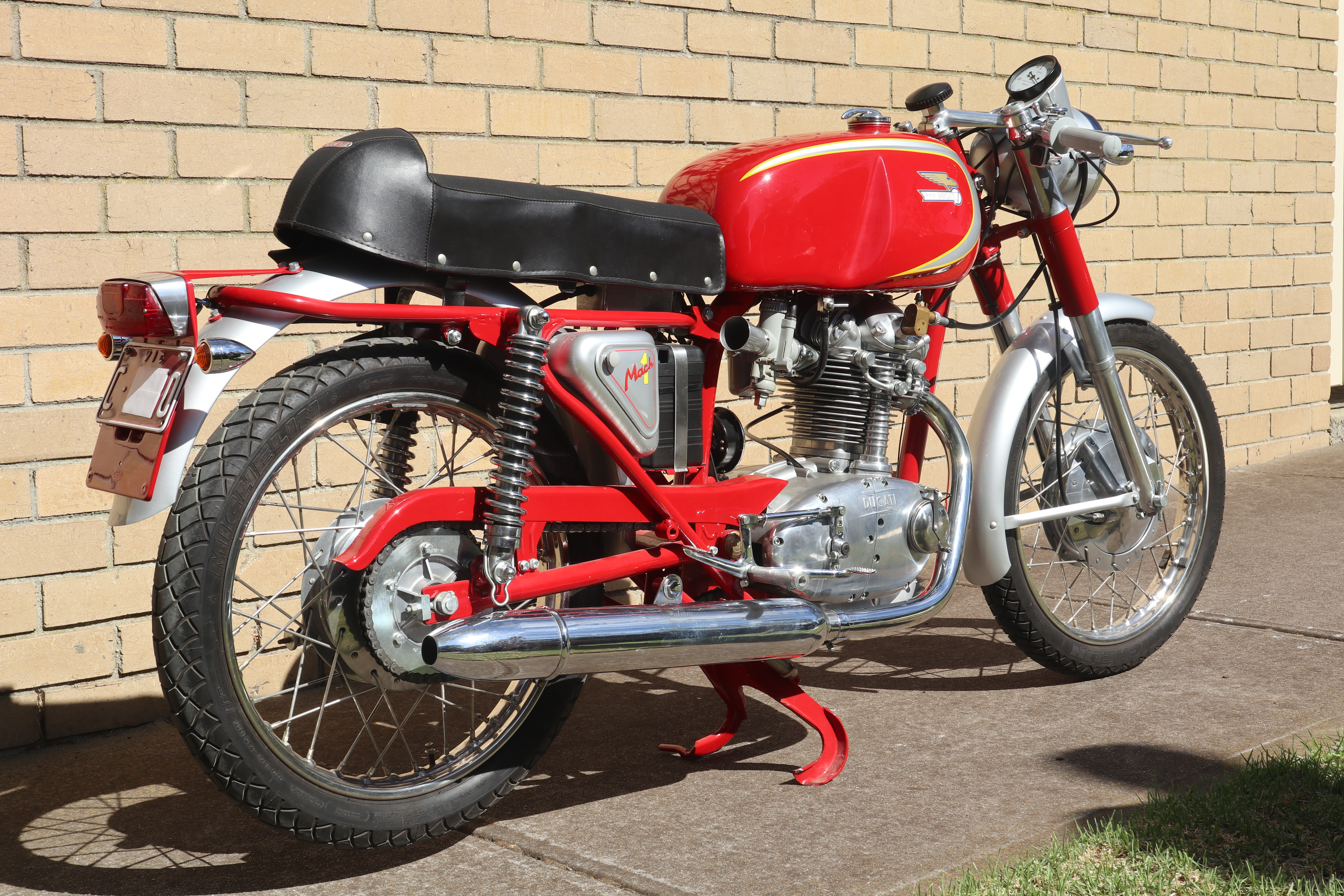
Rear view

The Ducati Mach 1 is a 250 cc single-cylinder engine motorcycle produced by Italian manufacturer Ducati from 1964 to 1966. It was the fastest 250 road bike at the time, being capable of just over 100 mph (160 km/h) in full road going trim (lights and silencer).

Many were converted for racing use, and in the hands of Alastair Michael Rogers (AKA Mike Rogers) it gave Ducati a TT win when he won the 250 cc production TT. The regulations for the production TT were strict, and Mike Rogers averaged 134.84 km/h on his almost production condition Mach 1 with a fairing and painted green. Mike Rogers was blind in his left eye as a result of a childhood accident, but his efforts and the consistent performance of his Mach 1 enabled him to win. The engine number was DM250M1 00001-01950 and the DM250M1 engine was also used in some Ducati Mark 3s. A total of 838 Ducati Mach 1s were produced, but not many are still in existence as they were also used for racing.
