= Motorcycle handlebar =

Motorcycle steering mechanism component

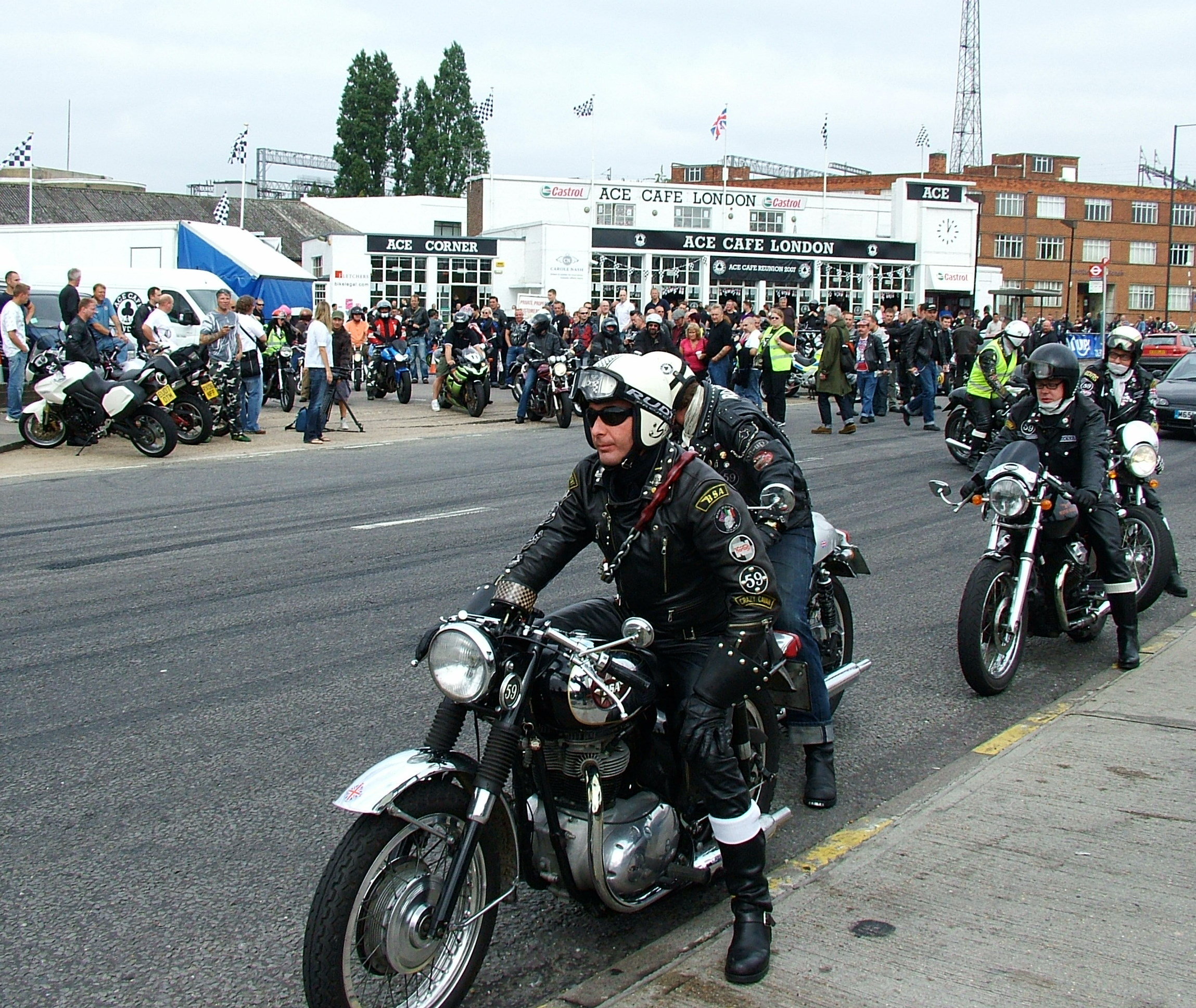
BSA with clip-on bars by the Ace Café

A motorcycle handlebar is a tubular component of a motorcycle's steering mechanism. Handlebars provide a mounting place for controls such as brake, throttle, clutch, horn, light switches and rear view mirrors; and they help to support part of the rider's weight. Even when a handlebar is a single piece it is usually referred to in the plural as handlebars.

== Construction ==
One-piece handlebar mounted on the triple clamp.

Handlebars are made from round-section metal tubing, typically aluminium alloys or chrome plated steel but also of carbon fibre and titanium, shaped to the desired contour. Holes may be drilled for the internal routing of control cables such as brake, throttle, and clutch. Risers hold the handlebars above their mounting position on the upper triple clamp or the top of the fork, and may be integrated into the bar itself or separate items. Each handlebar end may contain bar-end weights to damp vibration by isolating the bar's resonant frequency from that of the engine. Electrically heated grips may be fitted to provide warmth for the rider in cold weather.

=== Sizes ===
There are several size parameters that describe most motorcycle handlebars:

- Width from grip to grip may vary from a single tiller to 37 inches (940 mm).
- May rise above triple clamp up to 24 in (610 mm) or more, called ape hangers when very high, or may drop a few inches below, called clubman bars.
- Pullback, the distance grips are behind their mounting location, may vary from 4.25 to 17 in (108 to 432 mm).
- Diameters vary; commonly 7/8, 1, and 1 1/4 in (22, 25, and 32 mm), though oversized bars of 1 1/4, 1 1/2, and 1 3/4 in (32, 38, and 44 mm) may reduce to 1 in (25 mm) at the grips so standard controls may be mounted.

== Types of handlebars ==
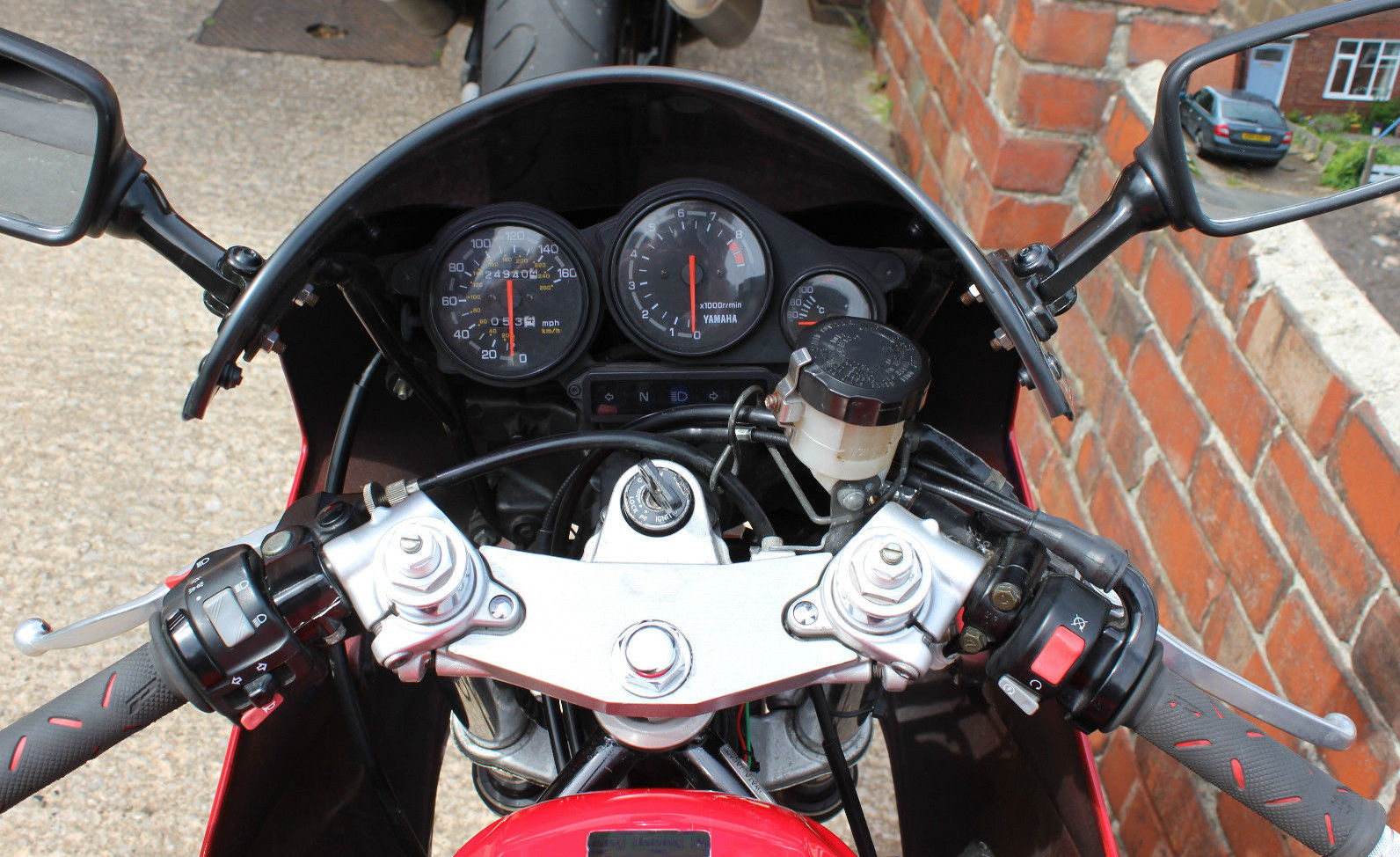
Yamaha TRX clip-on 'bars mounted above the yoke with non-adjustable angle, but fork tubes may be raised or lowered

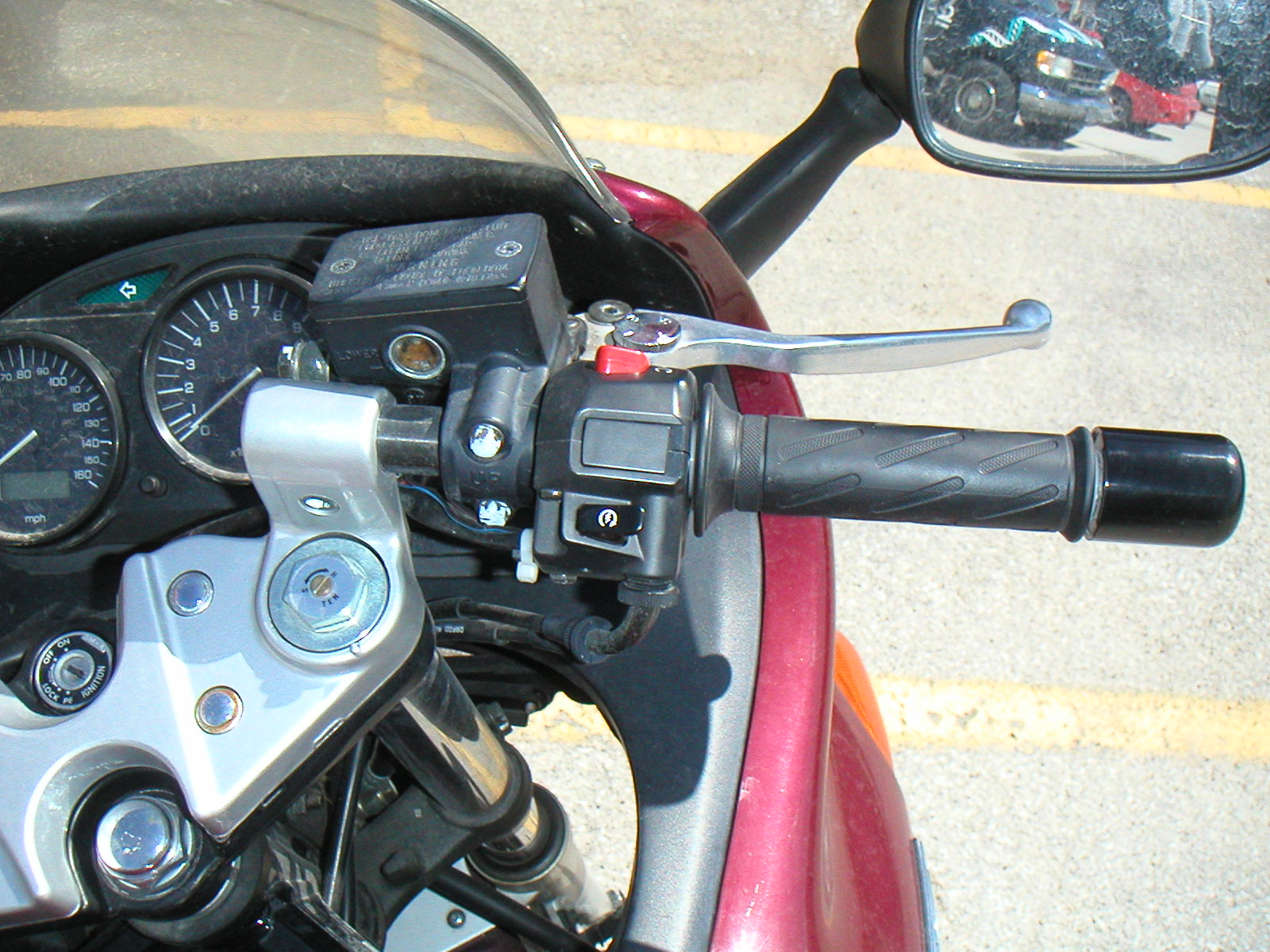
A non-adjustable handlebar riser that is integral to the upper triple clamp

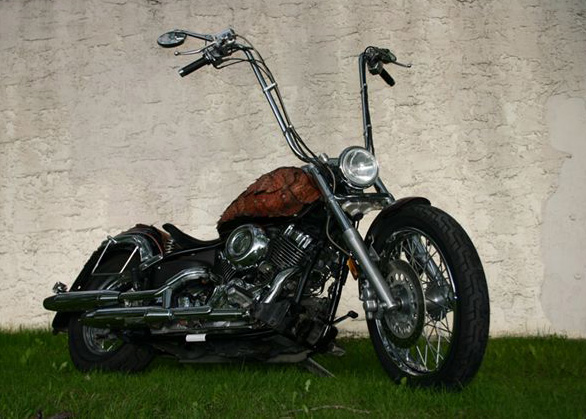
"Ape-hanger" handlebars

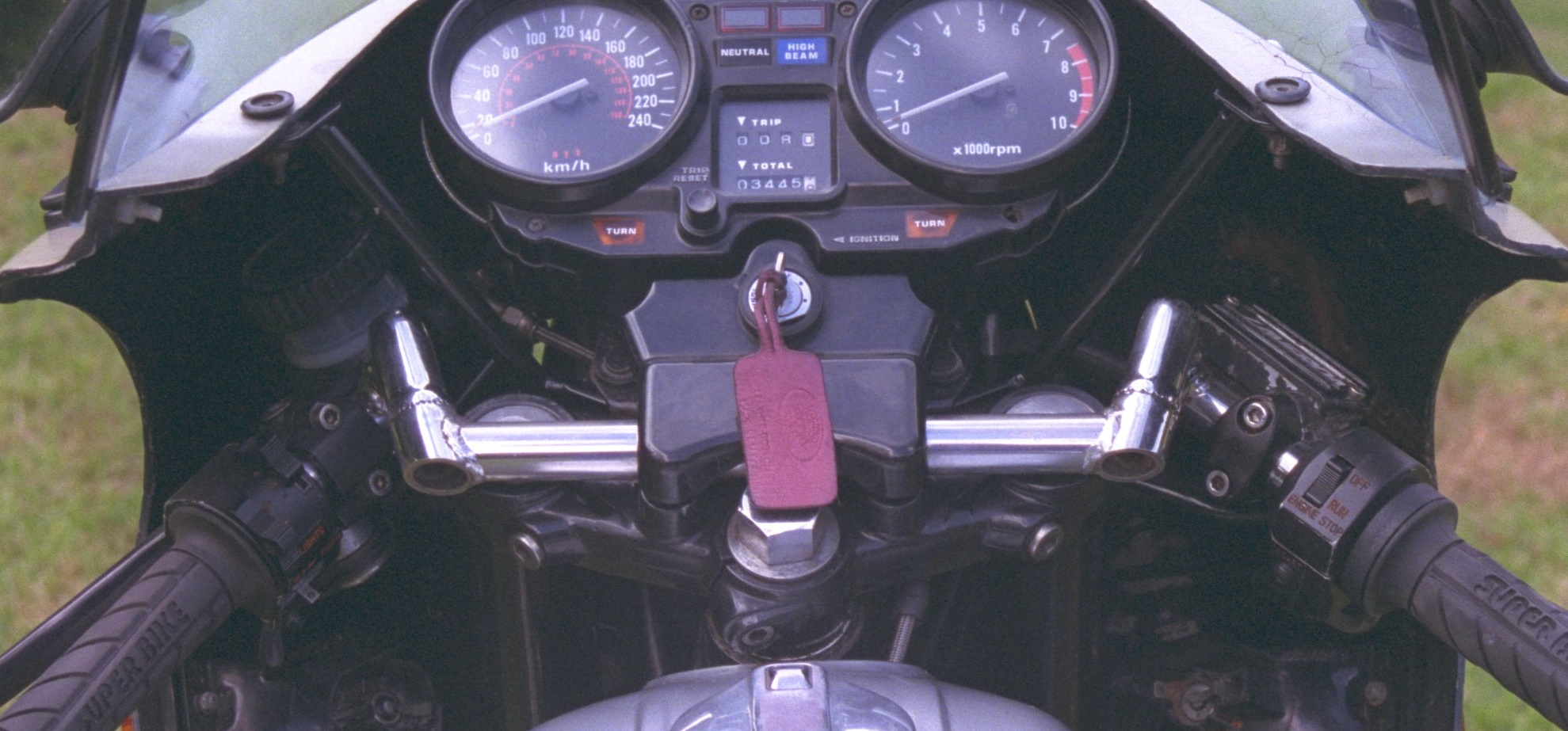
Jota bars on a Laverda motorcycle

Handlebars come in a variety of types designed for particular types of riding:

- "Ape-hangers" — found mainly on choppers, these are handlebars of such exaggerated height that the rider has to reach up to them, hence the name. Rumored to have originally been implemented to aid riders on motorcycles with no rear suspension to lift themselves from their seat to avoid potholes, they can also aid in a more comfortable ride since the riders hands are closer to shoulder height. However, if the position of the hands is higher than the shoulders, they may cause numbness in the hands, but the use of throttle locks or cruise controls may help alleviate such symptoms. Some jurisdictions restrict the maximum height of ape-hangers for safety reasons.
- Beach bars — similar to cruiser bars, slope back toward the rider to allow a relaxed riding position. Tend to be very wide, and offer the rider a relaxed position.
- Buckhorn handlebars — similar to ape-hangers, but shorter and curved (thereby resembling a buck's horn). They are sometimes called "mini-apes" (miniature ape-hangers), but are not. Buckhorns have a different hand positioning than mini apes. The bar ends on Buckhorns are angled in and down towards the rider, mini apes hand positioning is out and more horizontal. A good example of buckhorn handlebars are the ones on Ghost Rider's Hellbike, from the 2007 movie Ghost Rider.
- Clip-ons — popular on sport bikes, in which two separate short handles are clamped directly to the fork tubes. Adjustable or non-adjustable, these may be fitted above or below the triple tree. These two piece clip-on bars may also be attached to the top triple tree clamp and be non-adjustable.
- Clubman bars — a one-piece handlebar mounted on the triple tree, reaching forward with ends slightly angled backwards to give the rider a lower, more crouching riding position. Common on café racers in the UK, Clubman bars are sometime known as "Thruxton bars" or "Thruxton drops" (after the Thruxton race circuit); or "Ace bars" (after the Ace Cafe on the North Circular Road in London).
- Cruiser handlebars — long and slope towards the rear of the motorcycle so that the rider can sit upright.
- Drag bars — nearly straight across to create a forward-leaning and aerodynamic riding position.
- Jota bars - a five-piece multi-adjustable bar with a straight centre piece, and right-angle knuckle joints between the centre bar and handlebar grips, as seen on most Laverda Jotas and other 70s/80s motorbikes. The right angle is designed to point downwards for aerodynamic advantage, but older riders rotate them upwards for comfort.
- Motocross bars — motocross, off-road, and dual-sport motorcycles normally have tubular bars with a cross-brace to resist torsional twist.
- Rabbit Ears - feature straight riser sections which bend sharply back and down toward the rider, giving the appearance of the ears of a rabbit. Popular on choppers.
- T-bar - similar to drag bars, but have built in risers which create the look of a 'T'. This modifies the riding position from the forward leaning drag bar to a more relaxed riding position.
- Z-bar — containing no bends, all miter cut and welded tubing to create a sharply angled handlebar. The vertical riser sections can vary in height, creating a short or tall Z bar.

== See also ==
- Bicycle handlebar
- Motorcycle fork
