= Dell'Orto =

Italian company

- Industry: Automotive industry
- Founded: 1933; 93 years ago in Seregno, Italy
- Headquarters: Cabiate, Italy
- Number of locations: Italy, India, China
- Area served: Worldwide
- Key people: Giuseppe Dell'Orto, President Andrea Dell'Orto, Executive Vice President, Chairman of Dellorto India Private Ltd Luca Dell'Orto, Operations Manager
- Number of employees: 900+
- Website: www.dellorto.it

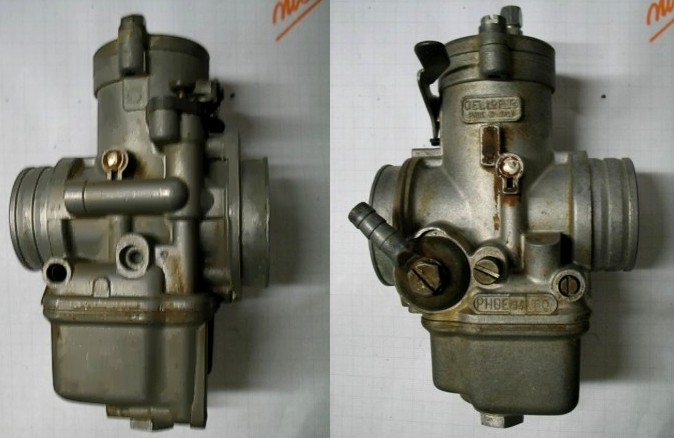
Dell'orto PHBE 34 RD carburetor.

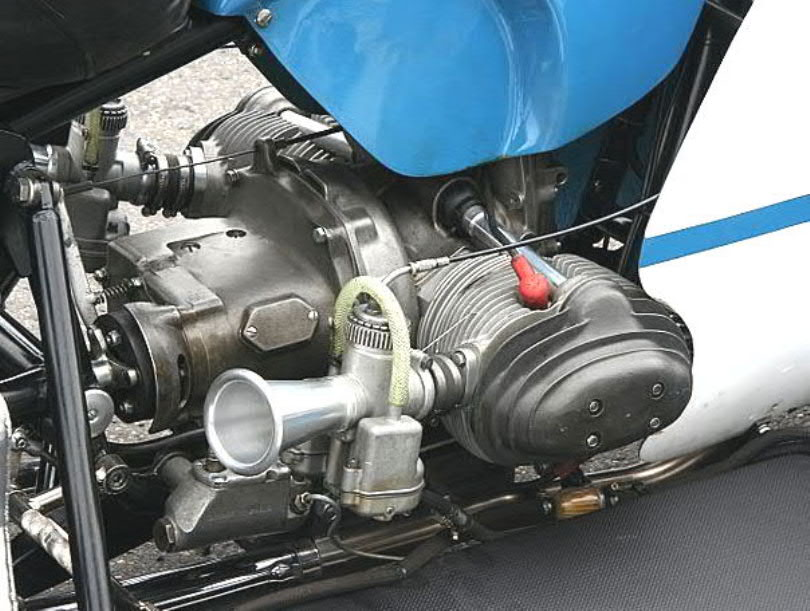
Dell'Orto carburettors, as used on BMW Rennsport 500cc sidecar outfit engines during the 1950s and 1960s

Dell'Orto is an Italian company, headquartered in Cabiate, specialized in the construction of carburetors and electronic injection systems. The company was founded in 1933 as "Società anonima Gaetano Dell'Orto e figli" (Gaetano Dell’Orto and Sons) but actually only founded by Gaetano's sons, Luigi Piero and Giuseppe. The first production was carburetors for motorbikes. Right before World War II the company started producing carburetors with aluminum body, for competitive racing. Under the second Dell'Orto generation, towards the end of the 60s, the company began producing OEM carburetors for the Fiat group, as well as other Italian and foreign manufacturers (i.e. Flandria, Belgium).

At the end of the 1980s, under the supervision of Luigi Dell'Orto (son of Gaetano), the company's first injection systems were released. In 2006, the company expanded on the Indian market, opening Dell'Orto India. In September 2009, Dell’Orto India Private Limited, founded in 2006 with the cooperation of a local partner, becomes 100% Italian and fully owned by the Dell’Orto family. In 2011, Dellorto decided to establish a new technical and commercial site in China, named Dell’Orto Shanghai Trading Company. In 2018, Dellorto signed a strategic joint venture with VARROC to develop fuel injection systems for the Indian market and worldwide.

After three generations, the company is still fully owned by the Dell'Orto family, with Giuseppe Dell'Orto as President of the company and Andrea Dell'Orto as Executive Vice President and Chairman of Dellorto India Private Ltd.

Dellorto works with Grand Prix Motorcycle Racing, with Gilera, Aprilia, BMW, Kawasaki and many others. Dellorto produces mechanical throttle bodies, electronic throttle bodies, variable intake systems, compressor by-pass valves, exhaust management parts, electronic control units, carburetors, fuel systems, sensors/ actuators and after market products.

Today, the company is one of the worldwide leaders in its field and is present in the Road Racing World Championship. It is also used in every Derbi, Aprilia and Yamaha 50cc model. Dellorto masters the supply of sports engines from 4 to 12 cylinders for very large manufacturers such as BMW, Honda, Ferrari, Alfa Romeo, Fiat and Renault Sport. Dellorto also equips Diesel engines.

== See also ==
- List of Italian companies
