= Telescopic fork =

Form of motorcycle front suspension

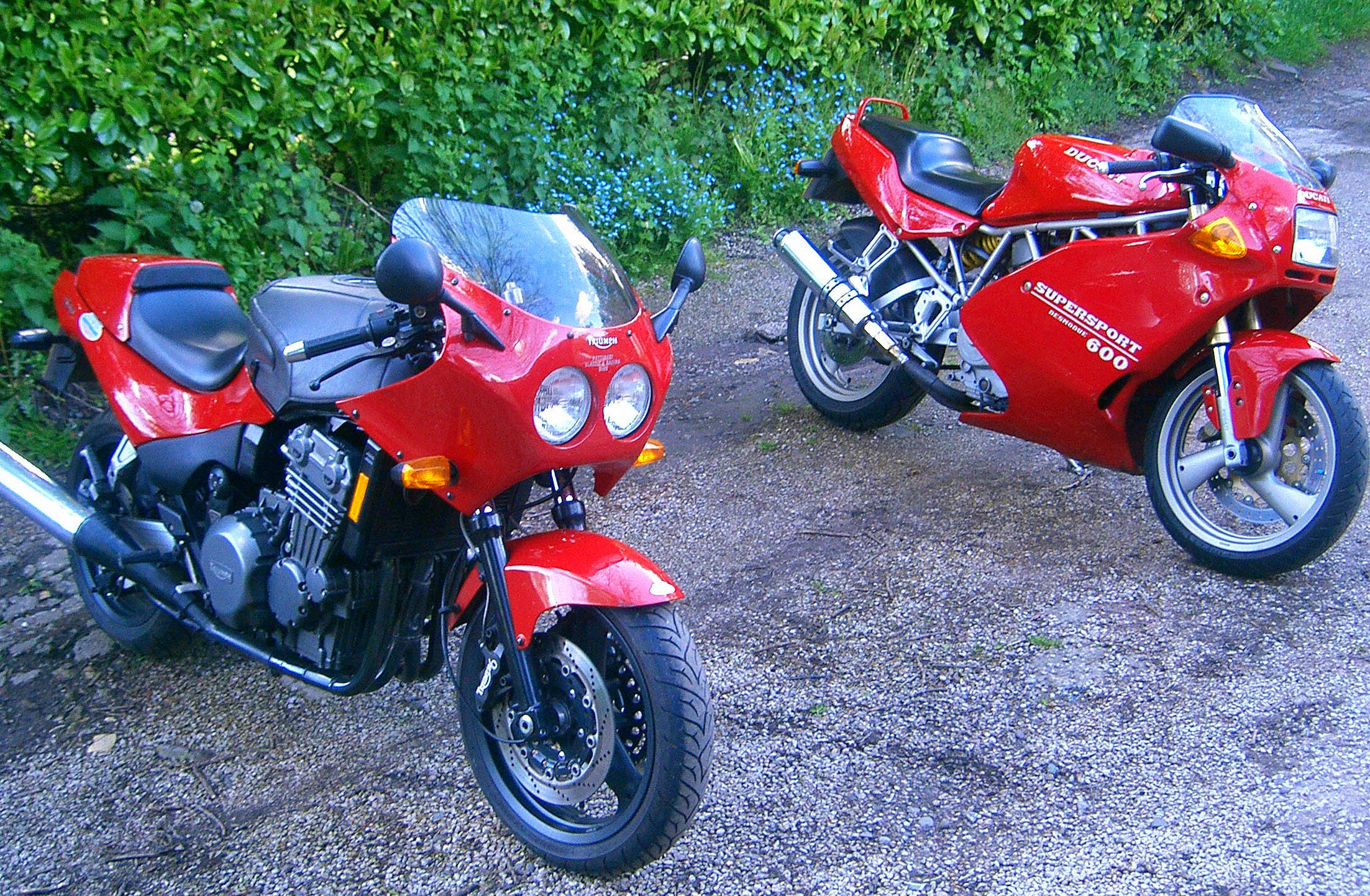
Conventional (on left) and USD forks

A telescopic fork is a form of motorcycle or bicycle front suspension whose use is so common that it is virtually universal. The telescopic fork uses fork tubes and sliders which contain the springs and dampers.

The main advantages of the telescopic fork are that it is simple in design and relatively cheap to manufacture and assemble, and that it is lighter than older designs using external components and linkage systems. Telescopic forks sometimes have gaiters to protect the fork tubes from abrasion and corrosion.

A more modern (and more expensive) version of the conventional telescopic fork is the inverted or "USD" (upside-down) fork.

BMW's patented telelever front suspension appears at first glance to be conventional telescopic fork, but the fork tubes contain neither springs nor damping. Instead, a wishbone and an inboard monoshock perform suspension duties, and the forks serve to locate the front wheel and control steering.

== History ==
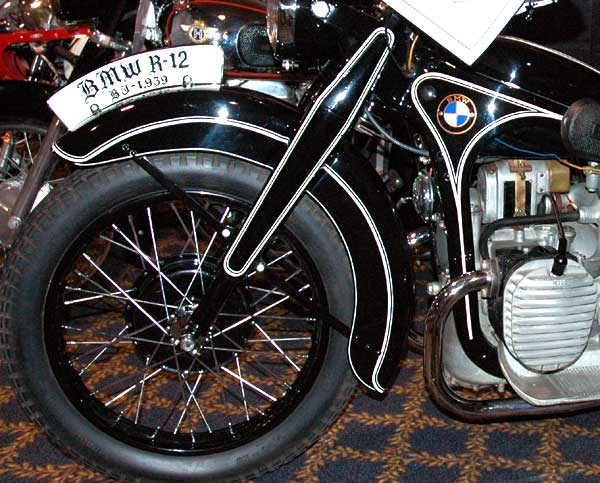
Early oil-damped telescopic fork on a 1939 BMW R12

The first production motorcycles with hydraulically damped telescopic forks were the German BMW R12 and R17 in 1935. However, undamped telescopic forks were used on bikes made by The Scott Motorcycle Company from the beginning of production in 1908, and the Danish Nimbus used them from 1934 on.

== Design ==
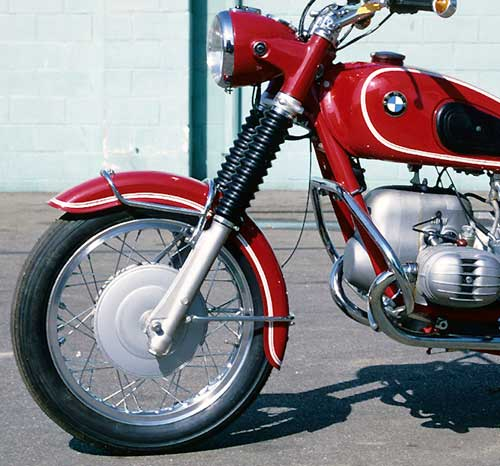
1968 BMW R60US with conventional telescopic fork

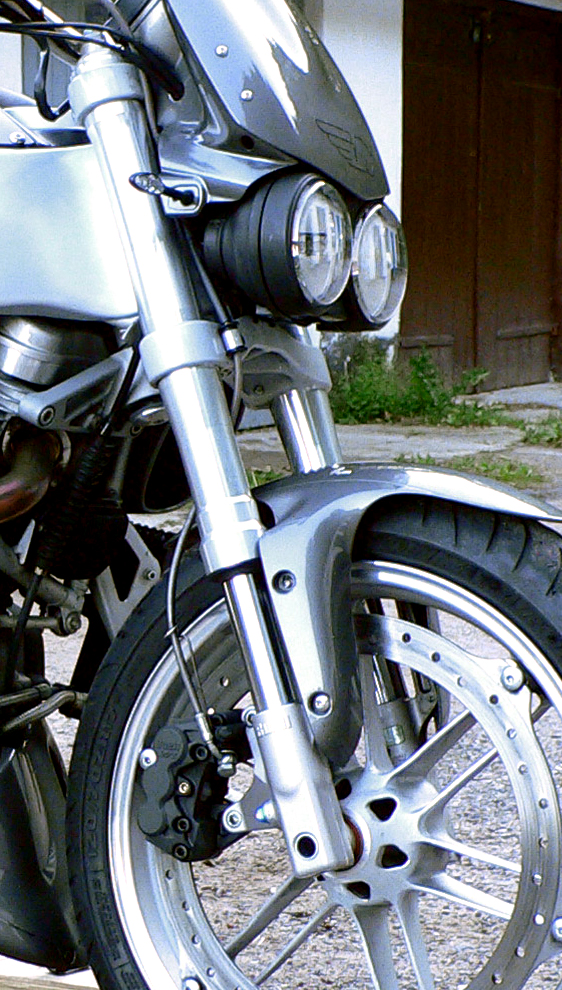
Telescopic fork in upside down design, with stanchions at the bottom.

Conventional telescopic forks invariably have a pair of fork tubes, or "stanchions", at the top, clamped to a triple tree (also called a triple clamp or a yoke), and the sliders are at the bottom, attached to the front wheel spindle.

Inside most tubes are springs, fork oil, and air, creating a shock absorber. Some forks allow pressurized air to be added through a valve in the top of the fork to stiffen the suspension. Quality forks have a flexible air tube between both fork tubes in order to balance the air pressure in both forks. Modern fork tubes have a method which employs a screw to compress fork spring to increase or decrease spring pre-load.

=== Damping ===
Cartridge forks provide regressive damping. Self-contained cartridges within the forks contain spring-covered orifices regulating fork oil flow. The springs resist low forces and thus provide high damping rates. Higher forces compress the springs, allowing more oil flow and less damping. Thus the fork is stiffer when responding to small bumps but will soften as larger ones are encountered.

Most modern forks also are suspended on springs and control fork movement by damping through adjustable valving to control movement by controlling the flow of fork oil. The larger the orifice, the more free the flow and the less damped the fork. A selector atop the fork engages the desired hole size or valve and corresponding damping rate in compression, while usually the lower tube has a mechanism to control rebound (extension) damping.

Single action damping is currently being manufactured, such that compression occurs in one fork tube while its partner tube controls the rebound damping. This is because the oil controlling the damping in each tube, then, has only to control one direction of damping and is therefore less aerated by it working in both directions, and it develops less heat while working, which causes a variation to the thickness of the oil, thereby adversely affecting the damping rate.

=== Upside down ===
On most modern motorbikes this system is inverted, with the "sliders" and the spring/damper unit at the top, clamped to the yoke, while the stanchions are at the bottom. This is done (1) to reduce unsprung weight by having the heavier components suspended, and (2) to improve the strength and rigidity of the assembly by having the strong large-diameter "sliders" clamped in the yokes. The inverted system is referred to as an upside-down fork, or "USD" for short. One disadvantage of the USD design is that the entire reservoir of damping oil is above the slider seal so in case of leak the oil drains out, rendering any damping ineffective.

=== Triple tree ===
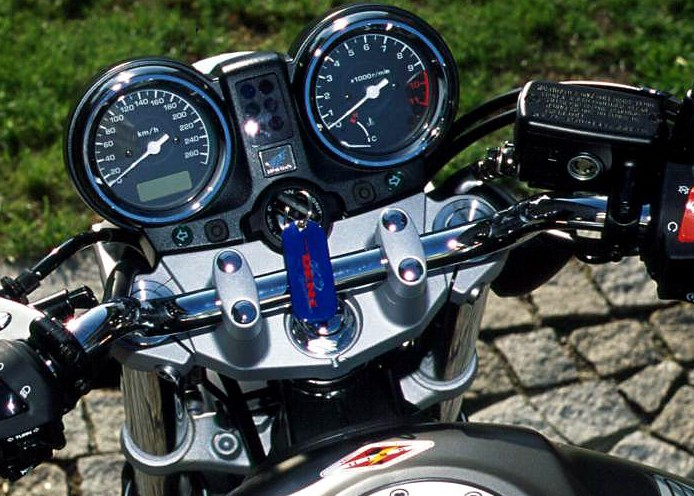
The upper triple clamp joins the top of the fork tubes and the handlebar to the frame of a Honda 919

A triple tree ("triple clamp" (US) or "yoke" (UK)) attaches the fork tubes to the frame via steering head bearings, which allow the fork assembly to pivot from side to side, and therefore steer the motorcycle. Most bikes have upper and lower triple trees, providing two solid clamping points that keep the fork tubes parallel while also connecting the forks to the frame via the steering head bearings.

With the tendency to employ fork tubes with single action damping, fork triple trees need to be reinforced more than when the forks shared both damping roles, because the rigidity of the triple trees is relied upon to distribute the forces within the forks without flex.

The BMW Telever fork has only a single triple tree, which allows its fork sliders to be longer than those on telescopic forks. This in turn allows for greater overlap of the sliders over the stanchion tubes, which improves stiffness and helps to reduce flex.
