= List of Laverda Motorcycles =

This is a list of motorcycles manufactured by Italian manufacturer Laverda.

== 1950-1987 ==
During this period Laverda was under the control of the Laverda family.

Engine Size	Model	Production	Notes	Image
50 cc	Laverdino	1959-	50 cc 4 stroke moped.	
50 cc	49 Mini	1960-	49 cc 4 stroke scooter fitted with 2 speed gearbox and single seat. 3 speeds and dualseat fitted from 1962.	
50 cc	LZ 50 Pippo	1981-1983	Zündapp engined 2 stroke.	
50 cc	LZ 50 Sport	1981-1983	Sports version of the Pippo with nose fairing.	
50 cc	OR 50 Atlas	1985-1990	Cagiva/Minarelli engined 2 stroke enduro.	
60 cc	60 Mini	1962-	Enlarged version of the 49 Mini.	
75 cc	Motoleggera 75	1949-1960	Introduced in 1949 with a 75 cc ohv engine, 3 speed gearbox, pressed steel frame and cantilever leaf-spring rear suspension. In 1950 a pressed steel spine frame was fitted and 1952 the model gained a tubular frame, swinging arm rear suspension and a 4 speed gearbox.	
75 cc	Milan Taranto 75	1952-1960	Tuned version of the Motoleggera following success in the Giro d’Italia.	
100 cc	Tip Sport 100	1953-1960	Enlarged engine capacity version of the Milan Taranto 75.	
100 cc	Tip Tourismo 100	1953-1960	Touring version of the Tip Sport 100.	
125 cc	125 Sport	1965-	Ohv single with near horizontally inclined cylinder.	
125 cc	125 Trail	1965-	Off-Road version of the 125 Sport.	
125 cc	125CR	1975-1976	Off-road bike with air cooled Husqvarna 2 stroke engine	
125 cc	LH 125	1976-1979	Off-road bike evolved from the 125CR. 3 generations of the model produced: LH1 - LH3	
125 cc	LZ 125	1977-1983	Road bike powered by Zündapp water cooled 2 stroke engine.	
125 cc	LZ 125 Sport	1980-1983	Sports version of LZ 125 with nose fairing.	
125 cc	LZ 125 Elegant	1981-1983	Custom version of the LZ 125 finished in black and gold.	
125 cc	LZ 125 Elegant	1981-1983	Chopper styled version of the LZ 125.	
125 cc	LB 125 Sport	1983-1985	Following the demise of Zündapp, Laverda started to produce its own engines based on the Zündapp design.	
125 cc	LB 125 Uno	1984-1986	Updated version of the sport with square-section frame, 16" front wheel and oil injection.	
125 cc	LB 125 Lesmo	1986-1989	Replacement of the Uno with full fairing and increased power.	
125 cc	LB 125 Sabbia	1986-1987	Touring version with rack and saddlebags.	
175 cc	LZ 175	1977-1983	Road bike powered by Zündapp water cooled 2 stroke engine.	
200 cc	200 Bicilindrico	1962-1976	200cc 4 stroke twin	
250 cc	250 Chott	1974-1976	2 stroke off-road model.	
250 cc	250 2T/R	1976-1977	Revamp of the Chott with more power and a stronger frame.	
250 cc	250 Enduro	1977-1979	Replacement for the 2T/R using a Husqvarna 2 stroke engine.	
350 cc	350	1978-1981	DOHC twin derived from the 500T. Introduced after Italy raised sales tax on motorcycles over 350 cc.	
350 cc	GS Lesmo 350	1986	350 water cooled v-3 2 stroke prototype that was never put into production.	
500 cc	500T	1977-1978	Air cooled DOHC 4 stroke parallel twin. Known as Alpino in the UK and Zeta in the US.	
500 cc	500S	1978-1983	Updated and restyled version of the 500T with engine balance shaft. Known as Alpino S in the UK.	
500 cc	Formula 500	1978-1980	Track racing version of the 500S.	
500 cc	Montjuic	1979-1984	UK only high performance version of the 500S.	
500 cc	500SFC	1981	Germany only cafe racer version of the 500S.	
600 cc	OR600 Atlas	1986-1989	On/off-road machine using a 571 cc DOHC twin derived from the 500T.	
600 cc	CR600 Cruiser	1986-1989	Roadster using the same engine as the OR600 Atlas.	
650 cc	650 GT	1968	650 cc SOHC twin	
668 cc	CR668 Cruiser	1986	Prototype using a development of the 600 cc twin with oil cooling, Weber-Marelli fuel injection and enlarged to 668 cc.	
750 cc	750 GT	1968-1974	750 cc SOHC twin	
750 cc	750 S	1969-1970	Sporting version of the 750GT	
750 cc	750 SF	1970-1973	Developed from the 750S	
750 cc	SF1	1973	Updated SF	
750 cc	SF2	1974-1975	Updated SF1	
750 cc	SF3	1976	Updated SF2	
750 cc	SFC	1971-1976	Hand-built production racer developed from the SF	
750 cc	750 GTL	1974-1977	Updated version of the 750GT	
1000 cc	1000	1973-1974	981 cc DOHC triple	
1000 cc	3C	1974-1975	Updated version of the 1000 with disc brakes	
1000 cc	3CL	1975-1981	Updated version of the 3C with cast wheels. US version had left hand gear changed and designated Jarama.	
1000 cc	Jota	1976-1982	High performance version of the 1000 cc triple	
1000 cc	1000 V6	1977	V6 endurance racer. A single machine was built which raced in the 1978 Bol d'Or. The following year endurance racers were limited to four cylinders so the project was terminated. A second machine was built from spares in 1991 ahead of a planned production of 25 road bikes which was subsequently cancelled.	
1000 cc	Jota 120	1982-1984	120° crankshaft development of the Jota	
1000 cc	RGS	1982-1985	Development of the 1000 cc triple with 120° crankshaft	
1000 cc	RGS Executive	1982-1983	Upmarket version of the RGA	
1000 cc	RGS Corsa	1984-1986	High performance version of the RGS	
1000 cc	RGA	1984-1985	Cut down version of the RGS	
1000 cc	RGA Jota	1984-1985	Sports styled version of the RGA	
1000 cc	RGA Jota Special	1984-1985	High performance version of the RGA produced by the UK importers, Three Cross Motorcycles, the model had an RGS Corsa specification engine	
1000 cc	1000SFC	1985-1988	High performance replacement of the RGS	
1200 cc	1200T	1977-1979	1,116 cc triple developed from the 981 cc 3CL.	
1200 cc	Jota America	1977-1979	US version of the 1200T complying with noise and emission regulations and with left hand gearchange.	
1200 cc	Mirage	1978-1982	UK high performance version of the 1200T.	
1200 cc	Formula Mirage	1981	Limited production version of the Mirage with higher performance.	
1200 cc	30th Anniversary 1200	1979	Limited edition to celebrate Laverda's 30th anniversary. Finished in gold and black.	
1200 cc	1200TS	1979-1982	Gran Turismo replacement of the 1200T and Jota America.	
1200 cc	1200TS Mirage	1979-1982	Higher performance version of the 1200TS.	

=== American Eagle models ===
From 1968 to 1970 Laverdas were imported to the US by John McCormack under the American Eagle brand.

Engine Size	Model	Production	Notes	Image
150 cc	150 Renegade	1968-1970	Based on the European 125 Trail with enlarged engine and bodywork by UNICON.	
750 cc	750 Classic	1968	Based on the European 750GT with buckhorn handlebars, restyled seat and tank, crash bars and luggage rack.	
750 cc	750 Road Sport	1969-1970	Updated version of the 750 Classic.	
750 cc	750 Super Sport	1969-1970	Higher performance version of the Road Sport with higher compression ratio and sportier camshaft.	

== 1987-1990 ==
Laverda was run as a government backed worker's cooperative. The company name was changed to Nuova Moto Laverda in 1989.

Engine Size	Model	Production	Notes	Image
125 cc	125 Toledo	1989	Chopper styled water cooled 2 stroke.	
125 cc	125 GSR	1989	Prototype replacement for the 125 Lesmo that never reached production.	
125 cc	125 GP racer	1990	Disc-valve 2 stroke single racer. Its only appearance was at the 1990 Mugello GP.	
668 cc	700 El-Cid	1989	Enduro prototype using the 668 cc engine first shown in the CR 668 Cruiser prototype.	
668 cc	700 Hidalgo	1989	Cruiser prototype using the 668 cc engine.	
668 cc	650 Sport	1989	Fully faired sports bike prototype using the 668 cc engine and an aluminium twin-spar frame designed by Nico Bakker.	

== 1990-1993 ==
Laverda was taken in 1990 over by Gruppo Zanini, who formed a partnership with the Japanese Shinken corporation. Zanini were in financial trouble by 1983 and the Italian government intervened.

Engine Size	Model	Production	Notes	Image
125 cc	125 Navarro	1990-1992	Sports bike with the same engine as the Cagiva Freccia.	
668 cc	650 Sport	1992-1994	Fully faired sports bike using the Bakker chassis and an updated version of the 668 cc engine.	

== 1993-2000 ==
Laverda was taken over by a group of investors headed by Francesco Tognon and the company was renamed I.Mo.La. SpA (International Moto Laverda). Production was moved from Breganze to Zanè, 6 miles to the west.

Engine Size	Model	Production	Notes	Image
668 cc	650 Kevlar	1994	Limited edition model based on the 650 Sport with Kevlar fairing.	
668 cc	650 Iniezione Elettronica (I.E.) Sport	1995-1996	650 Sport with new engine casings.	
668 cc	650 Sport Formula	1995-1993	Updated 650 Sport with hotter camshafts, better brakes and carbon fibre parts.	
668 cc	650 Ghost	1995-1996	Naked bike with steel trellis frame.	
668 cc	650 Ghost Legend	1995-1996	Cosmetic upgrade of the Ghost with carbon fibre accessories and orange frame.	
668 cc	650 Ghost Strike	1995-1996	650 Ghost with the Bakker aluminium spar frame and a bikini fairing.	
668 cc	668 Sport	1996-2000	Cosmetic upgrade of the 650 Sport.	
668 cc	668 Ghost	1996-1998	Updated 650 Ghost.	
668 cc	668 Diamante	1997-1998	Updated version of the Ghost with half fairing. US models used the Bakker frame, other market were fitted with the steel frame.	
668 cc	Black Strike 668 Café Racer	1998	Limited edition of the Ghost Strike finished in black and without a fairing.	
750 cc	750S	1997-2000	Updated version of the 668 Sport with a new water cooled engine evolved from the 668. Using the Bakker frame, the model was initial fitted with the half fairing of the Diamante, a full fairing was fitted from 1998.	
750 cc	750 Diamante	1998-	Steel frame with half fairing.	
750 cc	750 Ghost Strike	1998-	Bakker frame with bikini fairing.	
750 cc	750S Caraneta	1998-	Bakker frame with full fairing.	
750 cc	750 Sport Formula	1998-1999	Higher performance version of the 750S.	
750 cc	750 Sport Formula II	1999-	Updated version of the 750 Sport Formula.	
750 cc	PRC 750 Cup	1999	Prototype production racer which was a stripped-down version of the 750S.	
750 cc	750 Super Sport	2000-2001	Updated version of the 750S fitted with the Sport Formula engine.	
750 cc	750 Black Strike	2000-2001	Updated version of the 668 Black Strike fitted with the 750 Sport Formula engine.	
790 cc	TTS800	1998	Enduro prototype with an enlarged 790 cc engine.	
1000 cc	1000 Super Sport	1999	Prototype 1000 cc 12 valve triple. The engine design was later used as the basis for the engine in the 900 cc Benelli Tornado Tre.	

== 2000-2004 ==
Aprilia purchased Laverda in 2000. Whilst there was some production of Laverda motorcycles, the brand was mainly used on brought in scoters and quads. Aprilia was purchased in 2004 by Piaggio who dropped the brand.

Engine Size	Model	Production	Notes	Image
650 cc	650 Lynx	2000	Prototype using a Suzuki SV650 engine.	
1000 cc	SFC 1000	2002	Prototype using an Aprilia RSV Mille derived engine.	
