= Laverda SFC =

Laverda SFC may refer to:

- Laverda 500SFC, 500cc twin motorcycle
- Laverda 750SFC, 750cc twin motorcycle
- Laverda 1000SFC, 1000cc 3 cylinder motorcycle
