= Laverda 750SFC =

Italian 750 cc parallel twin motorcycle

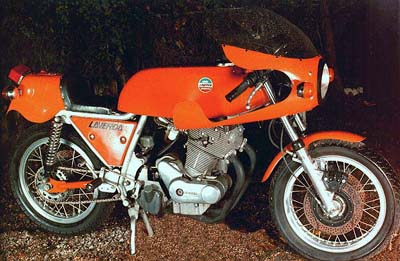
- Laverda 750SFC
- Manufacturer: Laverda
- Production: 1971-1976
- Assembly: Breganze, Italy
- Predecessor: Laverda 750SF
- Class: Production racing
- Engine: 744 cc (45.4 cu in) Air cooled SOHC 4 stroke parallel twin
- Bore / stroke: 80 mm × 74 mm (3.1 in × 2.9 in)
- Power: 70–75 bhp (52–56 kW)
- Transmission: Wet clutch, 5 speed, chain drive
- Frame type: Spine
- Suspension: Front: telescopic forks Rear: swinging arm, twin shocks
- Wheelbase: 1,480 mm (58 in)
- Weight: 206 kg (454 lb) (dry)

The Laverda 750SFC (Super Freni Competizione) is a hand-built 744 cc (45.4 cu in) air cooled SOHC 4 stroke parallel twin production racing motorcycle produced by the Italian manufacturer Laverda from 1971 to 1976. It was developed from the company's 750SF and drew from the racers used at the 1970 Bol d'Or. Finished in orange with a distinctive half-fairing, the machine was made in batches, with each batch identified by the frame number range. In total 549 SFCs were manufactured.

== History ==
Laverda 750 SFC Production Data
Batch	Frame numbers	No produced	Year
-	5000	23	1971
1st Batch	8000	78	1971
2nd Batch	11000	58	1972–3
3rd Batch	16000	122	1974
3rd Batch	17000	100	1974
4th Batch	18000	168	1975–6

Introduced in May 1971, the first 23 SFCs were manufactured for use by the factory's racing team and had frame numbers in the 5,000 range. The engines were modified with higher compression, larger valves, gas-flowed, and a new camshaft. A higher flow oil pump and improved bearings were used to improve reliability. Twin 36 mm (1.4 in) Amal carburettors were fitted. The chassis was strengthened by using larger diameter tubes and suspension altered. An aluminium tank was fitted and fibreglass fairing and seat tail. They dominated the 1971 endurance racing season, including 6 wins.

=== 1st batch ===
78-80 machines were made in November 1971 and were also available to the public. This is generally considered the 'first batch' with 8,000 frame numbers. These had a modified swinging arms, longer exhausts with shorter silencers, and a fibreglass tank. Compression ratio was increased to 9.6:1 by using Mondial pistons giving 70 bhp (52 kW) @ 7,300 rpm. A close ratio gearbox was fitted and a Ceriani front brake was available as an option.

=== 2nd batch ===
A second batch was produced in early 1972 with 11,000 frame numbers. These had a revised fairing, seat and exhaust.

=== 1973 ===
As we learned after extensive researches (2024), at least four SFCs were made in 1973 for racing and development use, most probably with engine numbers in the 14,000 series. A new lower frame "low boy" has been introduced. They were fitted with magnesium front and rear hubs, front and rear hydraulic Brembo disk brakes, magnesium crankcases, new heads with a single row cam chain and a lighter crankshafts. An alternator replaced the Bosch dynamo. These changes made the engines fragile and the bikes difficult to ride so the new parts weren't used on subsequent machines.

According to Augusto Brettoni, this new engine was really efficient, but indeed "fragile" because of the distribution chain.

=== 3rd batch ===
In 1974, 222 SFCs were built, just under half of these being exported to the US as street legal production racers. The frame was lowered, bigger forks fitted and the bodywork revised. Twin 280 mm (11 in) Brembo disc brakes were fitted on the front with a single disc on the rear. The engine was modified with a larger oil pump, lighter crankshaft and conrods, a higher 9.9:1 compression ratio and modified valves. The carbs were changed to 36 mm (1.4 in) Dell'Ortos. Power output was 75 bhp (56 kW) at 7,500rpm. A magnesium rear hub was fitted and the gearbox cover was also magnesium. This third batch had 16,000 frame numbers for the European machines and 17,000 for the US machines which were fitted with Nippon-Denso speedos, turn indicators and other items to comply with federal regulations.

=== 4th batch ===
The 4th batch (18,000 frame numbers) was known as the 'Electronica' and was fitted with electronic ignition and an oil cooler. The engines were modified with 10.5:1 compression ratio, revised head and an optional higher-lift cam. The final 33 machines were fitted with cast wheels.

In 1985, the factory intended to produce 200 replicas of the 750SFC but these never went into production.

=== Palmelli ===
In 1997, the British company Palmelli began to produce replica SFCs in small quantities. These were marketed by the former Laverda UK importers, Slater Bros. They also produced an 878 cc (53.6 cu in) cc version in 1998 with a 90° crank and a new frame with monoshock rear suspension.

== Gallery ==
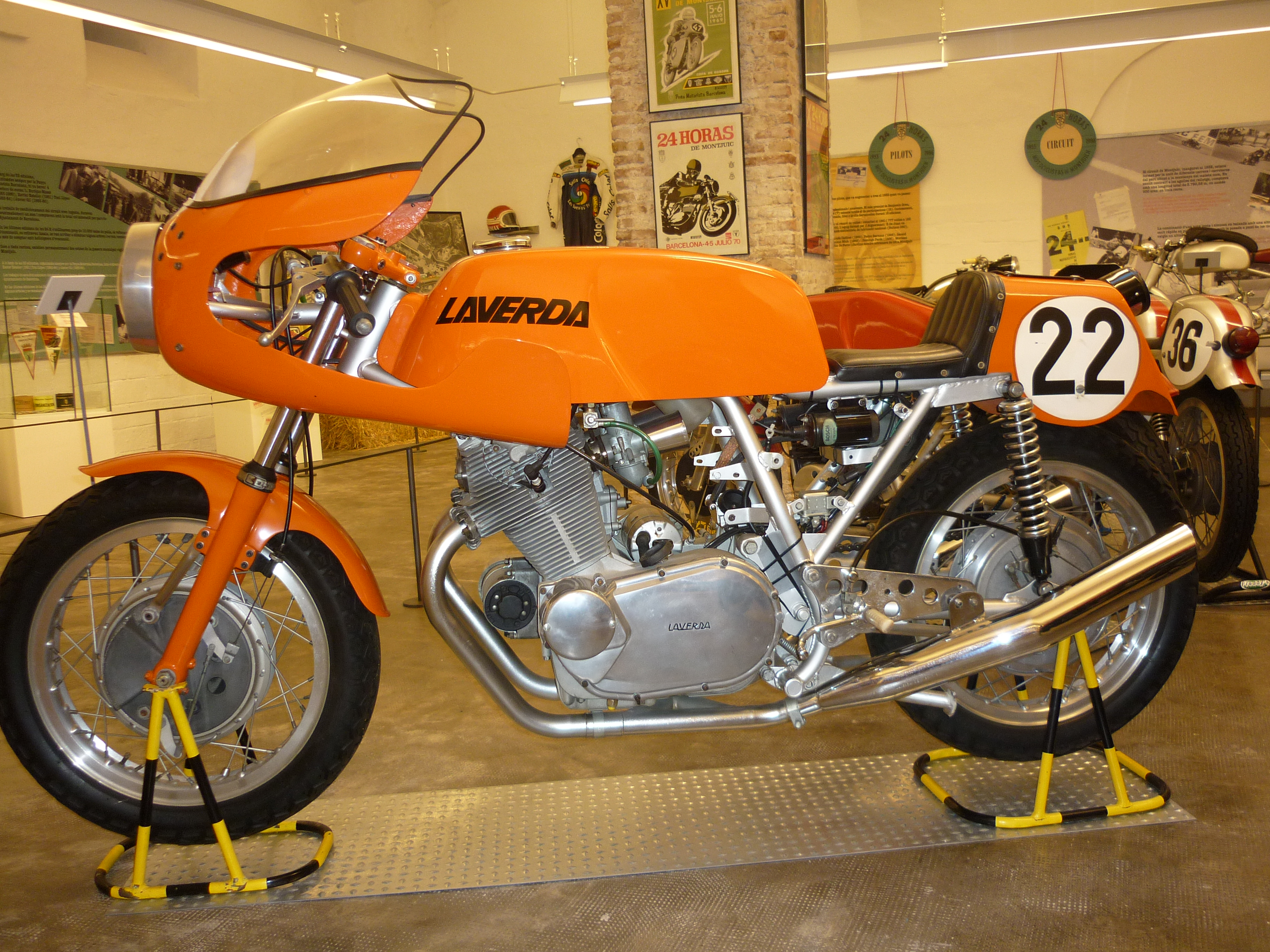
5,000 series bike on which Augusto Brettoni and Sergio Angiolini won the 1971 24 Hours of Montjuïc

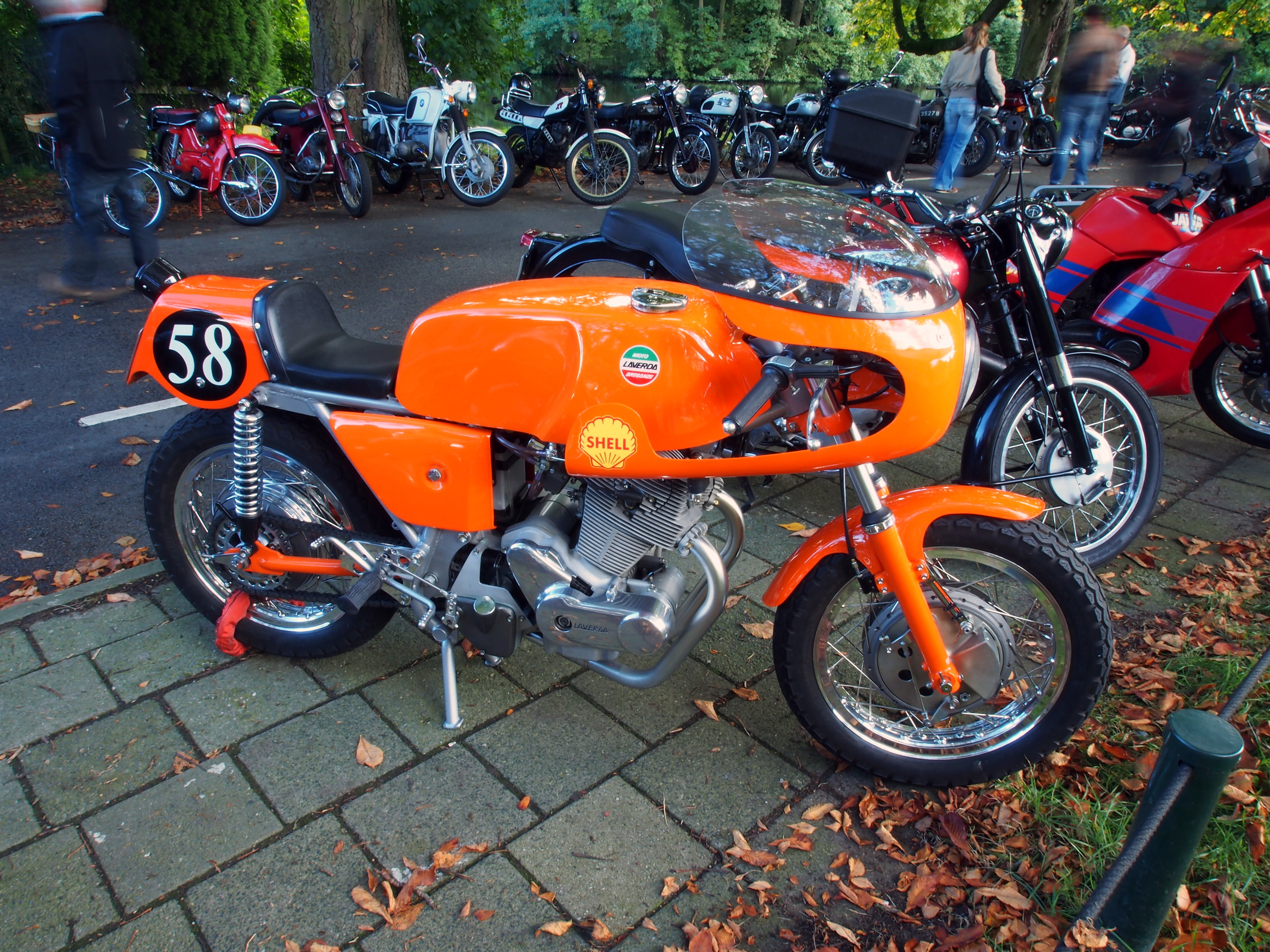
8,000 series bike with optional Ceriani front brake

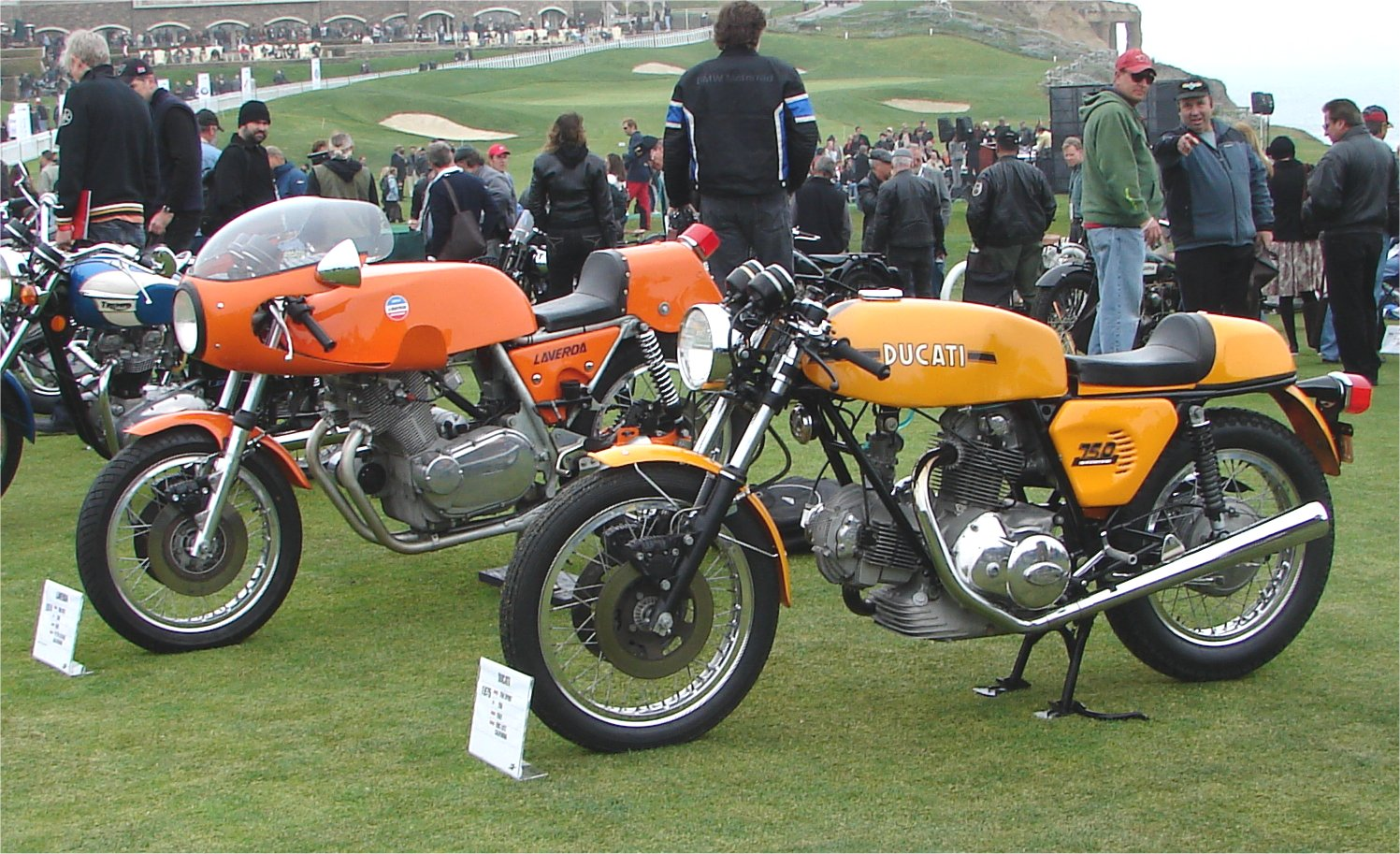
1974 16,000 series alongside a 1973 Ducati 750 Sport

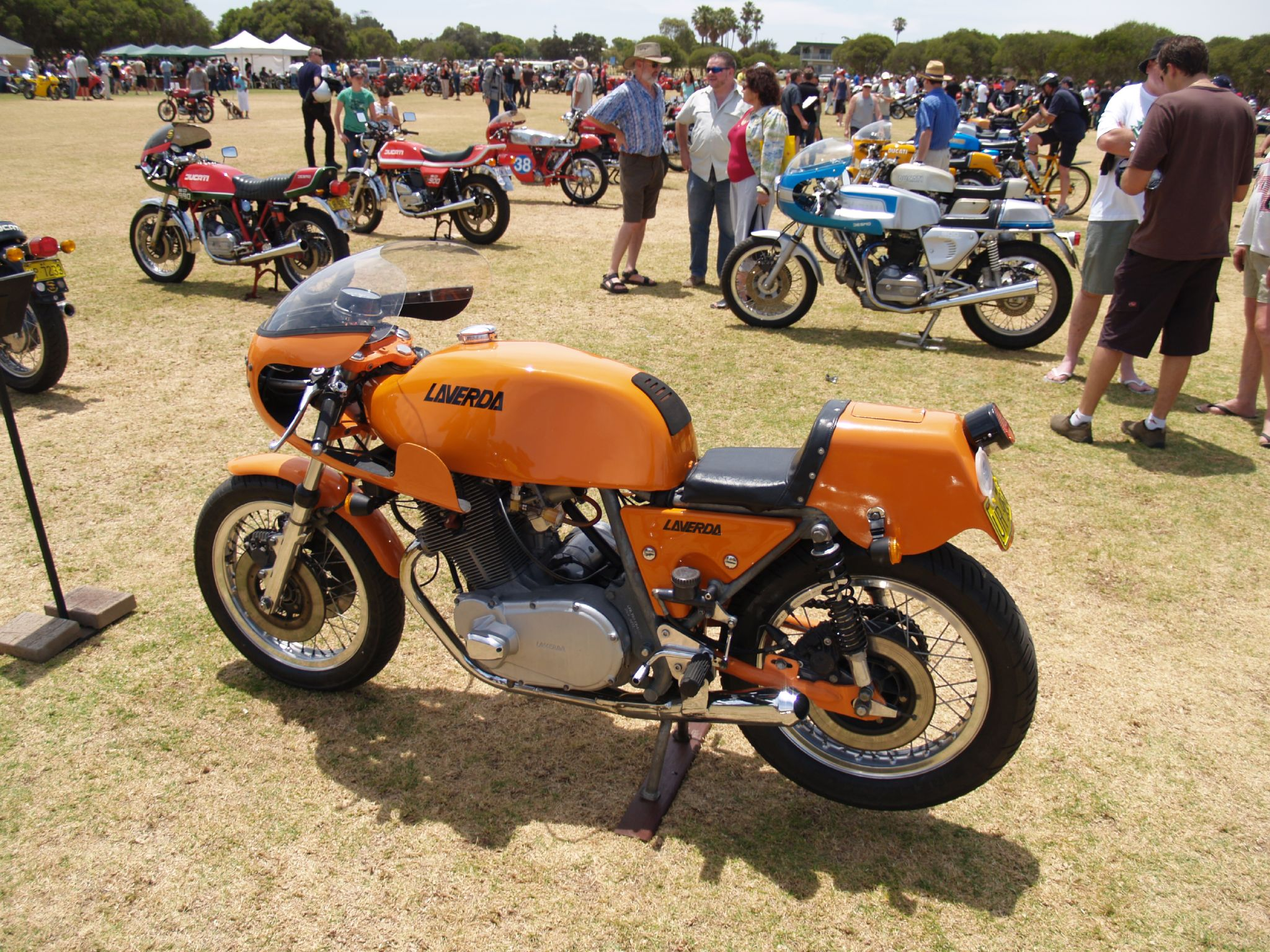
1975 18000 series

== Technical details ==
=== Engine and transmission ===
The SOHC all-alloy twin engine was of unit construction with horizontally split crankcases which helped keeping the engine oil-tight. 4 main bearings supported the crankshaft and the big ends were double-row roller bearings. A duplex chain drove the camshaft and the electric starter used a single chain. A dynamo was mounted on the right end of the crank and the oil pump and points were on the left, which made a wide engine for a twin. Ignition was by points and coil with power supplied by a belt driven Bosch 150 watt dynamo.

A triplex chain took power to the 7 plate wet clutch. A 5 speed gearbox was fitted and final drive was by chain.

=== Cycle parts ===
A spine frame was used which didn't have downpipes but used the engine as a stressed member. Front suspension was by Ceriani telescopic forks and rear by swinging arm with twin Koni shock absorbers.

== Bibliography ==
- Aynsley, Phil (24 June 2021). "Iconic Italian Motorcycles | Laverda's 750 SFC". MCNews.
- Burgaleta, Pepe (28 December 2017). "Laverda 750 SFC, la naranja mecánica" [Laverda 750 SFC, the clockwork orange]. Motociclismo (in Spanish).
- Casonovas, Jose Maria (5 July 1971). "Triufo Italianos En Las ≪24 Horas de Montjuich≫" [Italian Triumph In The 24 Hours Of Montjuic]. Mundo Deportivo. p. 27.
- Font, L. (29 April 2009). "Laverda SFC 750, naranja añeja" [Laverda SFC 750, Aged Orange]. Motorpasion Moto (in Spanish).
- Garson, Paul (September 2005). "Lovin' the Laverda: Beauty Meets Brute Force in Breganze". Walneck's Classic Cycle Trader. pp. 129–133.
- Guyony, Philippe (20 September 2016). Vincent Motorcycles: The Untold Story since 1946. Poundbury, Dorchester, England: Veloce Publishing Ltd. ISBN 978-1-84584-902-3.
- Isles, Tim; van der Schalk, Marnix (1995). 750 SFC. International Laverda 750 SFC Register.
- Levenson, Corey Levenson (7 October 2011). "1974 Laverda 750 SFC". Motorcycle Classics.
- Lichter, Michael; d'Orleans, Paul (15 June 2014). Cafe Racers: Speed, Style, and Ton-Up Culture. Minneapolis, Minnesota: Motorbooks. ISBN 978-0-7603-4582-5.
- Minton, David (22 October 2012). "Road Test: Laverda SF750 part 1". Real Classic.
- Seeley, Alan (September 1998). "Reelin' In The Years" (PDF). Classic Bike. pp. 28–31.
- Sharkey, Alex (19 March 2021). Classic Bikes: Essential Transport. Character-19.
- "1977 Laverda Palmelli 750SFC Replica". Silverstone Auctions.
- "Laverda Motorcycles Massimo's Way". Cycle World. September 1985. pp. 38–39.
