= MV Agusta 250B =

- Manufacturer: MV Agusta
- Also called: MV Agusta 250 Bicilindrica
- Production: 1968-1971
- Assembly: Cascina Costa, Italy
- Engine: 247 cc (15 cu in) air-cooled four-stroke OHV parallel twin
- Bore / stroke: 53 mm × 56 mm (2.1 in × 2.2 in)
- Compression ratio: 9:1
- Top speed: 135 Km/h (83 mph)
- Power: 23 bhp (17 kW) @ 7,500 rpm
- Transmission: Wet, multi-plate clutch, unit construction 5-speed gearbox, chain drive
- Frame type: Tubular and pressed steel open loop
- Suspension: Front: telescopic forks Rear: swinging arm with hydraulic dampers
- Brakes: Front: 200 mm drum brake Rear: 200 mm drum brake
- Tires: Front: 2.75 x 18; Rear: 3.25 x 18
- Wheelbase: 1,300 mm
- Dimensions: L: 1,960 mm W: 620 mm
- Weight: 140 kg (dry)

The MV Agusta 250B (Bicilindrica) was a motorcycle produced by the Italian manufacturer MV Agusta from 1968 to 1971. The motorcycle was first introduced at the 1965 Milan EICMA motorcycle show and was based on the stillborn MV 166 Arno GT. The model was discontinued in 1971 following the introduction of an overbored version, the 350B.

== History ==
During the 1960s the Italian motorcycle industry was in decline and sales were falling. New machines from the Italian manufacturers were introduced at the 1964 Milan EICMA Show. MV Agusta presented the new twin-cylinder 166 Arno GT. The machine was well received, and Motociclismo magazine described it as one of the only three innovative machines at the show. (The other two being the Laverda 200 Sport and the Ducati 250 Mach.)

Although the machine was a success at the show, MV decided it needed to follow the trend of increasing the capacity of lightweights to 200 or 250 cc. The 166 Arno GT was developed into a 250 and shown at the 1965 show. Although the Arno was a sport machine, the 250 was introduced as more of an everyday machine.

Despite being first shown in 1965, production didn't begin until 1968. During that time the engine was reworked. Initially designated the 250 Bicilindrica, the model name was shortened to 250B in 1969.

The styling of the machine was influenced by the Japanese machines of this time. The tank, with its chrome sides and black rubber knee grips, is very similar to that of the Suzuki T20 Super Six. The styling was shared with the MV 600 four which was introduced in the same year. The machine was available in light blue, black with a red tank or all black.

Sales were not high (1,452 units total) and in 1970 an overbored version, the 350B, was introduced. Production of the 250 stopped the next year.

=== Arno 166 GT ===
The Arno 166 GT was fitted with a new design of engine. Only the oil pump and gearbox, which came from the then current 125, were not new components. The wet-sump, OHV, parallel twin engine had a bore and stroke of 46.5 x 49 mm. The barrels and cylinder head were cast in alloy. Breathing through two Dell'Orto MA 15B carburettors, the engine produced 12 bhp (9 kW).

The frame followed MV's usual practice of using tubes for the front sections and pressed steel at the rear. Instead of the usual cradle, the frame was an open loop type, with no frame members below the engine. The machine was styled as a sports machine with clip-on handlebars and a humped Radaelli seat. Ceriani forks and Grimeca drum brakes were fitted.

Five engines were built, two for bench testing and three built into bikes for road testing. Top speed was claimed to be 122 km/h (76 mph).

== Technical details ==
The four-stroke parallel twin OHV engine was derived from the stillborn Arno 166 GT, the bore being increased to 53 mm and stroke to 56 mm, giving a 247 cc displacement. Featuring alloy barrels and heads, the cylinders were inclined forward by 20 degrees. Two 22 mm Dell'Orto carburettors fed fuel to the engine, which had a compression ratio of 9:1. Lubrication employed a wet sump. Power output was 23 bhp (17 kW) @ 7,500 rpm.

A geared primary drive took power to the wet, multi-plate clutch. The unit construction gearbox had 5 speeds, and final drive was by chain.

For the chassis, MV's usual single-beam frame in steel tube and sheet metal was used, but with an open loop design. Telescopic forks were used on the front, and rear suspension was by swinging arm and twin shock absorbers. Brakes were drums front and rear and spoked wheels were fitted.

== 250 B Scrambler ==
A scrambler version with on-off-road configuration was introduced in 1969. The machine had high-level exhausts and high handlebars. It was finished in silver with a red line on the tank. The machine was not well received in Italy and only 52 machines were built before production stopped in 1970.
