= Bridgestone 350 GTR =

- Manufacturer: Bridgestone
- Production: 1967–1971
- Class: Standard
- Engine: Air-cooled 345 cc (21.1 cu in) two-stroke parallel-twin
- Bore / stroke: 61 mm × 59 mm (2.4 in × 2.3 in)
- Top speed: 95 mph (153 km/h)
- Power: 37 hp (27.6 kW; 37.5 PS) @ 7,500 rpm
- Transmission: 6-speed, chain drive
- Frame type: Steel twin-cradle
- Suspension: Front: gaitered forks Rear: twin shock absorbers
- Brakes: Drum brakes front and rear
- Tyres: Bridgestone
- Weight: 160.6 kg (354 lb) (dry)
- Fuel consumption: 45 mpg_{‑US} (5.2 L/100 km; 54 mpg_{‑imp})

The Bridgestone 350 GTR was a standard motorcycle built by the motorcycle division of Bridgestone from 1967 until 1971. It had an air-cooled 345 cc (21.1 cu in) two-stroke Straight-twin engine, which produced 37 hp (27.6 kW; 37.5 PS) at 7,500 rpm, and could hit a claimed top speed of 95 mph (153 km/h). A roadtest article in Motorcycle Mechanics magazine dated April 1968 puts the top speed as 108 mph and the average mpg as 65. Standing start 1/4 mile was 91mph in 15 seconds.

Approximately 9,000 units were built. It was the last motorcycle built by the company, as they opted to focus on producing tyres instead.

== Design ==
Introduced in 1967, the 350 GTR was, for its time, a middleweight displacement motorcycle, and used an air-cooled, 345 cc (21.1 cu in), two-stroke, straight-twin engine, which produced 37 hp (27.6 kW; 37.5 PS) at 7,500 rpm. Although a mostly conventional design, the engine used a rotary disc-valve induction system, allowing more precise management of the gasses inside the engine than traditional piston-port systems did. Two of these disc valves were used (one per cylinder), and a 26 mm Mikuni carburettor was bolted to each one. The six-speed gearbox was also a plus point, as was the ability for the 350 GTR's riders to use either their left foot or their right foot to change gear; the gear lever and rear brake pedals could be swapped around in order to allow this. However, the gearbox did cause issues for some riders, as neutral was located in an unusual place; at the top of the gearbox, as most motorcycles placed this gear between first and second. Chassis-wise, the 350 GTR was fairly conventional, as it used a steel twin-cradle frame, gaitered front forks with twin shock absorbers at the rear, 19" wheels and drum brakes.

== Reception and sales ==
As Bridgestone were not known for their motorcycles, the public were generally skeptical about the 350 GTR, and the bike's high price (close to the much bigger Triumph Bonneville) meant that sales were low; just 9,000 bikes were built between 1967 and 1971. This would be the last motorcycle that Bridgestone ever produced. However, reviewers both past and present have generally been very positive about the motorcycle. Cycle praised the bike's engine, transmission and brakes, also stating that "Never before have so many advanced features been incorporated into a single package." Cycle World praised the bike's styling, its comfortable riding position, and stated that it was "as big and as fast as any 500." Roland Brown of Motorcycle Classics praised the bike's usability, and the responsive nature of the engine.
