= Laverda 650GT =

Italian 650 cc parallel twin motorcycle

- Manufacturer: Laverda
- Production: 1968
- Assembly: Breganze, Italy
- Successor: Laverda 750GT
- Class: Standard
- Engine: 654 cc (39.9 cu in) Air cooled SOHC 4 stroke parallel twin
- Bore / stroke: 75 mm × 74 mm (3.0 in × 2.9 in)
- Top speed: 175 km/h (109 mph)
- Power: 50 bhp (37 kW) @ 6,800 rpm
- Transmission: Wet clutch, 5 speed, chain drive
- Frame type: Spine
- Suspension: Front: telescopic forks Rear: swinging arm, twin shocks
- Brakes: Drum

The Laverda 650GT is an 654 cc (39.9 cu in) air cooled SOHC 4 stroke parallel twin motorcycle produced by the Italian manufacturer Laverda in 1968. Only around 50 machines were produced before it was superseded by an enlarged 750 cc version. The engine design drew heavily from the Honda CB77.

== History ==
Laverda's production was of small capacity singles and twins. General manager, Massimo Laverda, visited the US in 1964 to study the market there. On his return he persuaded his father, Laverda motorcycles founder Francesco Laverda, that to succeed in the US they needed to produce a larger capacity twin. Massimo Laverda brought three motorcycles, a Honda CB77, Norton 650SS and a BMW R69S which were stripped and examined. Although the Laverda took elements from all three, the Luciano Zen designed 654 cc (39.9 cu in) engine was heavily based on the Honda. Bosch electrics were chosen for reliability.

A prototype was shown at the November 1966 Earls Court Show in London. The engine's Honda origins being noticeable. Soon after the show the crankshaft phasing was changed from the original 180° to 360° to improve torque delivery. In 1967, American Jack McCormack visited the factory and rode the prototype. McCormack, who had previously worked in marketing for Triumph, Honda and Suzuki in the US, intended to market Laverdas in the US under the American Eagle brand. Feeling US buyers would prefer a 750 cc machine, he persuaded the factory to enlarge the twin.

Laverda entered a 650 and 3 750s into the Giro d’Italia endurance race in May 1968. The 650 won its class and the 750s all finished in the top 10.

Production began in May 1968 but only about 50 machines were made as the factory concentrated on the 750 cc requested by the US importer. The model was known for its quality, using quality components such as Pankl con-rods, Ceriani suspension, Bosch electrics and a Nippon Denso electric starter. The spine frame and Ceriani suspension gave the bike superior handling.

== Technical details ==
=== Engine and transmission ===
The SOHC all-alloy twin engine was of unit construction with horizontally split crankcases which helped keeping the engine oil-tight. 4 main bearings supported the crankshaft and the big ends were double-row roller bearings. A duplex chain drove the camshaft and the electric starter used a single chain. A dynamo was mounted on the right end of the crank and the oil pump and points were on the left, which made a wide engine for a twin. The engine has been described as 'over-engineered' and 'unburstable'. Ignition was by points and coil with power supplied by a belt driven Bosch 150 watt dynamo.

A triplex chain took power to the 7 plate wet clutch. A 5 speed gearbox was fitted and final drive was by chain.

=== Cycle parts ===
A spine frame was used which didn't have downpipes but used the engine as a stressed member. Front suspension was by Ceriani telescopic forks and rear by swinging arm with twin shock absorbers. Drum brakes were used, the front being a 230 mm Grimeca twin leading shoe item.

== Bibliography ==
- Aynsley, Phil (16 August 2018). "Laverda 650 Twin | The 'modern' Laverda story". MCNews.
- Backus, Richard (January–February 2009). "Laverda 750SF". Motorcycle Classics. Archived from the original on 8 June 2011.
- Cloesen, Uli (15 August 2014). Italian Café Racers. Dorcester: Veloce Publishing Ltd. ISBN 978-1-84584-749-4.
- Garson, Paul (September 2005). "Lovin' the Laverda: Beauty Meets Brute Force in Breganze". Walneck's Classic Cycle Trader. pp. 129–133.
- Hoseason, Rowena (19 November 2019). "Laverda 750 SF (1971) – Classic Review". Bennetts UK.
- Levenson, Corey Levenson (7 October 2011). "1974 Laverda 750 SFC". Motorcycle Classics.
- Minton, David (22 October 2012). "Road Test: Laverda SF750 part 1". Real Classic.
- Saunders, Andy (August 1991). "The Short Flight of the American Eagle". American Motorcyclist. pp. 16–18.
