= Laverda 350/500 =

Series of Italian parallel twin motorcycles

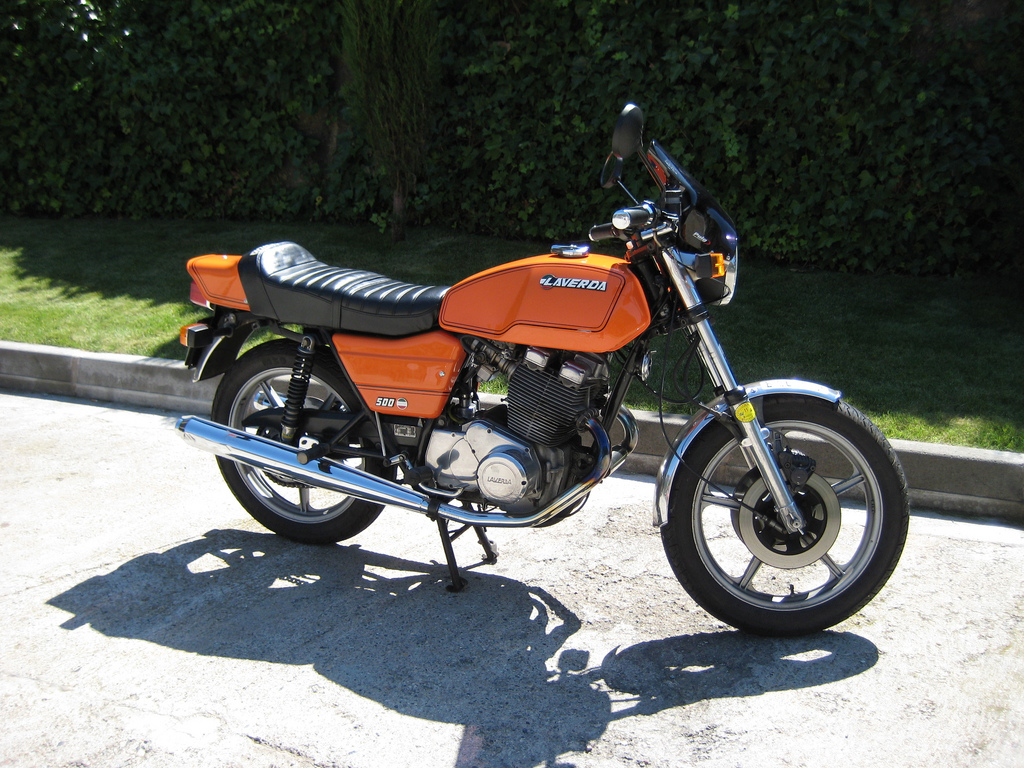
- Laverda 500S
- Manufacturer: Laverda
- Production: 1977-1983
- Assembly: Breganze, Italy
- Engine: Air cooled DOHC 4 stroke parallel twin
- Bore / stroke: 60 mm × 61 mm (2.4 in × 2.4 in) (350); 72 mm × 61 mm (2.8 in × 2.4 in) (500)
- Compression ratio: 8.7:1 (350); 9.6:1 (500T)
- Top speed: 172.5 km/h (107.2 mph) (500T)
- Power: 30 bhp (22 kW) (350); 44 bhp (33 kW) @ 9,500 rpm (500T)
- Transmission: Wet clutch, 5 speed, chain drive
- Suspension: Front: telescopic forks Rear: swinging arm, twin shock absorbers
- Brakes: Front: Twin discs Rear: Single disc
- Tyres: 110/90x18 front & rear
- Wheelbase: 1,425 mm (56.1 in)
- Weight: 175 kg (386 lb) (500T) (dry)
- Fuel capacity: 3 L (0.66 imp gal; 0.79 US gal) (500T)

The Laverda 350/500 is a series of 345 cc (21.1 cu in) and 497 cc (30.3 cu in) air cooled DOHC 4 stroke parallel twin motorcycles produced by the Italian manufacturer Laverda from 1977 to 1983. The engine was used as the basis of future 650, 650, 668 and 750 cc models. Around 5,000 of these models were produced in total.

== Background ==
The middleweight sector was an important market in Europe in the 1970s. Following the success of the 750 twins and 1000 triples, Laverda were keen to enter this market. To compete with the Japanese, the model would need to be high-tech. The 497 cc DOHC 8 valve twin was designed Luciano Zen and Adriano Valente. The bike was styled by Lino Borghesan.

The bike was first shown at the 1975 Milan Motorcycle Show but, owing to logistical and technical problems, wasn't put into production until 1977.

== Models ==
=== 350 ===
Shortly before the 500 was launched the Italian Government raised the sales tax on motorcycles over 350 cc from 18% to 35%. In response Laverda launched a 350 version on the home market in 1978. A few were imported to the UK but didn't sell well. The bore was reduced to 60 mm (2.4 in), smaller valves and 24 mm (0.94 in) Dell'Orto carburettors were fitted. With 30 bhp (22 kW) and weighing virtually the same as the 500, performance was uninspiring.

=== 500T ===
Launched in 1977 and originally called the Alpina, the name was changed to Alpino in the UK and Zeta in the US following objections from BMW. Noted for its good handling, vibrations and poor fuel consumption, the model was expensive compared to competitor's models and sales were low.

=== 500S ===
The 500S (Alpine S) was introduced in 1978 with revised styling. The engine was fitted with a balancer shaft.

=== Formula 500 ===
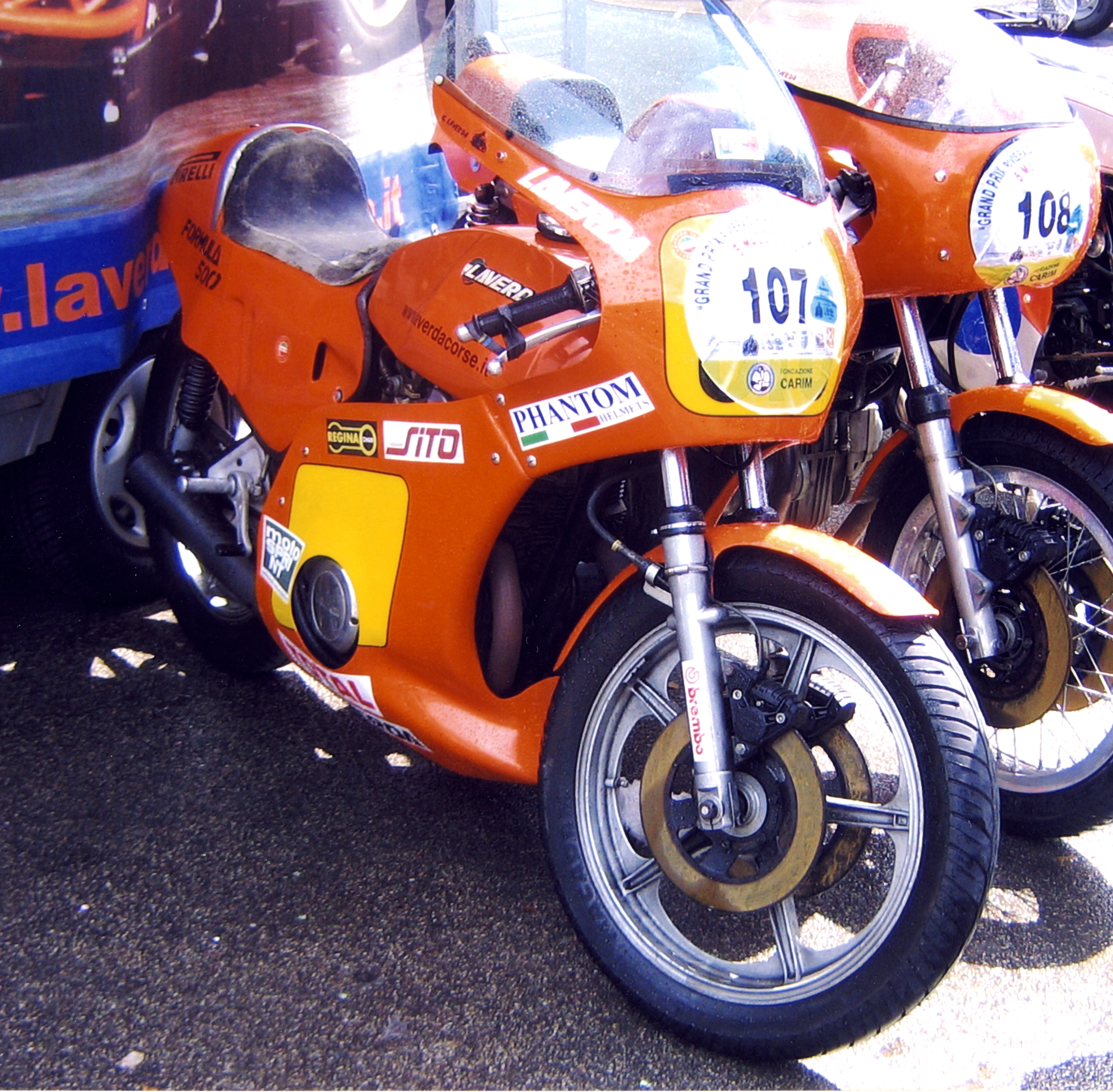
Laverda Formula 500

To counteract poor sales Laverda promoted the 500 by creating the Coppa Laverda (Laverda Cup), a one-make racing series. For this series a new model, the Formula 500, was created. All road equipment such as lights and speedo were stripped off and clip-on handlebars, rearset footrests, a one-piece tank and seat unit and a race fairing were fitted. The engine was tuned with S1 race cams and 10.5:1 forged pistons, producing around 52 bhp (39 kW) @ 9,500rpm. A larger oil pump and close-ratio gearbox were also fitted. An initial batch of 75 machines were produced and unveiled in March 1978.

Sanctioned by the Federazione Motociclistica Italiana, the Coppa Laverda was limited to riders under 30 who had not had a top 3 overall finish in any other series, and technical support was given by the factory. It proved popular and the 6 round series was run from 1978 to 1981 in Italy. Similar series were run in Belgium and Germany.

==== Formula 500 series 2 ====
A second batch was built in 1979. The one-piece seat/tank had hampered access to the engine, so the second series had a separate seat and tank. A third batch was built in 1980. Total production across the three batches was 210 machines.

==== Other racing results ====
A machine entered by the British Davies Team won the 500 class and was placed 8th overall in the 1978 24 Horas de Montjuïc. The 500 class win was repeated in 1979. 2 bikes were entered both years and a spare bike was available. These endurance racers had a smaller fairing, magnesium suspension and wheels and a 24 L (5.3 imp gal; 6.3 US gal) tank. Power output was increased to 58 bhp (43 kW) @ 10,500 rpm.

At the 1980 Isle of Man TT, 7 Laverda 500s were in the top 14 of the Formula 2 TT. 6 of these were entered by the UK importer Slater Brothers who won the team prize.

Ten bikes were prepared for the 1982 Italian TT2 championship. These were enlarged to 596 cc (36.4 cu in) and fitted with magnesium parts. They produced 72 bhp (54 kW) and were capable of 230 km/h (140 mph).

=== Montjuic ===
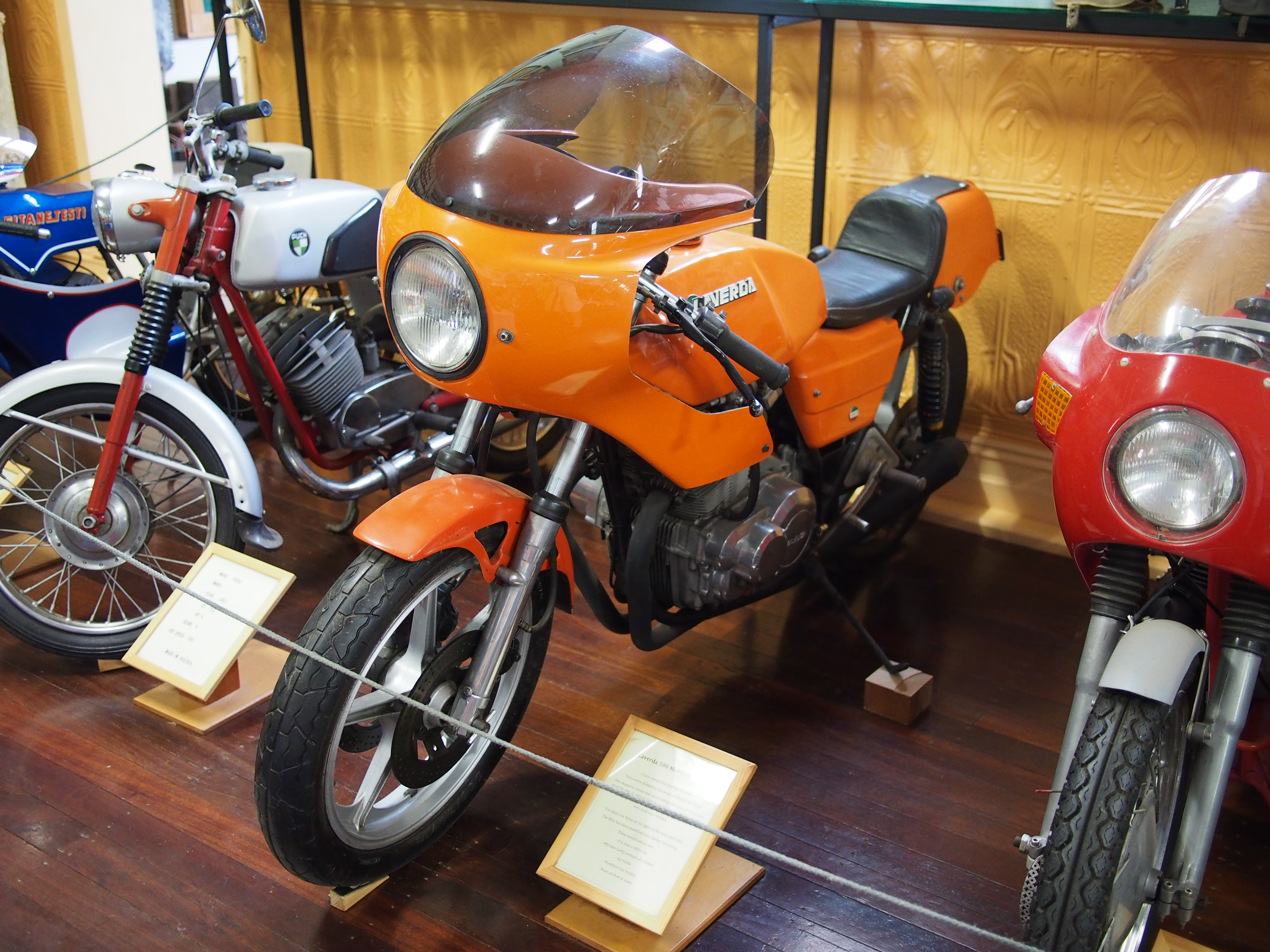
1979 Laverda 500 Montjuic

The Montjuic was UK only high performance model created initially by the UK importers Slater Brothers. Introduced in 1979, the engine was tuned with S1 cams, high compression pistons and a Sito exhaust and produced around 50 bhp (37 kW). The bikes were shipped to the UK bare where the bodywork and fairing, made by Screen and Plastics, were fitted. The bike was named after the Spanish circuit following the successes there.

==== Montjuic Mk2 ====
A second version was introduced in 1982 and had revised bodywork and a larger frame-mounted fairing. Soon after introduction strengthened camshaft bearing caps were fitted. Production continued until 1984. Total production for both marks of the Montjuic was around 250.

=== 500SFC ===
At the request of the German importer Witt, 50 cafe racer styled machines were produced for the German market in 1981. The exclusive model retailed at 8,590 DM.

== Technical details ==
=== Engine and transmission ===
The 180° 8-valve DOHC twin was of unit construction. A built-up crankshaft was supported on 3 ball and roller main bearings. Big ends were needle roller bearings. The alloy cylinders had liners. A chain between the cylinders drove the overhead camshafts.

Twin 32 mm Dell'Orto PHF pumper carburettors fed fuel to the engine and Bosch electronic ignition was fitted. Lubrication was wet sump.

Primary drive was by gears to the wet clutch and 6 speed gearbox. Final drive was by chain.

=== Cycle parts ===
A single downtube cradle frame was used. Suspension was by 35 mm (1.4 in) Marzocchi forks with a rear swinging arm and twin adjustable shock absorbers. Brakes were twin 260 mm (10 in) Brembo discs front and single disc rear. Laverda's own cast wheels were fitted. Switchgear and instruments were from Nippon Denso.

== Bibliography ==
- Abhi (13 October 2020). "1979 Laverda Formula 500". Bike-urious.
- Aynsley, Phil (13 September 2019). "1979 Laverda 500 Endurance Racer | The ultimate Laverda 500 twin!". MCNews.
- Blazquez, Luis (19 June 2018). "Moto del día: Laverda 500" [Bike of the day: Laverda 500]. espíritu RACER moto (in Spanish).
- Hewitt, Sam (7 May 2020). "From the archive: Made in Japan - Laverda 500: the twin that came oh, so close". Old Bike Mart.
- Huber, Huber (29 October 2018). "Ex-Slater Brothers Isle of Man TT – Laverda Formula 500". Bike-urious.
- Pullen, Greg (23 October 2018). A-Z of Italian Motorcycle Manufacturers. Wiltshire: The Crowood Press. ISBN 978-1-78500-488-9.
- Schwab, Ulrich (1987). Motorräder: 1970 - 1987; Typen, Daten u. Preise in Deutschland (in German). Stuttgart: Motorbuch-Verlag. ISBN 978-3-613-01172-4.
- Smith, Robert (13 February 2014). "Small Package Big Punch: Laverda Formula 500". Motorcycle Classics.
- Smith, Robert (13 February 2014). "Laverda Montjuic". Motorcycle Classics.
- "Laverda 500". Real Classic. 3 August 2019 – via PressReader.com.
- "Laverda 500 Zeta". Cycle World. July 1978.
- "Laverda 500 Zeta". Cycle. 1979. pp. 110–118. Archived from the original on 7 March 2022.
- "Leichtathlet" (PDF). Motorrad (in German) (13). 1981.
- "Little Twins - 1977 - c.1990". www.breganzane.com (in German). 2011.
