= Laverda 750 =

Italian 750 cc parallel twin motorcycle

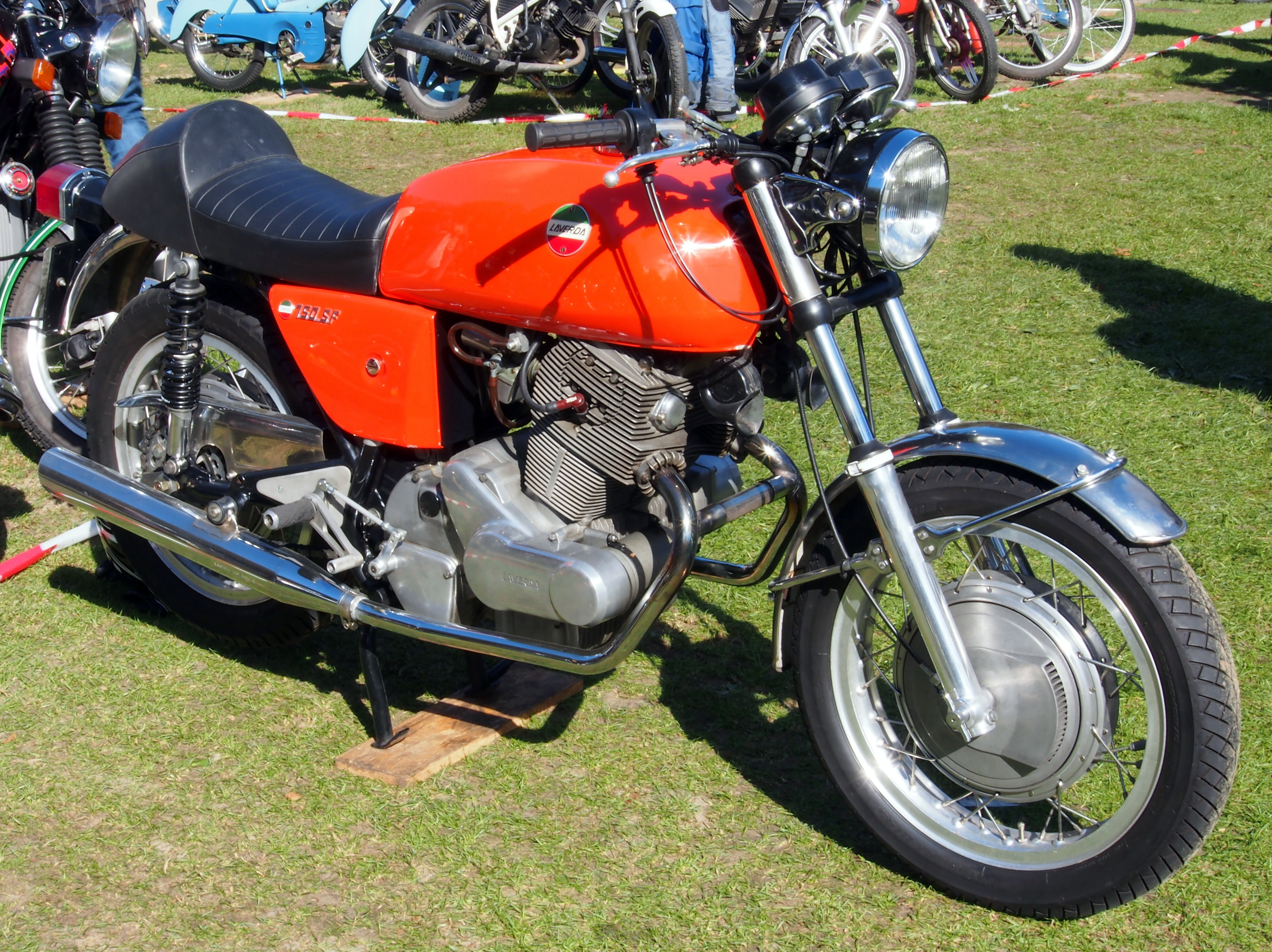
- Laverda 750SF
- Manufacturer: Laverda
- Production: 1968-1976
- Assembly: Breganze, Italy
- Predecessor: Laverda 650GT
- Engine: 744 cc (45.4 cu in) Air cooled SOHC 4 stroke parallel twin
- Bore / stroke: 80 mm × 74 mm (3.1 in × 2.9 in)
- Power: 50–75 bhp (37–56 kW)
- Transmission: Wet clutch, 5 speed, chain drive
- Frame type: Spine
- Suspension: Front: telescopic forks Rear: swinging arm, twin shocks
- Wheelbase: 1,460 mm (57 in)
- Weight: 485 lb (220 kg) (dry)

The Laverda 750 is a 744 cc (45.4 cu in) air cooled SOHC 4 stroke parallel twin motorcycle produced by the Italian manufacturer Laverda from 1968 to 1976. Developed from the company's 650, the engine's design drew heavily from the Honda CB77. Around 18,000 machines were produced.

== Development ==
Laverda's production was of small capacity singles and twins. General manager, Massimo Laverda, visited the US in 1964 to study the market there. On his return he persuaded his father, Laverda motorcycles founder Francesco Laverda, that to succeed in the US they needed to produce a larger capacity twin. Massimo Laverda brought three motorcycles, a Honda CB77, Norton 650SS and a BMW R69S which were stripped and examined. Although the Laverda took elements from all three, the Luciano Zen designed 650 cc (40 cu in) engine was heavily based on the Honda. Bosch electrics were chosen for reliability. The spine frame and Ceriani suspension gave the bike superior handling.

A prototype was shown at the November 1966 Earls Court Show in London. The engine's Honda origins being noticeable. Soon after the show the crankshaft phasing was changed from the original 180° to 360° to improve torque delivery. In 1967, American Jack McCormack visited the factory and rode the prototype. McCormack, who had previously worked in marketing for Triumph, Honda and Suzuki in the US, intended to market Laverdas in the US under the American Eagle brand. Feeling US buyers would prefer a 750 cc machine, he persuaded the factory to enlarge the twin.

Laverda entered a 650 and 3 750s into the Giro d’Italia endurance race in May 1968. The 650 won its class and the 750s all finished in the top 10.

== 750GT ==
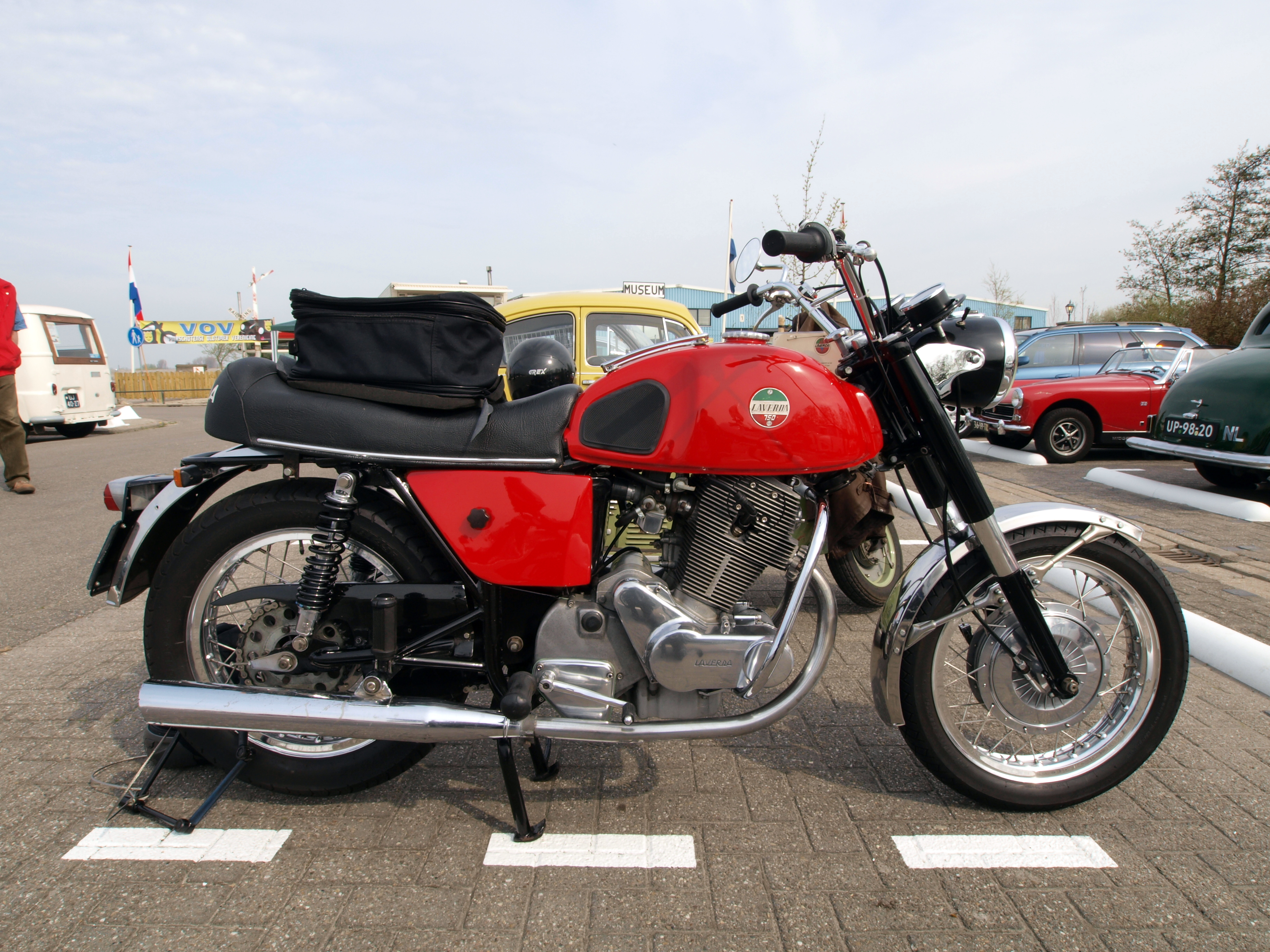
Laverda 750GT

Going into production in late 1968, the 750GT was the first in Laverda's line of 750s. The GT produced 52 bhp (39 kW) and continued to be produced until 1974 when it was superseded by the GTL.

== 750S ==
Launched in 1969, the 750S was a more sporting model than the GT and had a higher compression ratio and produced an extra 8 bhp. The new stronger frame was fitted.

== 750SF ==
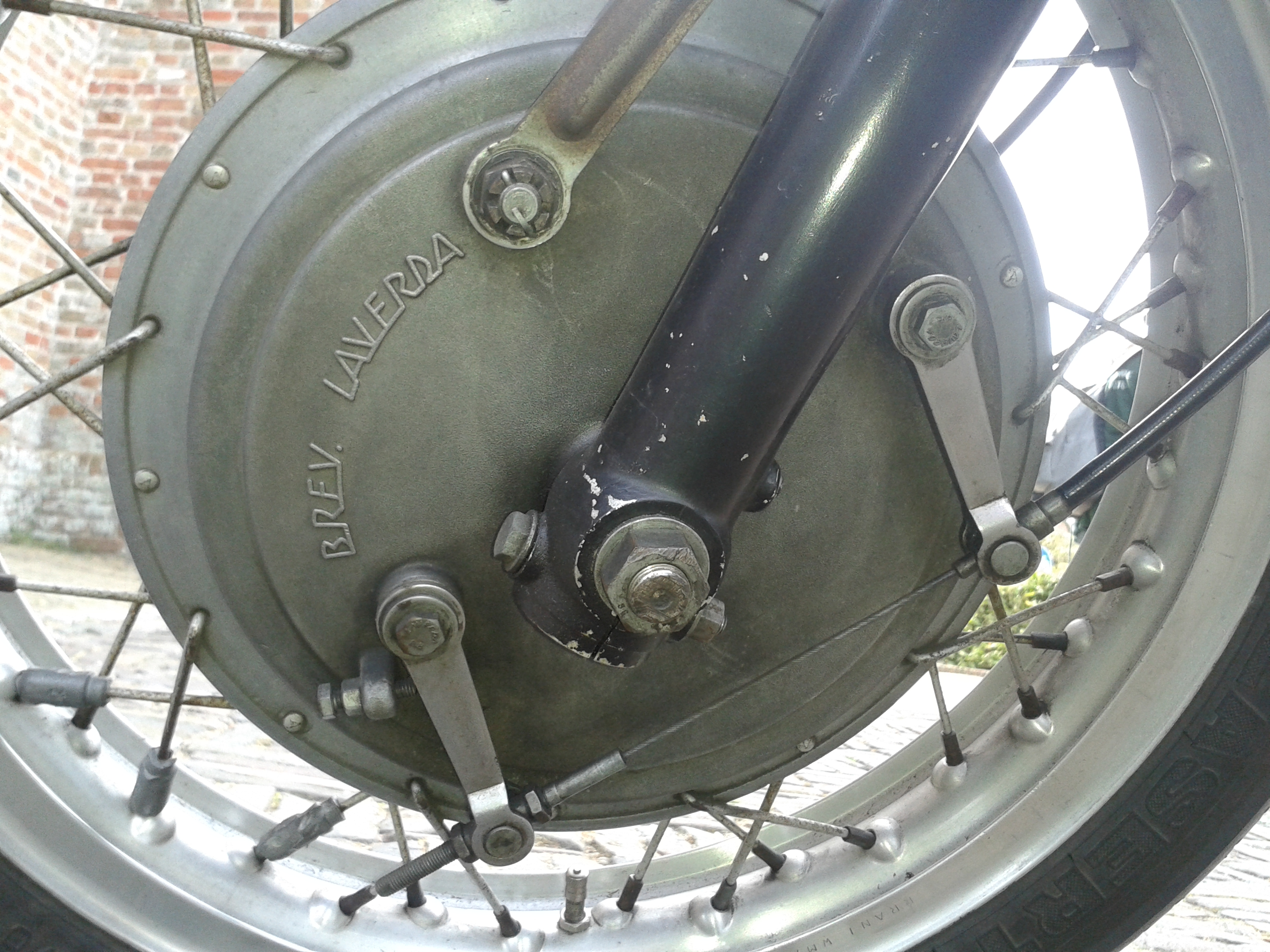
Laverda 750SF front brake

The 750SF was introduced in 1970 (SF standing for Super Freni eng. Super Brakes) replacing the S model. It used a new frame and was fitted with a 230 mm (9.1 in) twin leading shoe designed by Francesco Laverda rather than the Grimeca item previously used. A balance-pipe was fitted to the exhaust downpipes. The machines were available in a wide range of metallic colours.

The SF models were imported to the UK by Slater Bros and sold in kit form to avoid paying Purchase Tax. Around 18,000 of the SF variants were produced in total.

=== SF1 ===
An upgraded model, the SF1, was introduced in 1973. This used Nippon Denso speedo and rev-counters rather than the Smiths instruments previously used. The crankshaft was strengthened and bigger 36 mm (1.4 in) Dell'Orto pumper carbs fitted. Although the compression ratio had been lowered power output increased to 66 bhp (49 kW) at 7300rpm. A new exhaust was fitted with a larger diameter (1.6 in (41 mm)) with a large collector box under the engine. The collector box often grounded when cornering.

=== SF2 ===
The model was again updated in 1974 with the addition of a Brembo front disc brake. This was soon upgraded to twin front discs. A dualseat became standard.

The gearshift was changed to the left side for the US market in 1975 and roller bearings replaced the swinging arm bush.

=== SF3 ===
The final model in the series was introduced in 1976 and had a rear disc brake, cast wheels and a new seat with a fibreglass cowl. The brakes were praised in contemporary road tests. Laverda redesigned the engine of the SF to be lighter and narrower but this never reached production. Production ended in 1976 but the model was available into 1977.

=== Racing ===
Prior to the introduction of the SFC, the SF was used in long-distance production racing. Amongst the success in 1970 were:

- Monza 500km - 1st and 3rd
- Circuit Paalgraven, Oss 24hr - 1st, 2nd and 3rd
- Circuit Paalgraven, Oss 6hr - 1st
- Bol d'Or 24hr - 3rd and 6th
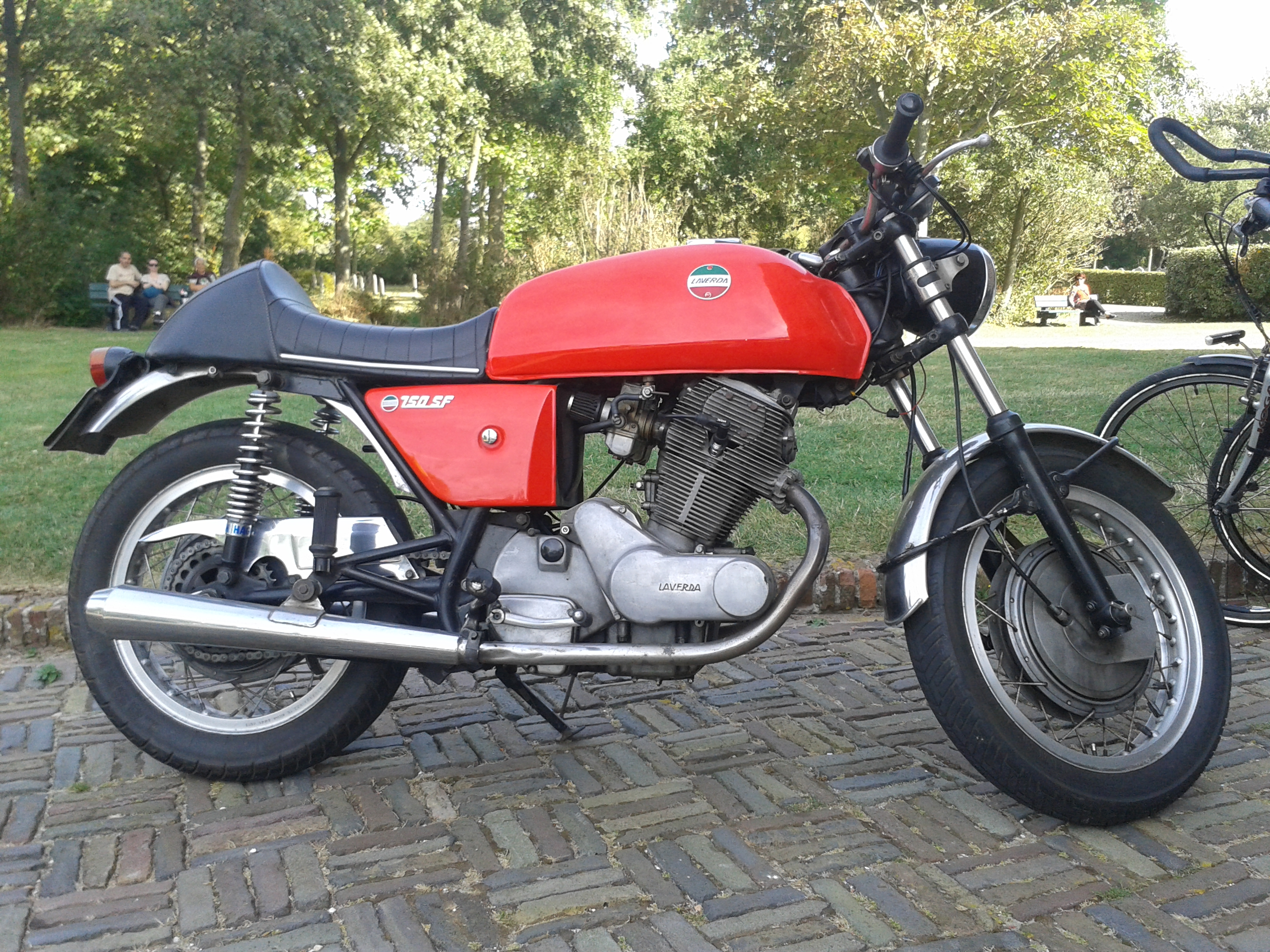
1971/2 Laverda 750SF

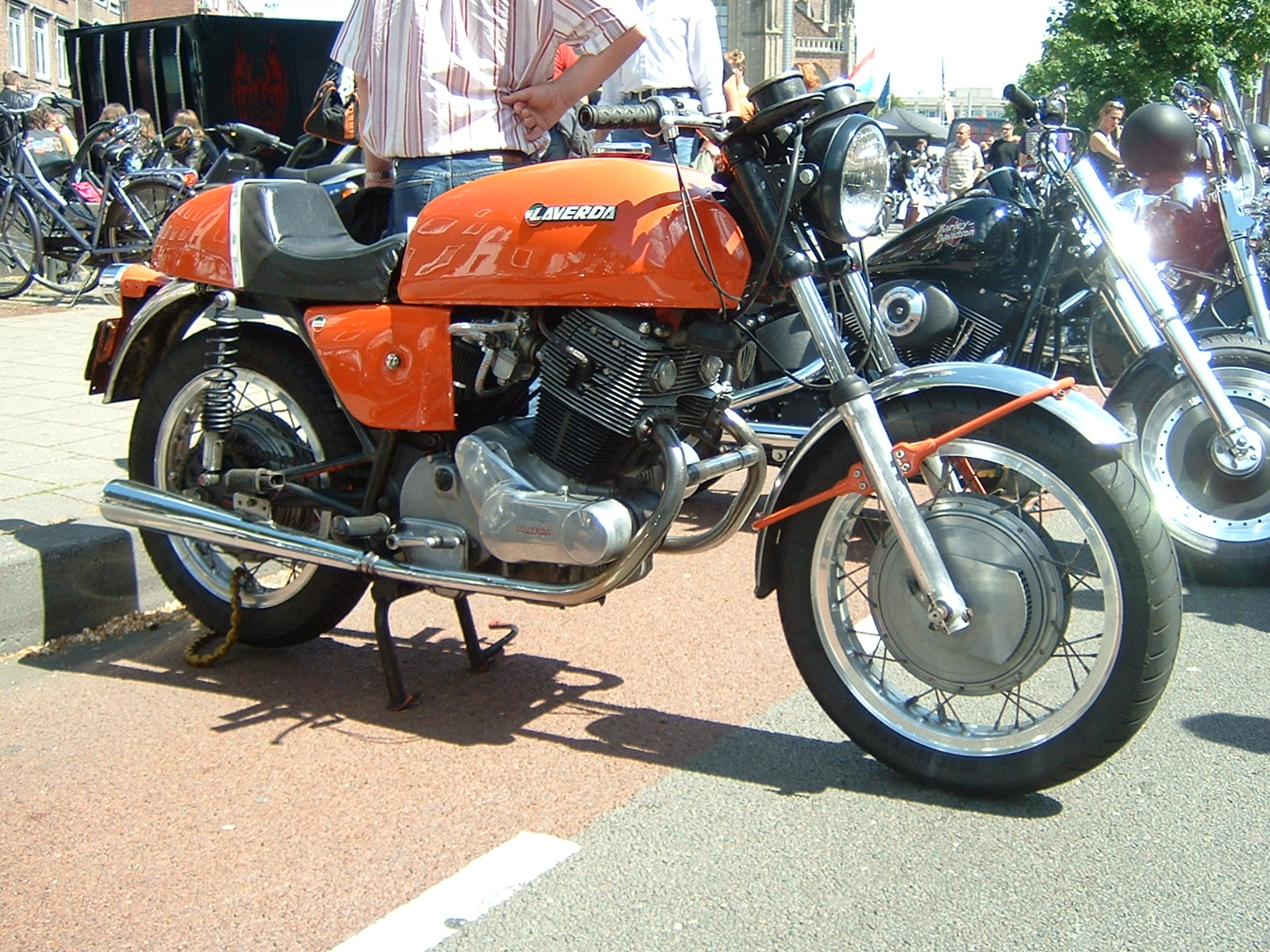
Laverda 750SF1

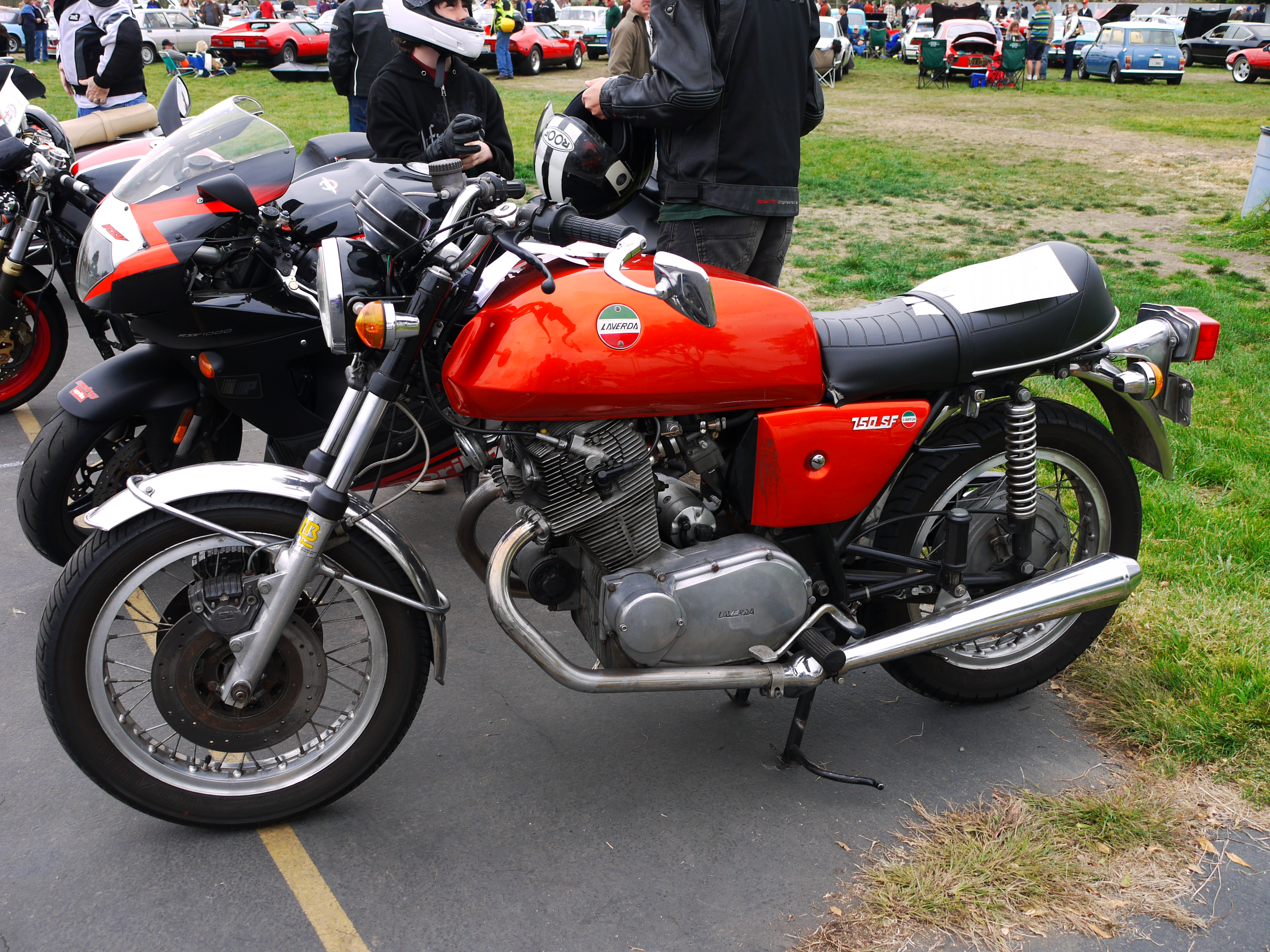
Laverda 750SF1

== 750SFC ==
Introduced in May 1971, the SFC (Super Freni Competizione) was an evolution of the SF and drew from the racers used at the 1970 Bol d'Or. It was a hand-built, full factory production racer finished in orange with a distinctive half-fairing. The machine was made in batches, with each batch identified by the frame number range. In total 549 SFCs were manufactured.

== 750GTL ==
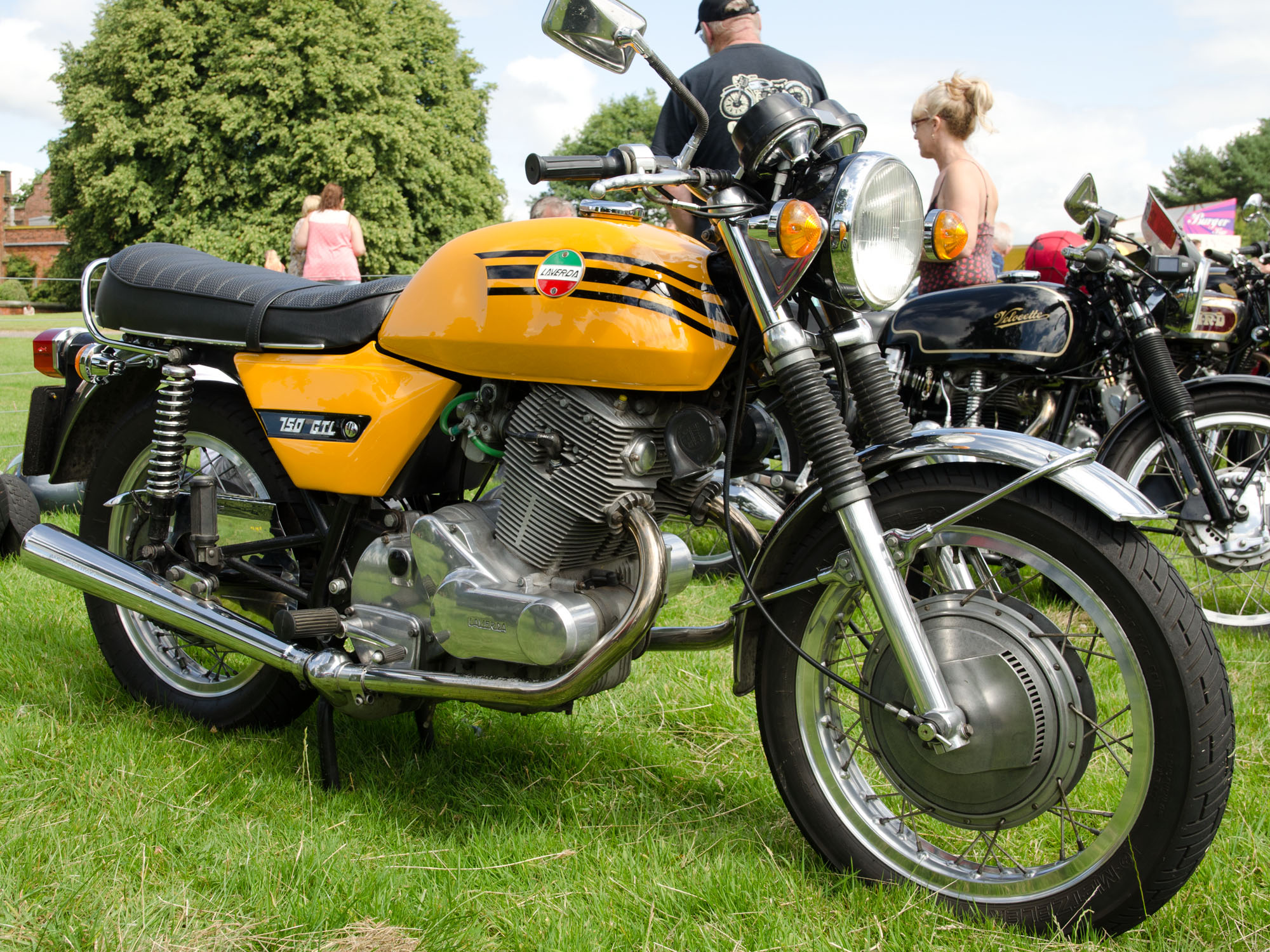
Laverda 750GTL

Introduced in 1974, the GTL used the GT engine in SF cycle parts. A large tank and touring handlebars were fitted. Production ended in 1977. Several police forces used the GTL including the Italian Polizia Urbana

== American models ==
The 750s imported to the US under the American Eagle brand were fitted with 'buckhorn' handlebars, a fibreglass tank and a restyled seat. The first models offered was the 750 Classic, which used a 60 bhp (45 kW) engine. This was soon renamed the 750 Road Sport when a second model, the 750 Super Sport, was added. The Super Sport used a 68 bhp (51 kW) engine. To publicise the brand, McCormack sponsored Evel Knievel to use 750 Eagles for his stunts.

American Eagle folded in 1970, having sold less than 100 750 twins, including 20-30 machines fitted with a duplex frame designed by Leopardo Tartarini. US West Coast Husqvarna importer Edison Dye became the US importer and imported the models under the Laverda brand and without the 'Americanised' changes.

== Technical details ==
=== Engine and transmission ===
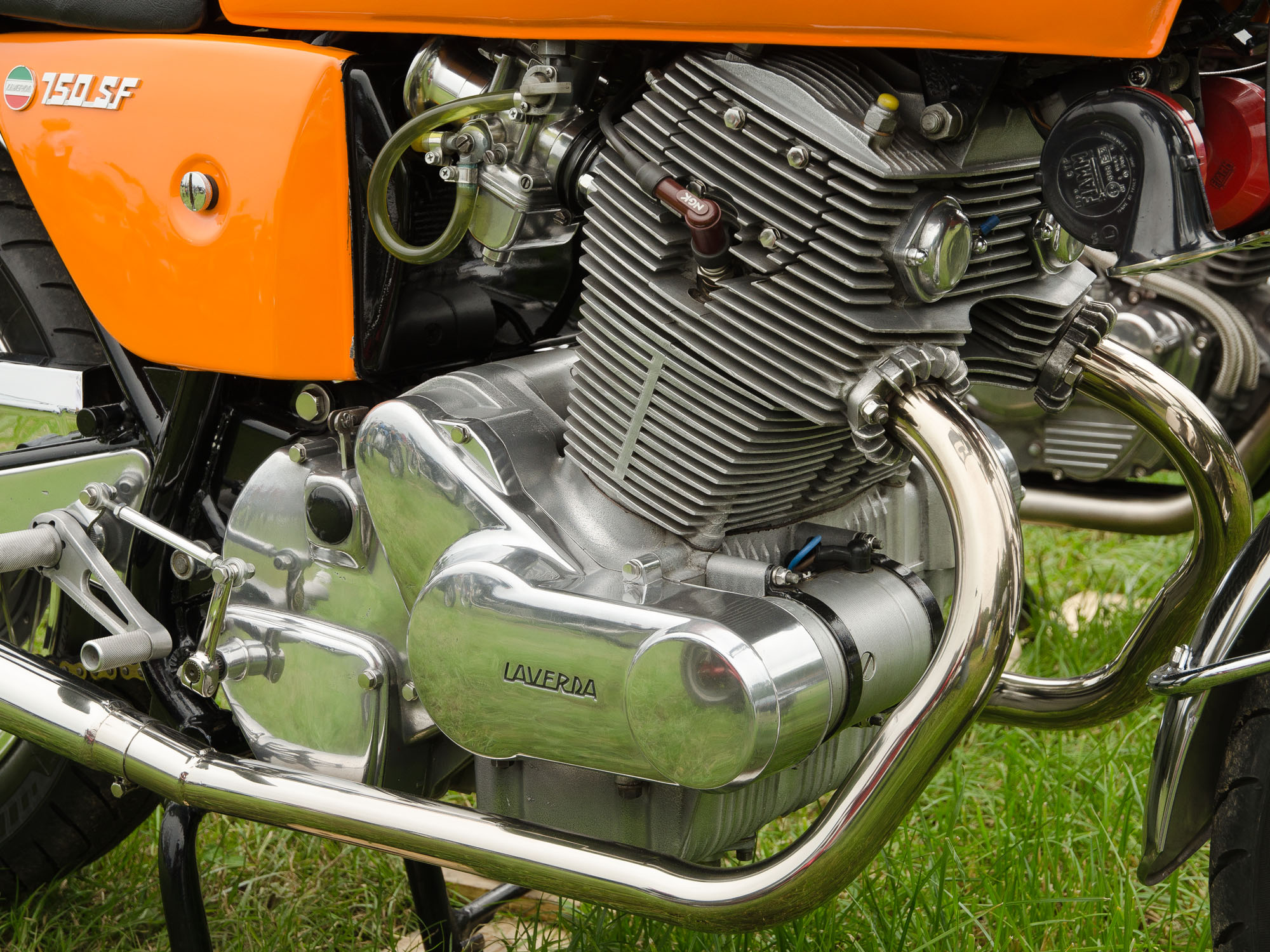
Laverda 750SF engine

The SOHC all-alloy twin engine was of unit construction with horizontally split crankcases which helped keeping the engine oil-tight. 4 main bearings supported the crankshaft and the big ends were double-row roller bearings. A duplex chain drove the camshaft and the electric starter used a single chain. A dynamo was mounted on the right end of the crank and the oil pump and points were on the left, which made a wide engine for a twin. The engine has been described as 'over-engineered' and 'unburstable'. Ignition was by points and coil with power supplied by a belt driven Bosch 150 watt dynamo.

A triplex chain took power to the 7 plate wet clutch. A 5 speed gearbox was fitted and final drive was by chain.

=== Cycle parts ===
A spine frame was used which didn't have downpipes but used the engine as a stressed member. Front suspension was by Ceriani telescopic forks and rear by swinging arm with twin shock absorbers.

== Bibliography ==
- Aynsley, Phil (24 June 2021). "Iconic Italian Motorcycles | Laverda's 750 SFC". MCNews.
- Backus, Richard (January–February 2009). "Laverda 750SF". Motorcycle Classics. Archived from the original on 8 June 2011.
- Burgaleta, Pepe (28 December 2017). "Laverda 750 SFC, la naranja mecánica" [Laverda 750 SFC, the clockwork orange]. Motociclismo (in Spanish).
- Cloesen, Uli (15 August 2014). Italian Café Racers. Dorcester: Veloce Publishing Ltd. ISBN 978-1-84584-749-4.
- Garson, Paul (September 2005). "Lovin' the Laverda: Beauty Meets Brute Force in Breganze". Walneck's Classic Cycle Trader. pp. 129–133.
- Guyony, Philippe (20 September 2016). Vincent Motorcycles: The Untold Story since 1946. Poundbury, Dorchester, England: Veloce Publishing Ltd. ISBN 978-1-84584-902-3.
- Hill, Ray (March 1976). "Laverda 750SF Big Twin From Italy". Popular Science. Bonnier Corporation. p. 66.
- Hoseason, Rowena (19 November 2019). "Laverda 750 SF (1971) – Classic Review". Bennetts UK.
- Levenson, Corey Levenson (7 October 2011). "1974 Laverda 750 SFC". Motorcycle Classics.
- Lichter, Michael; d'Orleans, Paul (15 June 2014). Cafe Racers: Speed, Style, and Ton-Up Culture. Minneapolis, Minnesota: Motorbooks. ISBN 978-0-7603-4582-5.
- Minton, David (22 October 2012). "Road Test: Laverda SF750 part 1". Real Classic.
- Minton, David (13 March 2013). "Buying Guide: Laverda SF750 part 2". Real Classic.
- Olive, Jean-Louis (2007). Laverda die komplette Historie von 1949 bis 1989 (in German) (Dt. Ausg ed.). Königswinter: Heel. ISBN 978-3-89880-834-7.
- Saunders, Andy (August 1991). "The Short Flight of the American Eagle". American Motorcyclist. pp. 16–18.
- "Bald Eagles". Walneck's Classic Cycle Trader. November 2002. p. 180.
- "Motorcycles". Slater Laverda Motorcycles. Archived from the original on 8 February 2003.
