= Laverda 200 Bicilindrico =

Italian parallel twin motorcycle

- Manufacturer: Laverda
- Also called: Laverda Gemini
- Production: 1962-1976
- Class: Standard
- Engine: 199.5 cc (12.17 cu in) Air cooled ohv 4 stroke parallel twin
- Bore / stroke: 52 mm × 47 mm (2.0 in × 1.9 in)
- Compression ratio: 7.7:1
- Top speed: 115 km/h (71 mph)
- Power: 11 bhp (8.2 kW) @ 6,500 rpm
- Transmission: Gear primary, wet clutch, 5 speed, chain drive
- Suspension: Front: telescopic forks Rear: swinging arm, twin shock absorbers
- Brakes: 170 mm (6.7 in) Drums front & rear
- Tyres: 250x18 front, 300x17 rear
- Wheelbase: 1,280 mm (50 in)
- Weight: 120 kg (260 lb) (dry)
- Fuel capacity: 13 L (2.9 imp gal; 3.4 US gal)

The Laverda 200 Bicilindrico (200 Twin) is a 199.5 cc (12.17 cu in) air cooled ohv 4 stroke parallel twin motorcycle produced by the Italian manufacturer Laverda from 1962 to 1976. It was the company's first twin machine and the time of introduction it was Laverda's largest displacement model. Around 4,500 machines were produced, 2,000 of which were sold on the home market. Most of the remainder were exported to the UK and US as the 200 Gemini. The 14 year production run made it one of Laverda's longest running models.

== History ==
Laverda manufactured lightweight singles during the 1950s, their 75/100 cc model being one of the most commercially successful Italian motorcycles of the times with 38,000 sold. At the end of the 1950s legislation was introduced in Italy to prohibit motorcycles under 150 cc on motorways and Laverda started to lose ground to Gilera and Morini. In response, Laverda designed a scooter and the 200 twin.

Francesco Laverda had an admiration with Triumph motorcycles. This was reflected in the twin cylinder design, single downtube front part of the frame and rear bodywork reminiscent of Triumph's 'bathtub' 3TA and 5TA models. Most European motorcycles has the gearchange on the right, but with a view to the American market the gearchange was placed in the left on the Bicilindrico.

Intended as 'everyday' transport, the twin was first shown at the 1961 Milan Motorcycle Show and production started in 1962. The machine was available finished in light green, sky blue or orange.

A prototype of a sports version was produced in 1964 but this was never put into production. It was fitted with an all tubular frame and twin carburettors. It produced 15 bhp (11 kW) and was claimed to be capable of 140 km/h (87 mph).

Production continued until 1976 and several variants were produced, including one for the Italian Municipal Police.

== Technical details ==
=== Engine and transmission ===
The ohv twin was of unit construction. Lubrication was wet sump and oil was circulated by a plunger type oil pump that ran off the rear of the crankshaft. Ignition was initially by flywheel-magneto but later changed to coil and points with power supply from an alternator. Fuel was supplied by a 18 mm (0.71 in) Dell'Orto carburettor.

Gears took power to the single plate wet clutch and 4 speed gearbox. Final drive was by chain.

=== Cycle parts ===
The frame consisted of a tubular front part and pressed steel rear section. The engine was rubber-mounted to reduce vibrations. Front suspension was by forks and at the rear a swinging arm with twin shock absorbers. 170 mm (6.7 in) drum brakes were fitted front and rear.
