= American Motorcyclist =

- American Motorcyclist December 2009 issue cover
- Managing Editor: Jim Witters
- Categories: Motorcycling
- Frequency: Monthly
- Publisher: American Motorcyclist Association
- Total circulation: 202,000 (2011)
- Founded: 1947; 79 years ago
- Country: United States
- Based in: Pickerington, Ohio
- Language: English
- Website: americanmotorcyclist.com/american-motorcyclist-magazine-archive
- ISSN: 0277-9358

American Motorcyclist is an American magazine published monthly by the American Motorcyclist Association, covering issues of importance to its members, including legislation and regulations, touring, trail riding, motocross, enduros, road racing, cruisers and dirt track.

Since April 2013, the magazine has published a second version that focuses on off-highway riding and competition.

== Circulation ==
The magazine is sent free of charge to members of the American Motorcyclist Association, and the current issue is available to members free online. The magazine is not sold on news stands. Members can access a complete catalog of back issues in PDF format for free on their official website.

== Contributors ==
American Motorcyclist has many freelance contributors, including Tom Mehren, Davey Morgan, Jeff Kardas, Gabe Ets-Hokin, and Conrad Lim.
