= Laverda =

1873–2004 motorcycle brand manufacturer in Italy

Moto Laverda
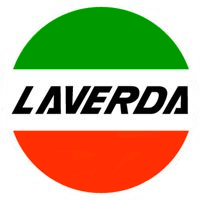
- Type: Subsidiary
- Founded: 1949; 77 years ago in Breganze
- Founder: Francesco Laverda
- Defunct: 2006
- Headquarters: Breganze, Italy
- Products: motorcycles
- Parent: Piaggio & Co. SpA
- Website: www.laverda.com

Laverda (Moto Laverda S.A.S. – Dottore Francesco Laverda e fratelli) was an Italian manufacturer of high performance motorcycles. The motorcycles in their day gained a reputation for being robust and innovative.

The Laverda brand was absorbed by Piaggio when, in 2004, Piaggio absorbed Aprilia. Piaggio has elected to quietly close all activities related to the Laverda brand and has publicly stated that they would be willing to sell the rights to the brand if an investor should appear. As of 2015, Laverda.com no longer redirects to Aprilia's website. As of 2021, laverda.com shows the history of the company between 1873 and 2004.

== History ==
=== Early history ===
The roots of the Laverda Motorcycle company go back to 1873, when Pietro Laverda (1845–1930) decided to start an agricultural engines enterprise – Laverda S.p.A. – in the small rural village of Breganze in Vicenza province (North-East of Italy).

Almost exactly three quarters of a century later, with a spirit of enterprise and feeling the need to improve the situation of an economically underdeveloped region which had suffered badly from two world wars, in October 1949, Pietro's grandson Francesco founded Moto Laverda S.A.S. – Dottore Francesco Laverda e fratelli.

Assisted by Luciano Zen, and after hours of running the normal agricultural business, Francesco had started in 1947 to design a small motorcycle. Word has it, that some engine parts were cast in Francesco's kitchen, confirming that at least initially, the project was not regarded as a serious business proposition. What most likely started as an evening pastime garage project of two technical enthusiasts was to become one of the most successful motorcycles in history. A simple four stroke 75 cc bike with girder forks and a fully enclosed drive chain.

The little bike showed promise, and so on October 13, 1949, the statutes of Moto Laverda were officially submitted to the Chamber of Commerce of Vicenza. Over the next several years, Laverda became well known for building small capacity machines of high quality, durability and relative innovation for the time. To prove this, right from the beginning they modified their bikes in order to race them in distance and endurance events like the Milan-Taranto, the Giro d'Italia and the Cavalcata delle Dolomiti. In 1951 upon their first entry in the Milan-Taranto, the 75 cc Laverdas finished 4th, 5th, 6th and 10th in their class, racing against renowned marques like Ducati, Moto Guzzi, Alpino, Verga, Cimatti, Navarra, Ardito, Capriolo and Ceccato. Inspired by these results, and after once again improving their bikes, Laverda entered 20 bikes the following year in the 15th running of the Milan-Taranto in 1952. In this race which covered a distance of 1410 km they took the first five places. The winner was Nino Castellani, L. Marchi came second and F. Diolio came third. In total they had 16 bikes amongst the first 20 of the classification. Laverda motorcycles thus became a firm favorite among racing clubmen due to their record for reliable performance.

Over the next two decades, Laverda would go on to produce new models of ever increasing capacity and capability, in different sectors of the market. Off-road, trial and motocross machines were developed in conjunction with other manufacturers like Zündapp, BMW and Husqvarna, and were successfully raced. But the real development came in street models, which began to earn a good reputation as classy, low maintenance and quiet motorcycles. From that first 75 cc single, they eventually went on to produce different bikes ranging from scooters, the Laverdino commuter and eventually to the 200 cc twin.

=== The big twins ===
By the late 1960s, Francesco and brothers began sketching out a new breed of large motorcycles that would be built around an all new 650 cc parallel twin engine. The brand was now well known, and Francesco's son Massimo had just returned from the USA where sales were dominated by large capacity British and American hardware suited for long-distance traveling. Above all this, was a desire to produce a machine that could conceivably take on Moto-Guzzi, BMW and the rapidly emerging Japanese.

In November 1966 Laverda exhibited the result of its thinking with the 650 prototype at Earls Court in London. While not an extreme sport bike in any sense, it exhibited all the virtues that Laverda had become synonymous with. At the same time its appearance disrupted the concept of a big bore parallel twin being British built. After this first appearance, Luciano Zen and Massimo Laverda retreated until April 1968, working hard in order to prepare the bike for production. By now they had developed a 750 cc version too. They were confident enough to enter four examples in the prestigious Giro d'Italia. Two 650 and two 750 machines provided Laverda with victory for the 650 in her class, with three bikes finishing in the first 6 and all in the top 10. Two weeks after this victory the first 650 cc production models left the factory. The bikes carried the finest components available at the time, from British Smiths instruments, Pankl con-rods, Ceriani suspension, Mondial pistons, to Bosch electrical parts and (revolutionary at the time) Japanese Nippon-Denso starter, thus eliminating the one problem plaguing nearly all contemporary British and Italian motorcycles at the time: their electrical unreliability. The 650 cc offered superior comfort and stability with its handling at least equivalent to the competition. Of course, it also carried a high price. It is difficult to quantify production quantities since frame numbering was shared with the 750 launched in May 1968 - as few as 52 or up to 200 Laverda 650 cc were produced.

=== 750 ===
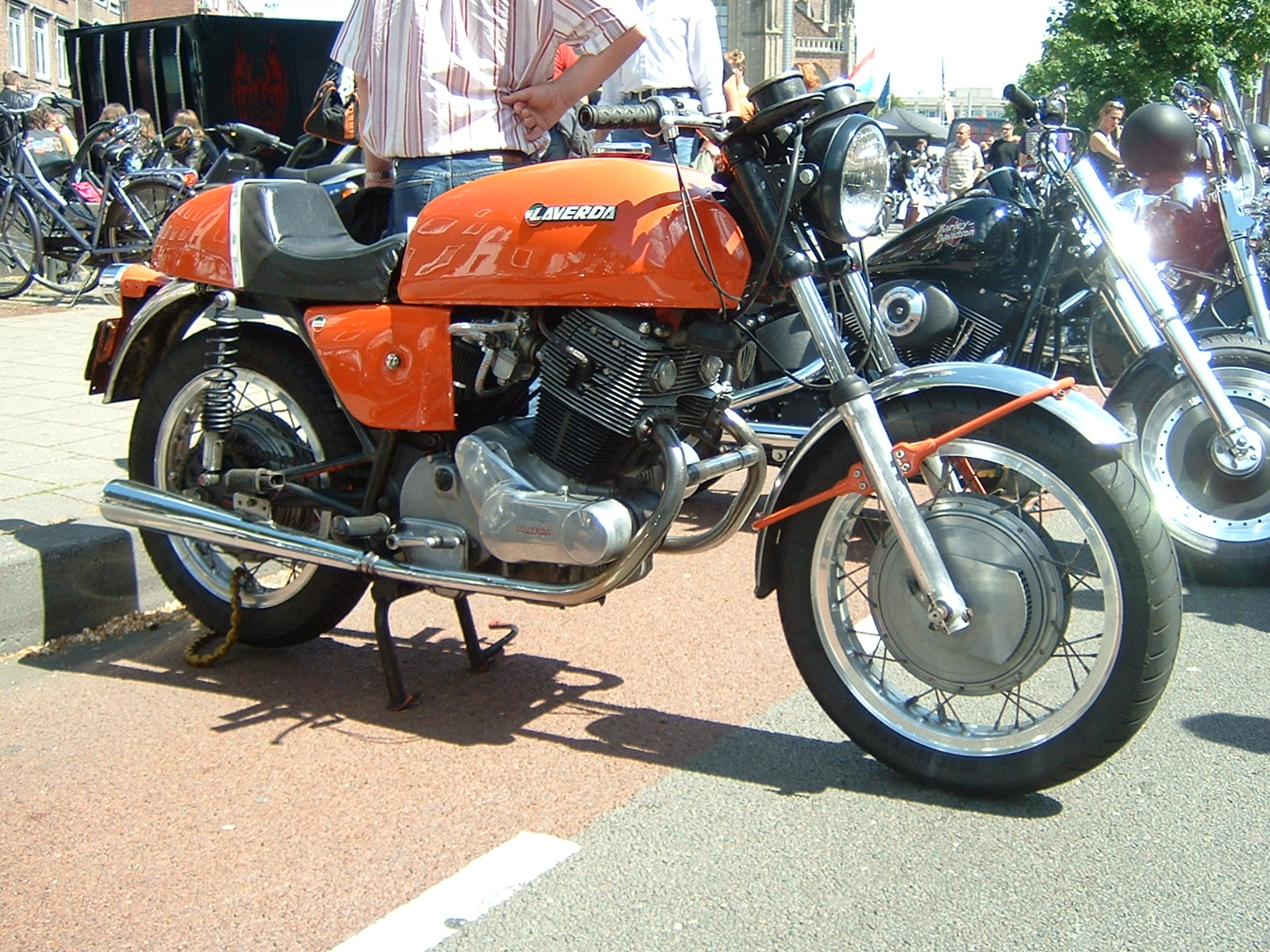
Laverda 750 SF (1972)

The true birth of Laverda as a serious big bike brand occurred with the introduction of 750 cc; its appearance halted sales of the recently introduced 650. Many of the first bikes were produced for the American market under the brand "American Eagle", which were imported to the US from 1968 until 1969 by Jack McCormack, and were used by stunt rider Evel Knievel until 1970. The 750 was identical to the 650 except for the lower compression and carburettor rejetting. In 1969 the "750 S" and the "750 GT" were born, both equipped with an engine which would truly start the Laverda fame. Both engine and frame were reworked: power was increased to 60 bhp (45 kW) for the S. 3 bikes were entered by the factory at the 1969 Dutch 24-hour endurance race in Oss, the 750S was clearly the fastest bike until piston failure left just one machine to finish fourth.

Just like the agricultural machinery made by Laverda S.p.A., the other family business, Laverdas were built to be indestructible. The parallel twin cylinder engine featured no less than five main bearings (four crankcase bearings and a needle-roller outrigger bearing in the primary chaincase cover), a duplex cam chain, and a starter motor easily twice as powerful as needed. Of course, this made the engine and subsequently the entire bike heavier than other bikes of the same vintage, such as the Ducati 750.

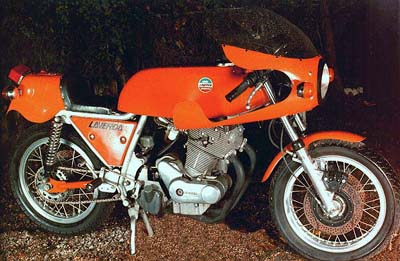
Laverda 750 SFC

The SF evolved to include disc brakes and cast alloy wheels. Developed from the 750S road bike was the 750 SFC (super freni competizione), a half-faired racer that was developed to win endurance events like the Oss 24 hours, Barcelona 24 hours and the Bol D'Or at Le Mans. This it did, often placed first, second and third in the same race, and dominating the international endurance race circuit in 1971. Distinguished by its characteristic orange paint which would become the company's race department colour, its smooth aerodynamic fairing and upswept exhaust, the SFC was Laverda's flagship product and best advertisement, flaunting pedigree and the message of durability, quality, and exclusivity. The SFC "Series 15,000" was featured in the Guggenheim Museum in New York's 1999 exhibit The Art of the Motorcycle as one of the most iconic bikes of the 1970s.

=== Triples ===
By the late 1960s, Laverda was facing increasing competition from the Japanese. While launching their new 750 cc (46 cu in) model range in 1968, the company turned its attention to a new three-cylinder powerplant, which was first shown as a prototype at the Milan and Geneva shows in 1969. The 1,000 cc (61 cu in) prototype was essentially a 750 twin with an additional cylinder. After extensive testing, modifications, and mechanical engineering, the company finally unveiled the new liter-class, three-cylinder bike in competition at the Zeltweg race in Austria. The bike that went into production shortly later in 1972 was recognisable as a motorcycle of the modern era, but it was still configured in a conservative layout, sharing some of the features of the earlier SF/SFC models, such as the high-quality alloy castings and distinctive styling. The 981 cc triple provided more power than the outgoing twins, with not much more weight. The 1973–1981 Laverda 1000 3C Triple model that made 85 hp (63 kW) @ 7,250rpm and reaching speeds of more than 130 mph (210 km/h).

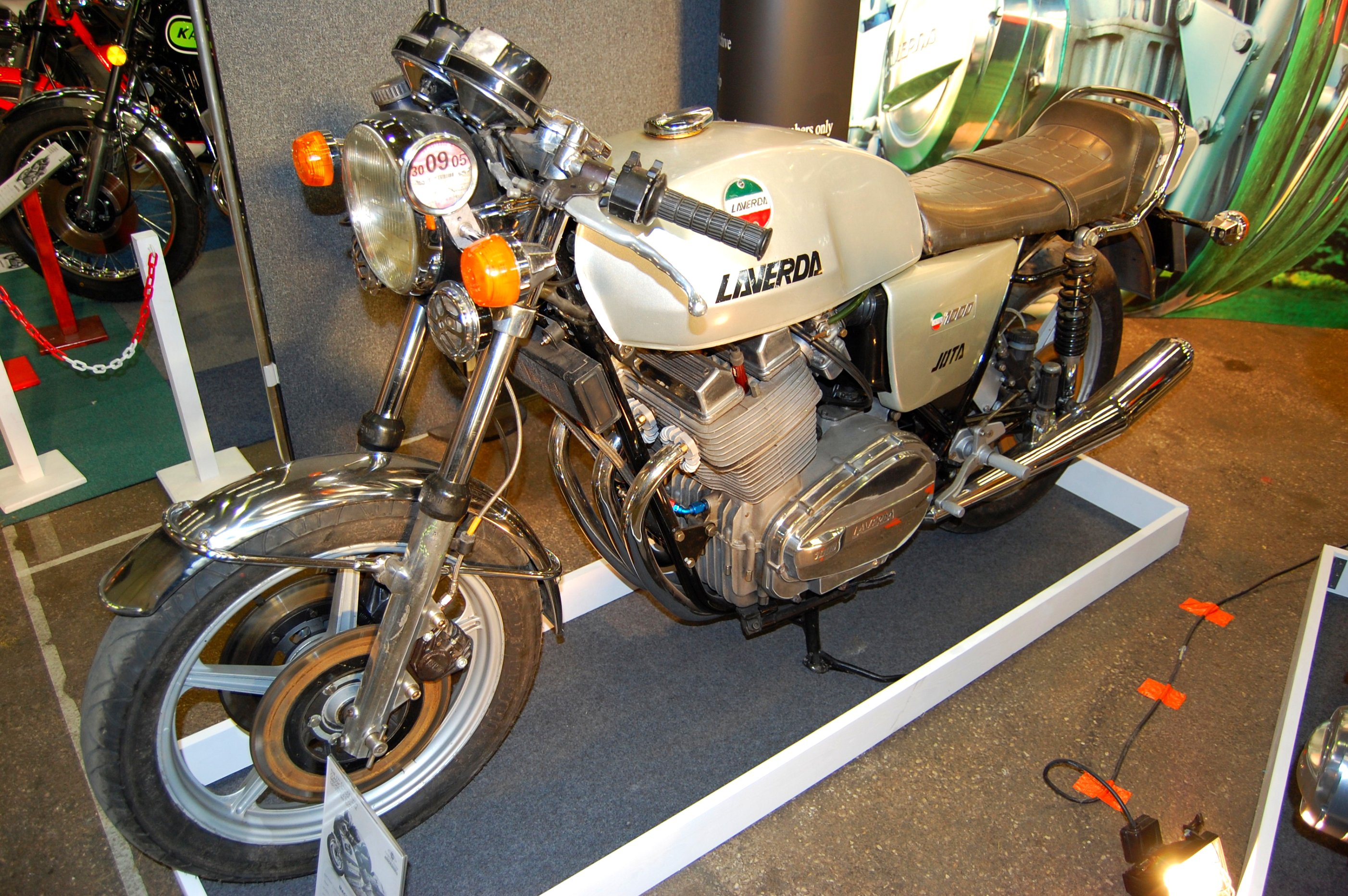
LAVERDA JOTA 1000cc. ITALY 1976-1982

The new Laverda Jota based on the 3C made a big impression in 1976 producing 90 hp (67 kW) and reaching speeds of 146 mph (235 km/h), thanks to the factory racing parts fitted into the road engine directly at the factory, it was the fastest production motorcycle to date. British importer Roger Slater worked with the factory to develop a high-performance version of the bike, the Jota. Laverda three-cylinder engines up to 1982 featured a 180-degree crankshaft arrangement, in which the center piston is at the top of its stroke when the two outer pistons are at the bottom. This purposefully out-of-phase design gave the 1,000 cc Laverdas a distinctive character. The engine evolved into a smoother, rubber mounted 120 degree configuration in 1982.

The three cylinder 1978–1979 Laverda 1200 TS Mirage was one of the largest displacements ever to be fitted on a machine from Laverda. The1,115 cc (68.0 cu in) produced 73 hp (54 kW) and 40 lb⋅ft (54 N⋅m) and a weight of 545 lb (247 kg).

=== V6 ===
In 1977, Laverda unveiled a V6 at the Milan Show, and went on to enter it in the 24-hour Bol d'Or race held at the Paul Ricard circuit in France. While notching an impressive straight-away speed of 175.46 mph (282.38 km/h) during a practice run, its performance in the race was hindered by a bulky build and it did not finish the race. Laverda planned on re-entering the V6 in the 1979 race but rule changes limited Endurance racers to four cylinders and the V6 project was officially ended.

=== Middleweight twins ===
Laverda launched a smaller 500 cc twin cylinder eight-valve entry-level machine named the Alpina in 1977 (quickly renamed Alpino due to trademark infringement and Zeta in the USA). It came with a six-speed gearbox and balance shaft. A 350 cc version of the Alpino was also available from November 1977 – primarily designed for the home Italian market where a high tax was payable for machines over 350 cc. This was followed by the improved Alpino S and Formula 500 racer in 1978, to support a single model race series. Its import into the UK led Roger Slater to develop the Montjuic in 1979 which was a road legal F500 with lights, sidestand & instruments. It evolved into the mk2 in 1981. EEC noise restrictions saw its demise by 1983. Tellingly, Massimo Laverda said that each Alpino sold lost the factory money.

Then somewhere in the mid eighties an enduro frame was built with 500 cc engine, which was followed by the Atlas series with 570 cc engine and improved oil cooling.

=== Beginning of the end ===
By the 1980s, the European motorcycle industry as a whole was reeling from Japanese competition, causing many companies like NVT (the amalgamated surviving British companies Norton, Triumph, and BSA), Moto-Guzzi, and many others to struggle or disappear completely. Laverda attempted to update their product line by introducing the RGS sports tourer in 1983, with features such unbreakable Bayflex plastic mouldings; fuel filler in the fairing; integrated but removable luggage (Executive version), and adjustable footpeg position. In 1985, came the SFC 1000 sports model – a badge engineered attempt based on the RGS to reprise the hallowed SFC name.

Underneath the new skin were engines and technologies that were ten years out of date and overpriced when compared to the lighter, faster, cheaper and more advanced Japanese bikes. As an example, in 1983 the Montjuic mk2 cost the same as the four-cylinder, 100 bhp (75 kW) Kawasaki Z1000J. On the race tracks too, the Japanese bikes dominated.

Flirtations with a highly complex aluminum framed, 350 cc three-cylinder two-stroke and the unsuccessful V6 endurance racer consumed resources that the small factory could not afford. Combined with this, the motorcycle industry in general was in trouble as sales dropped. In these conditions, the Laverda family bowed out by 1985.

=== Takeovers and rebirth ===
Initiatives to save Laverda, included a Japanese investment company who wanted to sell apparel and other merchandise under the name; to a local government initiative which tried to run the factory as a co-operative; but each of these failed.

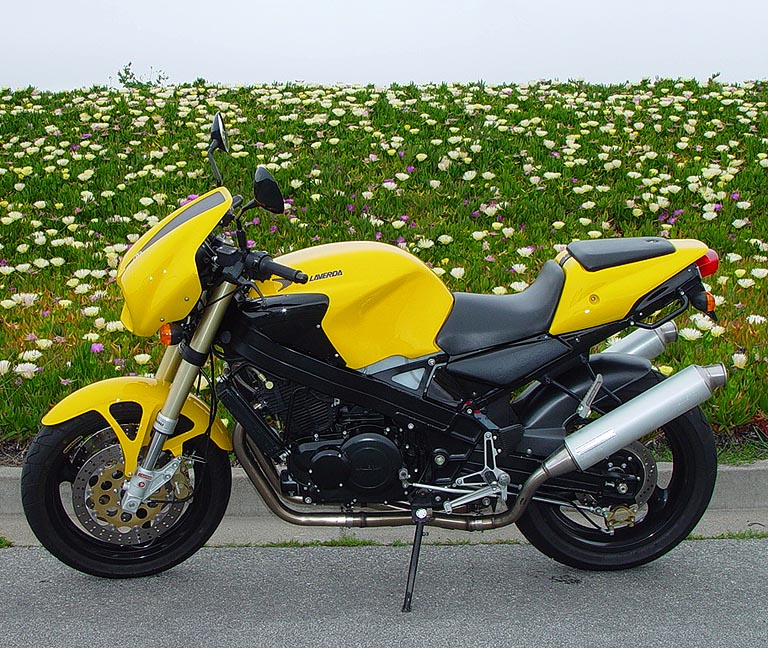
1998 Laverda Ghost Strike

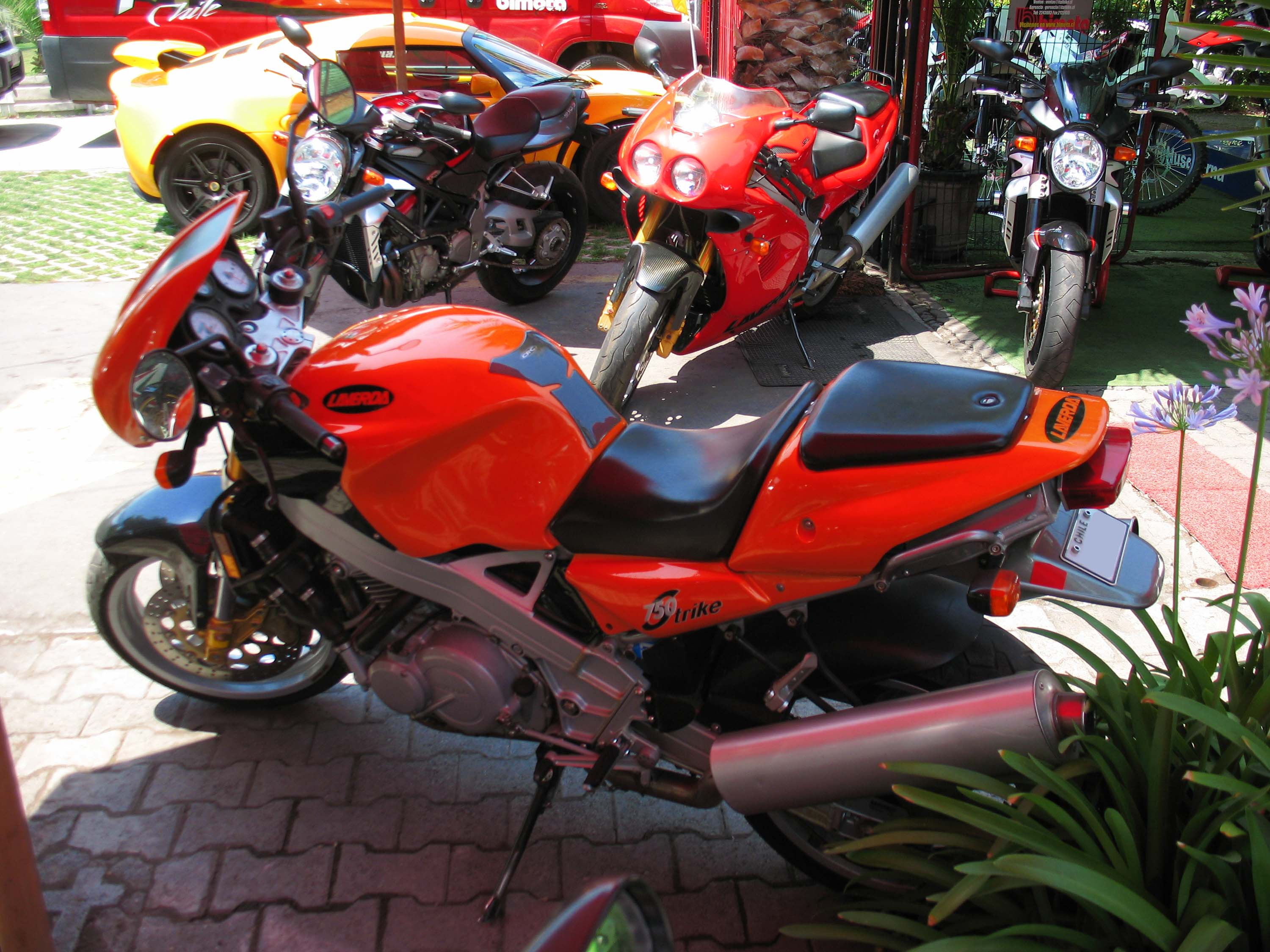
1997 Laverda 750 Strike

In 1993, millionaire Francesco Tognon bought everything, thus saving the company and setting up what looked like the first serious attempt in a decade to relaunch the brand. Over the next five years, they launched a small selection of new sports models based on a thorough redo of the DOHC 650 cc parallel-twin derived from the old Alpino, upped to 668 cc and clothed in contemporary superbike livery. These bikes were outfitted with Weber-Marelli electronic fuel injection, Brembo Gold Line brakes, fully adjustable Paioli suspension (White Power on some models), hollow spoke Marchesini wheels and a modern beam or trellis frame. Within a year and a half, a larger, water cooled 750 appeared with a new engine in an aluminum beam chassis developed by frame specialist Nico Bakker.

At successive international motorcycle shows, Laverda displayed mockups of new models they were planning to build, including an all new, 900 cc liquid-cooled three-cylinder engine; The 750 roadster variants Ghost and Strike; the Lynx, a small, naked roadster with a Suzuki 650 cc V-twin engine; and finally the 800TTS trail/enduro, which aimed to take on the likes of the Cagiva Gran Canyon and Honda Transalp. The venture failed after five years.

=== Aprilia takeover ===
Along with historical rival Moto Guzzi, the Laverda motorcycle brand was purchased by Aprilia S.p.A. (another Italian motorcycle manufacturer based in the same region) in 2000, restructured and incorporated into the Aprilia Group. Several projects that had been in development and the existing two motorcycles in production, were cancelled. Aprilia founded a new Laverda division business unit which shortly after began importing low cost Asian scooters and quads and selling them under the Laverda brand name.

In 2003, Laverda presented a new SFC prototype, based on a heavily revised Aprilia RSV 1000 at the Milan EICMA motorcycle show. While stunning in many aspects, in particular the attention to component and mechanical detailing, it did not generate enough positive interest to merit further development.

In 2004, the Aprilia Group was acquired by Piaggio, the giant scooter manufacturer of Vespa fame. Piaggio elected to close all activities related to the Laverda brand, and has publicly stated that they would be willing to sell the rights to the brand if an investor should appear. Today, the brand is no longer in use.

== See also ==
- Laverda (harvesters)
- List of Italian companies
- List of motorcycle manufacturers
- List of Laverda Motorcycles
