= Motorcycle Classics =

American magazine

- Editor-in-chief: Richard Backus
- Categories: Motorcycling
- Frequency: Monthly
- Publisher: Ogden Publications, Inc
- First issue: 2005; 21 years ago
- Country: USA
- Based in: Topeka
- Language: English
- Website: www.motorcycleclassics.com
- ISSN: 1556-0880

Motorcycle Classics is a motorcycling magazine in the United States. They are a motorcycle magazine publication specializing in classic motorcycles 25 years old and beyond.
