= DeWeese =

DeWeese is a surname. Notable people with the surname include:

- Bill DeWeese (born 1950), American politician
- Bob DeWeese (artist) (1920-1990), American painter
- Bob DeWeese (politician) (1934-2020), American politician
- Bob DeWeese (basketball) (1915–1991), American basketball player
- Devin Deweese (1835–1906), American historian
- Ebby DeWeese (1904–1942), American football player
- Gene DeWeese (1934–2012), American writer
- Gennie DeWeese (1921–2007), American painter
- John T. Deweese (1835–1906), American politician
- Mary Ann DeWeese (1913–1993), American designer
- Theodore DeWeese, American radiation oncologist and academic administrator

== See also ==
- Deweese, Nebraska
- DeWeese Reservoir
