= Pirsig =

Pirsig is a surname. Notable people with the surname include:

- Detlef Pirsig (1945–2019), German football player
- Maynard Pirsig (1902–1997), American legal scholar and academic
- Robert M. Pirsig (1928–2017), Maynard's son, American writer and philosopher
