= Bob DeWeese =

Bob DeWeese may refer to:

- Bob DeWeese (politician) (1934–2020), American politician and physician
- Bob DeWeese (artist) (1920–1990), Modernist artist in Montana
- Bob DeWeese (basketball) (1915–1991), American professional basketball player
