= Maynard Pirsig =

American judge (1902–1997)

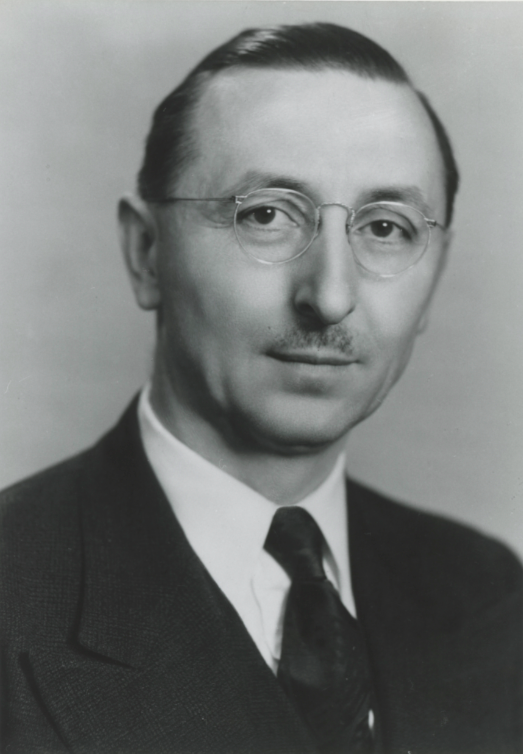

Minnesota Supreme Court

Personal details
- Born: January 9, 1902
- Died: February 7, 1997 (aged 95)
- Spouse: Harriet Sjobeck (m. 1925)
- Education: University of Minnesota (Bachelor); University of Minnesota Law School (LLB)

Maynard E. Pirsig, LLD, (/ˈpɜːrsɪɡ/; January 9, 1902 - February 7, 1997) was an American legal scholar. He was a professor, and dean, of the University of Minnesota Law School; a Minnesota Supreme Court justice; director of the Minnesota Legal Aid Society, and an advisor for the Indonesian, Puerto Rican, and El Salvadoran legal systems. He defined Legal Ethics in the 1974 Encyclopedia Britannica. His law books were widely used in schools across the country, including his casebook Judicial Administration—which Pirsig used for the United States' first law reform course, early 1930s. He was mentored by Everett Fraser, Roscoe Pound, and Felix Frankfurter.

Pirsig wrote in his book, Cases and Materials on Legal Ethics, 1949, "The lawyer's duty is of a double character. He owes to his client the duty of fidelity, but he also owes the duty of good faith and honorable dealing to judicial tribunals before whom he practices his profession. He is an officer of the court--a minister in the temple of justice." Pirsig, supported civil rights, the Equal Rights Amendment, abolishment of the death penalty ("an imperfect system should not be lethal"), Planned Parenthood, abortion rights, a separate juvenile court system, rehabilitation programs for prison inmates, and fair access to the law regardless of income.

Robert A. Stein, former dean of U Minnesota Law School, described Pirsig as "an unpretentious man concerned about the welfare of others".

Maynard E. Pirsig's son, Robert M. Pirsig, authored Zen and the Art of Motorcycle Maintenance, and Lila.

== Early life, family and education ==
Pirsig was born in 1902 in Kossuth County, Iowa, near Elmore, Minnesota, to Gustav and Amelia Pirsig, Prussian immigrants. He was raised on his parents' farm, with his four siblings, speaking only German until he began attending school. Pirsig earned a bachelor's degree in 1923 from the University of Minnesota, and an LL.B degree in 1925 from the University of Minnesota Law School.

== Career ==
=== University of Minnesota Law School ===
Pirsig joined the university's Law School faculty 1929. Soon, under the guidance by Dean Everett Fraser, he attended graduate courses in law at Harvard University from 1931 to 1932, studying under Roscoe Pound and Felix Frankfurter. During 1932–1933, on a University of Minnesota Law School scholarship, as preparation for developing a course in judicial administration, Pirsig spent one year in England with his wife Harriet and son Robert, studying at the Middle Temple. Upon returning to the University of Minnesota Law School, Pirsig began teaching his new course in judicial administration in 1934. A course that strove to encompass all subjects—from justice and precedence, to trial techniques and the organization of the courts—pertinent to developing well rounded lawyers. Pirsig's research and teaching led to the publication of a book in 1946, Cases and Materials on Judicial Administration, which he taught throughout his career. Judicial Administration gave birth to a new subject in the field of law. Charles W. Wolfram described Pirsig's teaching as aiming to produce "students... equipped with a challenging attitude, a reformer's zeal for ideal solutions, and a full arsenal of possibilities for innovations (who) would continue to confront the judicial system with challenges to ever more humane conduct that alone will guarantee its continuing legitimacy". George K. Gardner said of the book: "Here are a thousand pages on the purpose and problems of our profession which will repay thoughtful study by any student, teacher, or practitioner of the law." Pirsig also taught courses on pleading, ethics and criminal law.

When Pirsig was Dean of the Law School (1948–1955), he recruited ten new faculty members. Most were, or became, pillars in the world of legal scholarship, including Charles Alan Wright, Michael I. Sovern, David Louisell, Jesse Dukeminier, and librarian Leon Liddell. Pirsig managed an expansion of the school, including the library. He developed a training program at the law school, for professionals in juvenile delinquency control which trained police and judges on how to utilize the American Juvenile Justice System - a system Pirsig had been instrumental in introducing to the state. He managed a difficult period of post-war transition and growth at the University of Minnesota Law School, however, according to Robert A. Stein, "traditions of excellence were maintained and the foundation was laid for more productive future years". Pirsig resigned his position as Dean in 1955, and returned to teaching full-time. While Dean of the University of Minnesota Law School, Pirsig publicly urged the university to expel fraternities and sororities that had racial "bias clauses" in their charters or constitutions, 1957.

He retired from the University of Minnesota Law School due to its mandatory retirement age, then 68.

=== Mitchell Hamline School of Law ===
After his mandatory retirement from University of Minnesota Law School due to age, Mitchell Hamline School of Law immediately hired Pirsig to their faculty. Then 68, Pirsig requested that he not be tenured, so he could be easily released from his position if required—he taught until age 91. Here, he taught Criminal Law, Criminal Procedure, Professional Responsibility, and Comparative Judicial Administration.

Drawing from his early experience in London, Pirsig helped to develop and teach Comparative Judicial Administration for William Mitchell College of Law's (now Mitchell Hamline School of Law) "Summer in London" program, with Professor Robert E. Oliphant and Professor Eric S. Janus of William Mitchell. Maynard taught the course in London and Saint Paul, from 1988 through 1991. The course was taught with Michael Zander in London at Regent's University.

Maynard Pirsig and Randall Tietjen co-authored the article Court Procedure and the Separation of Powers in Minnesota, published in Vol. 15 of the William Mitchell Law Review in 1989.

Mitchell Hamline bestowed an honorary L.L.D. doctorate degree upon Pirsig, 1981.

Pirsig made a donation for the construction of the Warren E. Burger Law Library, housing the Maynard E. Pirsig Study Hall, which contains a vitrine displaying his legal and personal memorabilia—including his 1946 U of M lectures recorded onto SoundScriber vinyl discs.

=== Minnesota Supreme Court ===
At age 40, Pirsig served as an interim justice on the Minnesota Supreme Court. He was appointed by Governor Harold Stassen. Pirsig served for only a few months, but wrote more than a dozen opinions, several of which later became important legal precedents.

A summary of opinions written by Maynard E. Pirsig can be seen at Minnesota's website.

== Selected achievements ==
- Executive Director of the Mid-Minnesota Legal Aid Society. 1925–30
- Secretary of the Minnesota Judicial Council, which studied the organization and procedures of the courts. 1937–52
- Chairman, Minnesota State Bar Association committee to study the American Law Institute's Youth Conservation Act 1943
- Chairman of the Advisory Committee of the Minnesota Division of Employment and Security, 1945–56, responsible for the development and administration of Minnesota's employment security program
- Member, National Conference of Commissioners on Uniform State Law. His 30-year tenure (1947–77) as a member of the conference included service in many capacities, such as chairman of committees for uniform acts in arbitration, expunging criminal records, juvenile court, and rules of criminal procedure.
- Member of the Advisory Committee on the Federal Rules of Civil Procedure, 1951–57
- Chairman, Juvenile Court Committee, 1953–58
- Member, US Department of Labor's Industry Committee for Puerto Rico. Beginning in 1955, later chairman for four years.
- Reporter for the special legislative advisory committee created to prepare a revision of the Minnesota Criminal Code. 1957
- Member, US Advisory Committee on the Federal Rules of Criminal Procedure, 1960–70
- Reviewed and Advised on the Indonesian judicial system for their government, during a three-month visit with James F. Hogg, 1968
- Consultant to the Minnesota Supreme Court's Committee on Rules of Criminal Procedure. 1971–90
- Defined Legal Ethics, Encyclopedia Britannica. 1974
- Member, Minnesota Supreme Court's Commission on Juvenile Courts. 1976
- Lectured on judicial administration to the Supreme Court of El Salvador. 1991

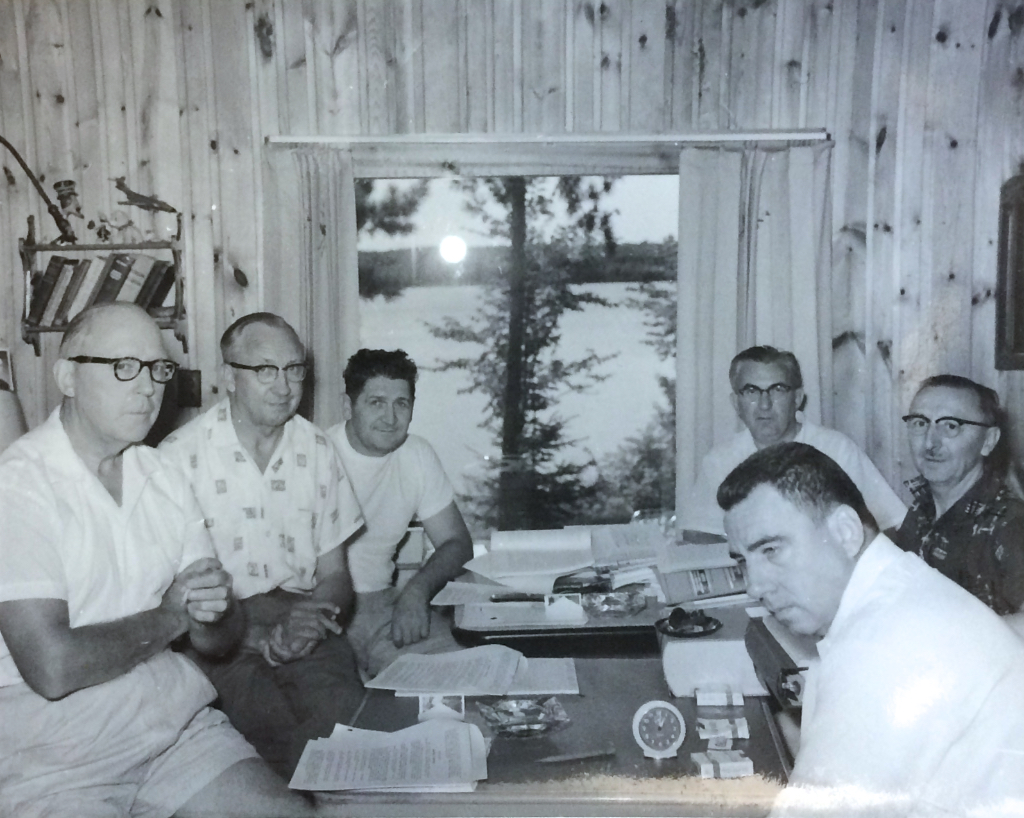
Meeting on Lake Lougee, MN, 1957, of a special legislative advisory committee created to prepare a revision of the Minnesota criminal code. Pictured, Left to Right, William P. Murphy(?), Oscar Knutson, Harold Schultz, Joseph Bright, Maynard Pirsig, Bruce Stone (?). Photo courtesy of Mitchell Hamline School of Law, Warren E. Burger Library

== Publications ==
Maynard E. Pirsig was a prolific writer. Many of his publications were about how to improve the judicial system. A list of his publications can be seen at this link: click here

== Awards and honors ==
- University of Minnesota Outstanding Achievement Award, 1985.
- University of Minnesota's Mondale Hall houses the Maynard E. Pirsig Lecture Hall, which includes an oil painting of Maynard.
- Maynard Pirsig Moot Court is named for him.
- Herbert Lincoln Harley Award from the American Judicature Society, for outstanding contributions to the improvement of the administration of justice, 1973.
- Honorary doctorate degree (LLD) from William Mitchell College of Law, 1981
- Outstanding Achievement Award, University of Minnesota Law School, 1985. At the time, the only father and son (Robert M. Pirsig, awarded 1975) conferred with individual awards.
- William Mitchell College of Law establishes the Pirsig Distinguished Lecturer Series, 1987
- Whitney North Seymour Award

== Events of interest ==
Pirsig helped draft a bill to revise the Minnesota State Criminal Code. Although some officials believed that it was too lenient and hampered law enforcement, it was passed in 1965.

== Personal life ==
Following a courtship of several years, he married Harriet Sjobeck June 1, 1926. They raised three children, Robert, Jean and Wanda.

Pirsig's will contained a gift to University of Minnesota Law School, to teach his Judicial Administration course again. It was revived and taught again c. 2001–04.

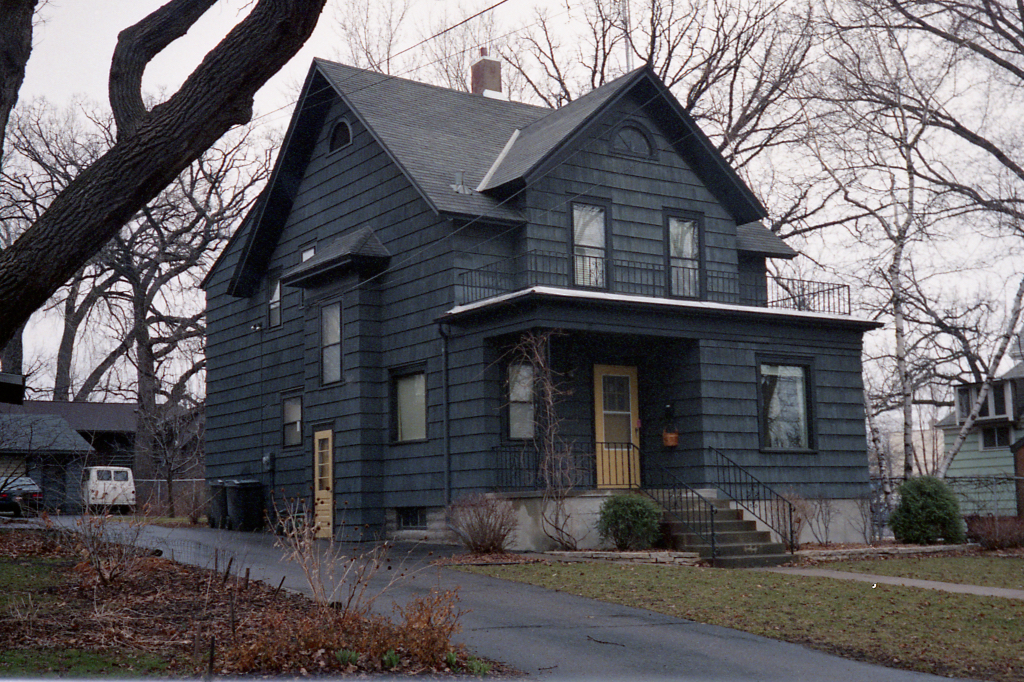
Minneapolis home, 1932–1995. Here. Maynard and Harriet Sjobeck Pirsig lived and raised their three children, Robert, Jean, and Wanda.
