= Pirsig's Metaphysics of Quality =

Theory of reality

The Metaphysics of Quality (MoQ) is a theory of reality introduced in Robert M. Pirsig's philosophical novel Zen and the Art of Motorcycle Maintenance (1974) and Lila: An Inquiry into Morals (1991). The MOQ is an integration and expansion of Logical Positivism, Sophistry, American Pragmatism, Indigenous American philosophy and Sōtō Zen. Framework has ben inspired by the work of F. S. C. Northrop's notion of Undifferentiated Aesthetic Continuum. Pirsig argues that the MoQ is a better lens through which to view reality than the subjective/objective mindset that Pirsig attributes to Aristotle. Zen and the Art of Motorcycle Maintenance references the Sanskrit doctrine of Tat Tvam Asi ("Thou art that"), which asserts an existential monism as opposed to the subject–object dualism, though he later clarified that segregation of metaphysical systems as "monism, dualism and pluralism, seems to me to be an arbitrary classification where none is needed. The Metaphysics of Quality is all three: Quality is the monism. Static Quality and Dynamic Quality are the dualism, and the four levels of static quality contain a pluralism of things."

== Development ==
The Metaphysics of Quality originated with Pirsig's college studies as a biochemistry student at the University of Minnesota. He describes in Zen and the Art of Motorcycle Maintenance that as he studied, he found the number of rational hypotheses for any given phenomenon appeared to be unlimited. It seemed to him this would seriously undermine the validity of the scientific method. His studies began to suffer as he pondered the question and eventually he was expelled from the university.

After spending some time in Korea as a soldier, Pirsig concluded that Oriental philosophy was a better place to search for answers. On his return home from Korea, Pirsig read F. S. C. Northrop's book The Meeting of East and West which related Western culture to the culture of East Asia in a systematic way. In 1950, Pirsig continued his philosophical studies at Banaras Hindu University, where he came across the Sanskrit doctrine of Tat Tvam Asi — in his words, "Thou art that, which asserts that everything you think you are (Subjective), and everything you think you perceive (Objective), are undivided. To fully realize this lack of division is to become enlightened." The nature of mystical experience plays an underlying role throughout his work.

In the late 1950s and early 1960s, Pirsig taught rhetoric at Montana State College – Bozeman and, with the encouragement of an older colleague, Sarah Vinke, decided to explore what exactly was meant by the term Quality. He assigned his students the task of defining the word. This, coupled with a Native American Church peyote ceremony he attended with an anthropologist friend, James Verne Dusenberry, led Pirsig into what he called an "enormous symmetrical intellectual web" Pirsig began developing his ideas about Quality in his first book, Zen and the Art of Motorcycle Maintenance, and expanded and codified his ideas into the MoQ in Lila.

== Quality ==
"Dynamic Quality cannot be defined. It can only be understood intellectually through the use of analogy."

— Dan Glover, Lila's Child: An Inquiry Into Quality

"Quality," or "Value," as described by Pirsig, is left undefined because it empirically precedes any intellectual construction of it, namely due to the fact that Quality (as Pirsig explicitly places it) exists always as a perceptual experience before it is ever thought of descriptively or academically. Quality is the "knife-edge" of experience, found only in the present, known or at least potentially accessible to all of "us" (cf. Plato's Phaedrus, 258d). Equating it with the Tao, Pirsig postulates that Quality is the fundamental force in the universe stimulating everything from atoms to animals to evolve and incorporate ever greater levels of complexity. According to the MOQ, everything (including ideas, and matter) is a product and a result of Quality.

=== Dynamic Quality and Static Quality Patterns ===
In Robert M. Pirsig's Metaphysics of Quality (MoQ), Quality, used synonimus with Value, is proposed as the fundamental reality, prior to the conceptual distinction between subjects and objects. Pirsig distinguishes between Dynamic Quality, the undefinable and immediately experienced aspect of reality, and static patterns of quality, the relatively stable and identifiable forms through which experience becomes ordered and intelligible. Dynamic Quality is described as the pre-intellectual source of novelty and change, whereas static patterns preserve the results of previous developments and provide continuity. Pirsig argues that both are necessary: without Dynamic Quality, existing patterns cannot develop; without static patterns, new developments cannot endure.

Pirsig classifies static patterns of quality into four evolutionary levels: inorganic, biological, social, and intellectual. These levels are distinct but interdependent. Each higher level emerges from and depends upon lower levels, while possessing patterns and forms of organization that cannot be fully explained in terms of those below it. In this framework, subjects and objects are understood as derivative conceptual distinctions rather than the fundamental constituents of reality. The MoQ thus seeks to describe both physical and mental phenomena within a single value-based metaphysical framework.

==== Dynamic Quality ====
In Pirsig's Metaphysics of Quality, Dynamic Quality refers to the immediate, undefinable aspect of Quality that precedes conceptual distinctions and established patterns of experience. Pirsig characterizes it as the “pre-intellectual cutting edge of reality,” arguing that value is encountered directly before it is interpreted through language, memory, or intellectual categories. Dynamic Quality is associated with freedom, novelty, and the emergence of new patterns, but cannot itself be reduced to any fixed description. In Lila, Pirsig illustrates this distinction through the experience of hearing an unfamiliar piece of music that produces an immediate sense of excellence. The initial response exemplifies Dynamic Quality, whereas the more enduring judgment that the music is good, even after its novelty has faded, exemplifies static quality. Pirsig also associates the direct apprehension of Dynamic Quality with mystical traditions, particularly Zen Buddhism, in which established conceptual distinctions are understood as potential obstacles to immediate experience.

==== Static patterns of quality ====
Dynamic quality can be described as the force of change in the universe. Conversely, static quality refers to any repeated arrangement that lasts long enough to be noticed within the flux of immediate experience. Pirsig defines "static quality" patterns as everything which can be defined. Everything found in a dictionary, for instance, is a static quality pattern. Pirsig then divides static quality into inorganic, biological, social, and intellectual patterns, in ascending order of morality (based on evolutionary order). These static forms, if they have enough "high" or "low" quality, are given names and are interchanged with other "sentient beings", building the base of knowledge for a culture.

- Inorganic patterns: non-living things
- Biological patterns: living things
- Social patterns: behaviors, habits, rituals, institutions.
- Intellectual patterns: ideas

Pirsig describes evolution as the moral progression of these patterns of value. For example, a biological pattern overcoming an inorganic pattern (e.g. bird flight which overcomes gravity) is a moral thing because a biological pattern is a higher form of evolution. Likewise, an intellectual pattern of value overcoming a social one (e.g. civil rights) is a moral development because intellect is a higher form of evolution than society. Therefore, decisions about one's conduct during any given day can be made using the Metaphysics of Quality. Pirsig is not proposing criticism or responsibility, but acceptance, and pure absorption:

"When he wrote it he felt momentary fright and was about to strike out the words 'All of it. Every last bit of it.' Madness there. I think he saw it. But he couldn’t see any logical reason to strike these words out and it was too late now for faintheartedness. He ignored his warning and let the words stand."-ZMM, Ch.20

"Good is a noun. That was it. That was what Phaedrus had been looking for. That was the homer, over the fence, that ended the ball game. Good as a noun rather than as an adjective is all the Metaphysics of Quality is about. Of course, the ultimate Quality isn't a noun or an adjective or anything else definable, but if you had to reduce the whole Metaphysics of Quality to a single sentence, that would be it."-Lila, The End

"The language we've inherited confuses this. We say 'my' body and 'your' body and 'his' body and 'her' body, but it isn't that way. … This Cartesian 'Me,' this autonomous little homunculus who sits behind our eyeballs looking out through them in order to pass judgment on the affairs of the world, is just completely ridiculous. This self-appointed little editor of reality is just an impossible fiction that collapses the moment one examines it."-ZMM, Ch.15

"Another immoral way of killing the static patterns is to pass the patterns to someone else, in what Phaedrus called a 'karma dump.' ... If you take all this karmic garbage and make yourself feel better by passing it on to others that's normal. That's the way the world works. But if you manage to absorb it and not pass it on, that's the highest moral conduct of all."-Lila, Ch.32

== Influence ==
Patrick Doorly was influenced by Pirsig's Quality when writing his 2013 book The Truth About Art: Reclaiming Quality. The book examines how society values art.

== See also ==
- Alfred North Whitehead and process philosophy
- C. S. Lewis (esp. The Abolition of Man)
- Charles Sanders Peirce
- Energy quality
- Flow (psychology)
- John Dewey
- Platonism, Plato
- Pragmatism
- Taoism, Tao
- William James
- William Kingdon Clifford's mindstuff and tribal self

== Sources ==
- Zen and the Art of Motorcycle Maintenance: An Inquiry into Values (1974) ISBN 0-06-095832-4
- Lila: An Inquiry into Morals (1991) ISBN 0-553-29961-1
- Guidebook to Zen and the Art of Motorcycle Maintenance by R. DiSanto and T. J. Steele (1990) ISBN 0-688-06069-2
- "Lila's Child: An Inquiry into Quality (2002) OCLC 59259846
- Granger, David A.: John Dewey, Robert Pirsig, and the Art of Living: Revisioning Aesthetic Education. New York: Palgrave Macmillan, 2006.
- The Truth About Art: Reclaiming Quality by Patrick Doorly (2013) ISBN 978-1780998411
