= Honda Super Hawk =

Honda CB77
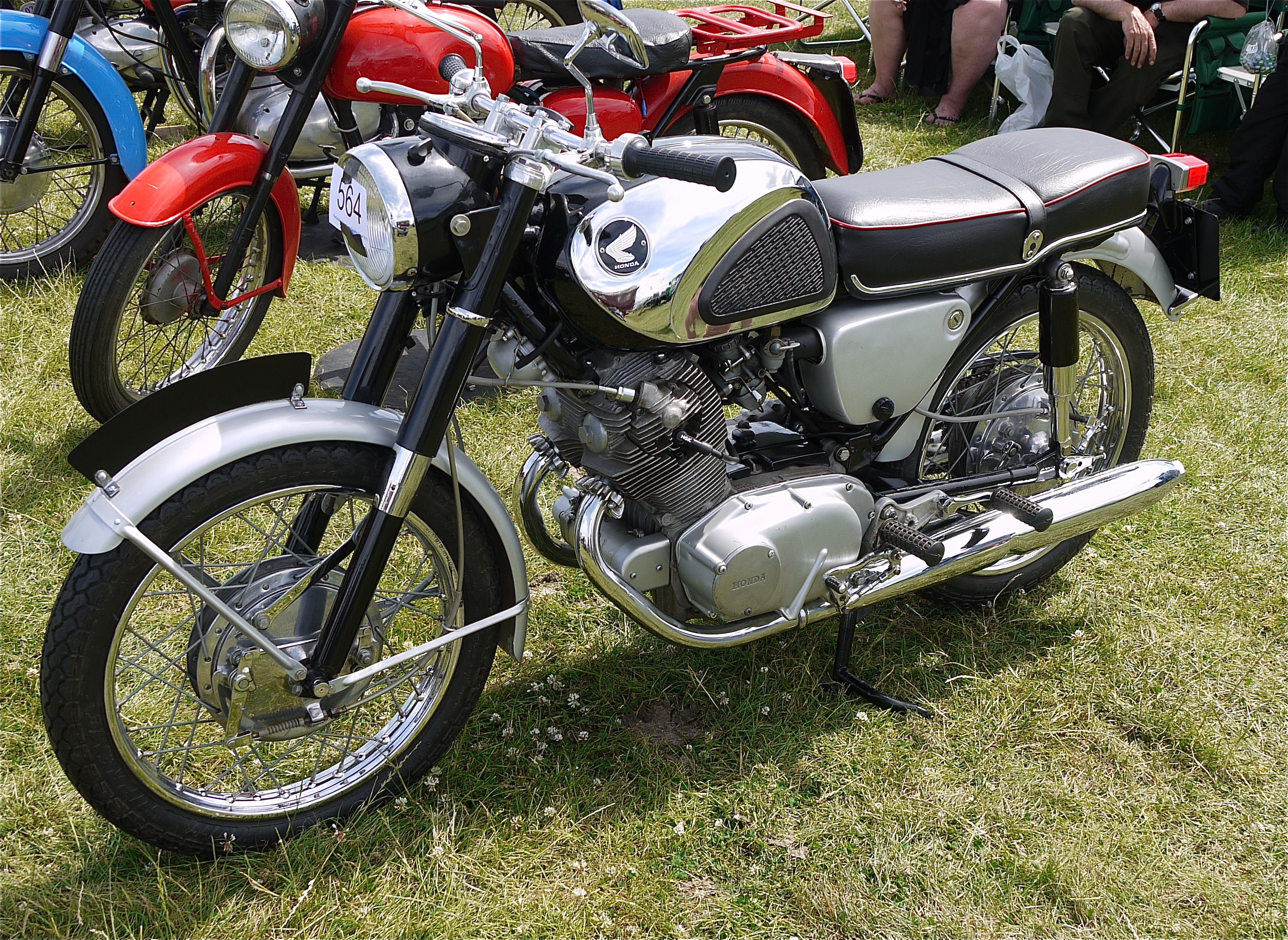
- 1965 Honda Superhawk CB77
- Manufacturer: Honda
- Also called: Super Hawk, Honda 305
- Production: 1961–1968
- Successor: CB350
- Class: Standard, sport bike
- Engine: 305 cc (18.6 cu in) OHC straight-twin, 2 × 26 mm Keihin carburetors kick and electric start
- Bore / stroke: 60.0 mm × 54.0 mm (2.36 in × 2.13 in)
- Compression ratio: 8:1 (9.5:1 in early production)
- Top speed: 168.3 km/h (104.6 mph)
- Power: 28 hp (21 kW) @ 9,000 rpm
- Ignition type: Battery and coil
- Transmission: Multi-disc wet clutch, 4-speed, chain drive
- Frame type: Tubular steel
- Suspension: Front: telescopic fork Rear: swingarm
- Brakes: Drum, 41 sq in (260 cm^{2}) area
- Tires: Front 2.75×18 in. Rear: 3.00×18 in.
- Wheelbase: 1,300 mm (51.0 in)
- Seat height: 760 mm (30.0 in)
- Weight: 159 kg (351 lb) (wet)
- Fuel capacity: 14 L; 3.0 imp gal (3.6 US gal)
- Related: C77; CL77; Honda Dream CB250

The Honda CB77, or Super Hawk, is a 305 cc (18.6 cu in) straight-twin motorcycle produced from 1961 until 1967. It is remembered today as Honda's first sport bike. It is a landmark model in Honda's advances in Western motorcycle markets of the 1960s, noted for its speed and power as well as its reliability, and is regarded as one of the bikes that set the standard for modern motorcycles.

== Characteristics ==
At 305 cc, the CB77 had a relatively big engine in comparison to most other Japanese bikes of the period. Its performance even rivaled much larger motorcycles from other countries. It quickly gained a reputation for reliability, and was equipped with luxuries such as an electric starter.

The engine on the CB77 differed from that of the touring C77 version, in that the crankpins on the crankshaft were spaced 180 degrees apart. This had the benefit of making the engine smoother at higher revs but due to the firing sequence of one power stroke following another, the engine note sounded 'flat' and 'low-revving'.

The CB77 was built on the experience Honda had gained in Grand Prix racing, and differed greatly from previous models. It had a steel-tube frame instead of the pressed frames of earlier Hondas, and a telescopic front fork. The parallel twin engine, the biggest then available in a Honda, was an integral element of the bike's structure, providing stiffness in a frame that had no downtube, and was capable of 9,000 rpm. It could propel the bike at over 100 mph; as fast as British parallel twins with higher displacements, and with great reliability. Cycle World tested its average two-way top speed at 168.3 km/h (104.6 mph), and its 1/4 mi (0.40 km) time at 16.8 seconds reaching 83 mph (134 km/h).

In 2003 author Aaron Frank called it, "the first modern Japanese motorcycle... that established the motorcycle that we still operate under now, more than 40 years later."

== Related bikes ==
Honda also produced a lower-powered 247 cc (15.1 cu in) version called the CB72 Hawk, which had a 54.0 mm (2.13 in) bore and 22 mm (0.87 in) carburetors but otherwise had the same specifications as the CB77. In 1962, Honda introduced an off-road bike, the CL72 250 Scrambler, with the same engine as the Hawk but with a different, full-cradle frame with a skid plate and other adjustments for off-road use. In 1965, the CL77 305 Scrambler appeared, with the bigger engine of the Super Hawk but otherwise similar to the CL72.

== Roustabout ==
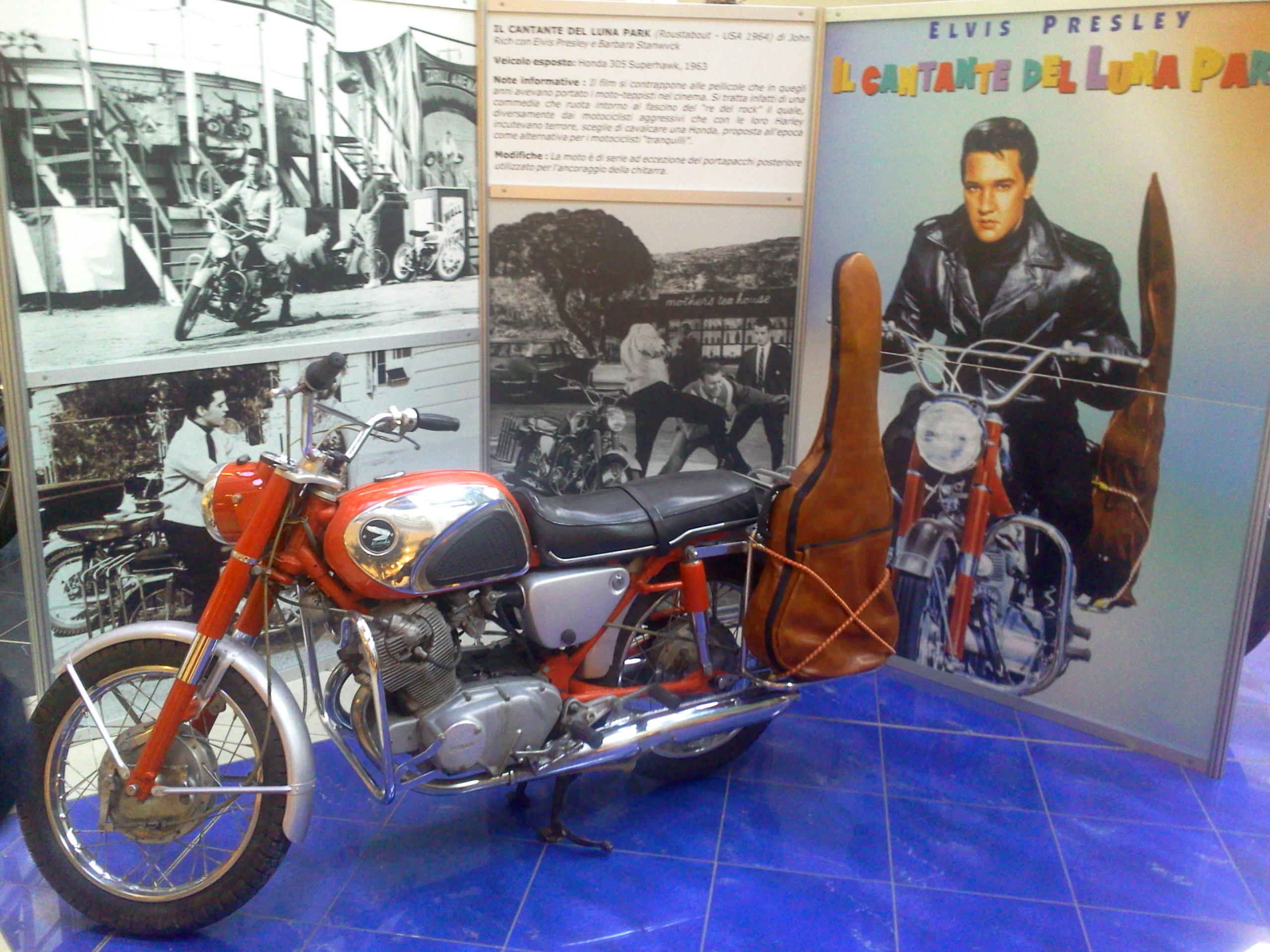
Elvis Presley's 305 Super Hawk from Roustabout

In the 1964 film Roustabout, Elvis Presley rode a CB77 Super Hawk, rather than the Harley-Davidsons Presley would later be associated with, because Paramount Pictures wanted to avoid motorcycles' outlaw image that had originated in media coverage of the 1947 Hollister riot and the 1953 film The Wild One, especially given Presley's scandalous televised hip gyrations. Honda had cultivated a nonthreatening, wholesome image with their "You meet the nicest people on a Honda" advertising campaign, so the CB77 was ideal to make Presley's film persona seem just rebellious enough, but not too much. The film, coinciding with the 1964 Beach Boys song "Little Honda", was free publicity for Honda in the early years of establishing their brand in America.

== Zen and the Art of Motorcycle Maintenance ==
Robert M. Pirsig rode a 1966 CB77 Super Hawk on the trip he made with his son and their friends in 1968 on a two-month round trip from their home in St. Paul, Minnesota to Petaluma, California, which became the basis for the 1974 novel Zen and the Art of Motorcycle Maintenance: An Inquiry into Values. The novel never mentions the make or model of Pirsig's motorcycle, but does discuss their companions', John and Sylvia Sutherland's, new BMW R60/2. The R60/2, prized for its place in motorcycle literature, has changed hands and was regularly ridden. Pirsig died in 2017, and in 2019, his wife Wendy K. Pirsig donated the CB77 to the Smithsonian Institution. The donation included Pirsig's leather jacket and memorabilia from the 1968 trip, and some of his personal tools.
