= Gennie DeWeese =

American painter (1921–2007)

Genevieve "Gennie" DeWeese
- Born: Genevieve Adams; January 10, 1921; Indianapolis, Indiana, U.S.
- Died: November 26, 2007 (aged 86); Bozeman, Montana
- Resting place: Bozeman, Montana
- Education: BFA from Ohio State University (1942), Secondary Teaching Certificate University of Michigan (1943)
- Known for: Artist
- Movement: Modernist
- Spouse: Robert DeWeese

Genevieve "Gennie" DeWeese (née Adams; January 10, 1921 – November 26, 2007) was a modernist painter and prominent member of the art community in Bozeman, Montana. Gennie and her husband, Robert "Bob" DeWeese were notable for the major role they played in the development of the Montana contemporary arts community.

== Early life ==
Genevieve Adams was born on January 10, 1921, in Indianapolis, Indiana, where she spent the first five years of her life. She also lived in St. Louis, Missouri, then Gross Pointe, Michigan for eight years, and finally Columbus, Ohio, where she attended high school. Gennie was the youngest of four girls in her family.

DeWeese graduated from Ohio State University, where she studied with Hoyt Sherman, with a bachelor's degree in fine arts. There, she also met her future husband, Bob DeWeese. In 1943, she received a teaching certificate from the University of Michigan. Gennie moved to Wilmington, Delaware, where she taught school. She also lived briefly in New York City and Battle Creek, Michigan, where she did occupational therapy at an army hospital during World War II. Following the war, Gennie moved to Detroit, Michigan. There, she worked as a substitute teacher three days a week and painted the other four.

After her marriage to Bob DeWeese, the couple lived briefly in Iowa City, Iowa; Columbus, Ohio; and Lubbock, Texas, before moving to Bozeman, Montana. DeWeese settled in Bozeman, Montana, in 1949 with her husband, Robert DeWeese, an instructor of Art at Montana State College.

== Art career in Montana ==
Gennie's husband, Bob, taught art at Montana State College (now Montana State University) while Gennie maintained a studio at their home. From 1950 through 1953, Gennie was the teacher of the Adult Sketch Group, a group sponsored by the Montana Institute of the Arts. She both painted and exhibited her work as well as raising the couple's four children. She began working on a master's thesis at Montana State College, but was interrupted by the birth of her fifth child, Josh.

Gennie and Bob became prominent members of the Montana art and intellectual community and are credited with the development of the modern art movement in Montana.

== Art style ==
Gennie DeWeese's early work is characterized by thick brushwork and domestic subjects. Later in her career, she moved toward landscapes and non-objective abstractions. DeWeese was known for her landscape paintings and woodblock prints. She and her husband were credited with “bringing modernism and non-objective expressionism” to Montana and other regions of the West. The subjects of her early work were primarily landscapes and her family, including her children.

After moving to the Cottonwood Canyon in 1965, DeWeese began creating contemporary non-objective work. She moved from the oils and ink sketches that she had used previously and began utilizing new mediums, including cattle markers, pigment sticks, and paint sticks to create new modernist work based on the landscapes around her. DeWeese also expanded into creating giant scrolls rather than traditional canvases as well as working in wood-cut printmaking, monoprints and lithographs.

== Personal life ==
In 1946, Gennie married Robert "Bob" DeWeese. In 1947, Gennie gave birth to the couple's first child, Cathie, in Iowa City. Their second child, Jan, was born in Columbus, Ohio, in 1948. Bob had accepted a position at Texas Tech in Lubbock Texas, with Gennie and the two children joining him after Jan was born. In 1949, the couple moved to Bozeman, where they had three more children: Gretchen, Tina, and Josh.

In 1965, the DeWeeses purchased land in Cottonwood Canyon and built a house. In 1977, DeWeese and her husband made their Bozeman home into a gallery, where they exhibited work by local artists. The house became a meeting place for the Montana art and intellectual community, including Robert Pirsig, author of Zen and the Art of Motorcycle Maintenance.

== Awards and recognition ==
"DeWeese has won numerous awards and been featured in workshops and publications. In 1983, she served as juror for the Women's Show, at the Black Orchid Gallery in Butte, Montana, and was featured in the October 31 issue of Newsweek in article on Montana artists. In 1985, she was featured as part of a Wall Street Journal article on the Western Arts Foundation. In 1986, she was the curator for Women's Work the Centennial Exhibition. In 1994, she was honored as 'Printmaker of the Year' by the Billings Print Club. In 1995, DeWeese received an Honorary Doctorate of Fine Arts and a Governor's Award for the Arts." In 1995, DeWeese and her husband received the Montana Governor's Award for the Arts, and DeWeese was awarded an honorary doctorate of fine arts from Montana State University. In 1996, a major retrospective of DeWeese's works was presented at the Missoula Art Museum.

The DeWeeses were mentioned by Robert Pirsig in his book, Zen and the Art of Motorcycle Maintenance.

== Later years ==
Gennie DeWeese died on November 26, 2007.
