= Honda CL77 =

CL77 Scrambler
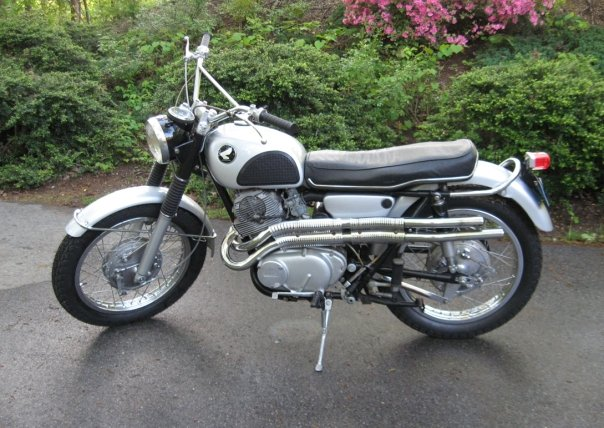
- 1965 Honda CL77 Scrambler 305
- Manufacturer: Honda CL77
- Production: 1965–1968
- Class: Off-road
- Engine: CL77E 305.4 cc (18.64 cu in) OHC 360° crank angle parallel twin
- Bore / stroke: 60 mm × 54 mm (2.4 in × 2.1 in)
- Compression ratio: 9.5:1
- Power: 28.5 bhp (21.3 kW) @ 9000 rpm
- Torque: 2.44 kg⋅m (23.9 N⋅m; 17.6 lbf⋅ft) @ 6500 rpm
- Transmission: 4-speed chain drive
- Frame type: Tube steel
- Suspension: Front: telescoping fork Rear: swingarm
- Tires: Front: 3.0" × 19", Rear: 3.5" × 19"
- Wheelbase: 1,330 mm (52.4 in)
- Dimensions: L: 2,010 mm (79.1 in); W: 820 mm (32.3 in)
- Weight: 160 kg (352 lb) (dry)

The Honda CL77 or Scrambler 305 is the off-road or scrambler version of the Honda C77 Dream and the CB77 Super Hawk of the 1960s.

Scramblers, designated CL by Honda, differed from the sport bikes (designated CB) to allow for some off-road riding. The CL77 differed from the CB77 Super Hawk in a number of ways. To increase ground clearance, it had upswept exhaust pipes running along the bike's left side. A bigger tube frame with a front downtube gave extra strength and ran through the space where the electric starter was mounted in the CB and CA models. Eliminating the starter gave clearance in the frame, and lightened the total weight of the bike. It had a small-capacity painted fuel tank, fork boots, 19-inch front and rear wheels, coarser-tread tires (called universals), a taller handlebar with cross-brace, and abbreviated fenders. Early models had painted aluminum fenders.

The 305.4 cc (18.64 cu in) overhead cam engine had a redline of 9000 rpm and contrasted sharply from the low-revving European and American bikes of the day. Running straight pipes with small internal baffles, CL77s featured a loud and very distinct sound from the 360 degree firing order of this parallel twin. Many of these motorcycles featured aftermarket snuff-or-nots (commonly misspoken as "snuffer nuts"), which featured a flat washer like piece of metal which pivoted just inside the tips of the exhaust pipes to quiet or increase the sound of the exhaust at any time during operation simply by twisting the external knob.

In later years Honda joined the end of the exhaust pipes with an external factory installed muffler to control exhaust noise. At first it was slipped on and clamped. Later models came with only one of the twin side pipes welded onto the slip-on muffler. The last version came with both pipes welded to the slip-on muffler.

In 1962, Dave Ekins and Bill Robertson Jr. rode two CL72 Scramblers the entire length of Mexico's Baja Peninsula, in a PR effort for Honda; the feat would also effectively serve as a pioneering run for the Baja 1000 off-road race. That race's first official running was in 1967, and in 1968, Larry Berquist and Gary Preston won the second official Baja 1000 race on a CL350 to give the model off-road credibility.
