= Honda Dream 250 and 300 =

250 cc and 305 cc motorcycles

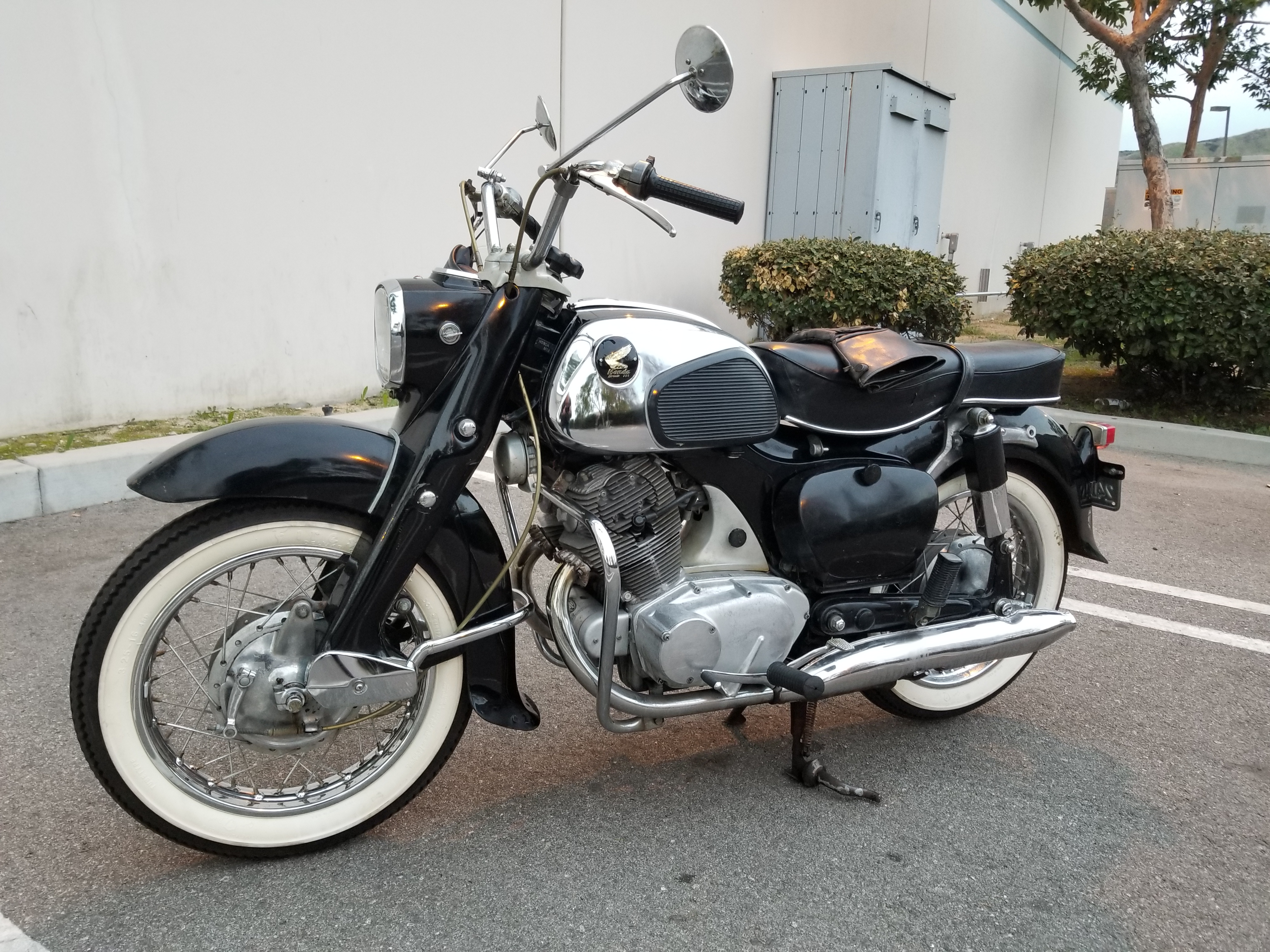
1962 Honda CA72 250cc Dream "early model"

The 250 cc (15 cu in) Honda C71 and C72 Dream, and the identical C76 and C77 bikes with 305 cc (18.6 cu in) displacement, were the first larger-capacity motorcycles that Honda mass-exported. They were characterised by a pressed steel frame and alloy overhead cam, twin-cylinder engine, and were very well equipped, with 12 volt electrics, electric starter, indicators, dual seats and other advanced features not common to most motorcycles of the period.

== History ==
These bikes started out as the Honda C70 Dream. Soichiro Honda had dubbed many of his earlier bikes 'Dream' after his dream of building complete motorcycles.

=== 1950s ===
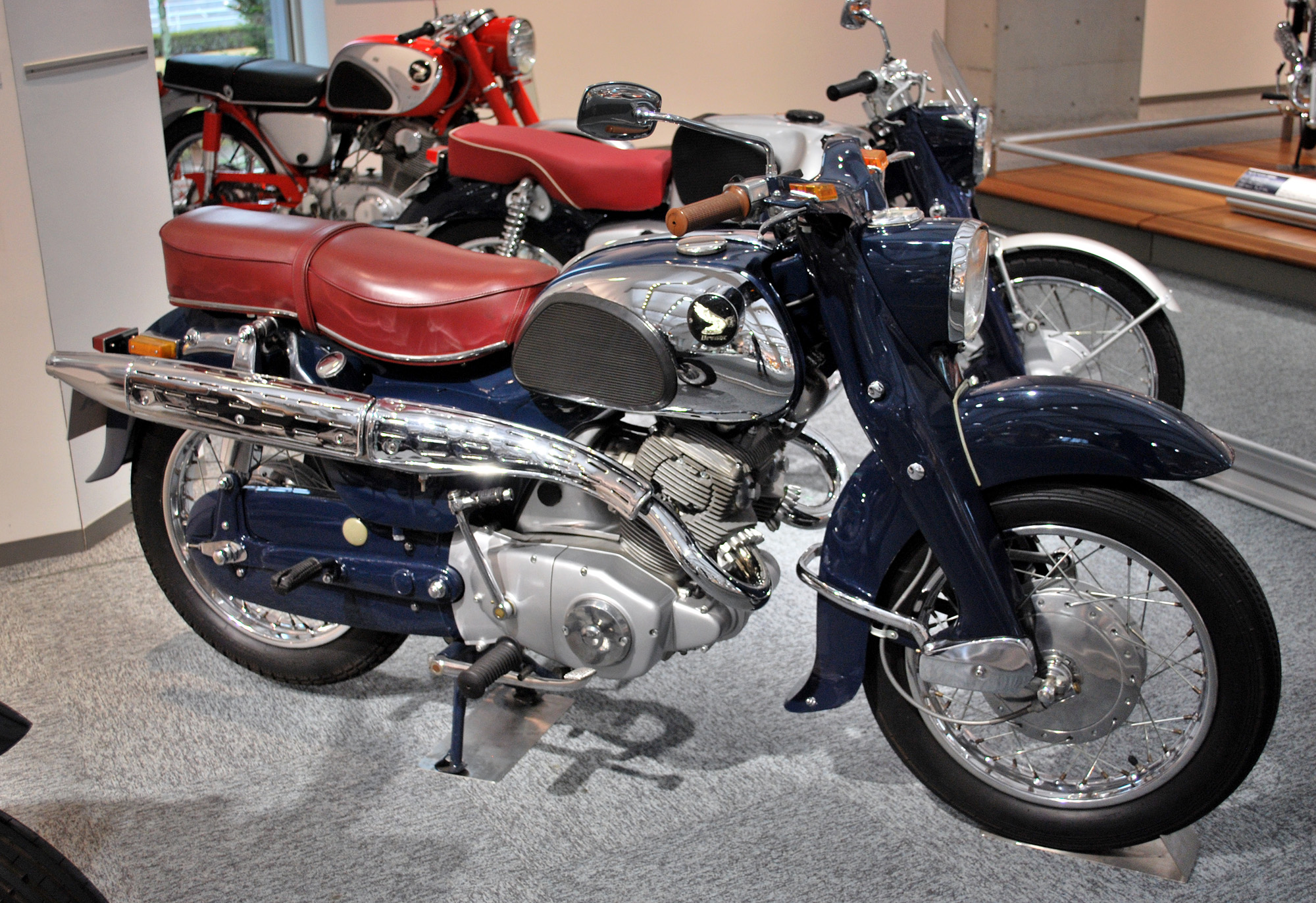
1958 Honda CS71

The C70 was a 250cc pressed-frame motorcycle, with a very similar frame to later machines, released in 1956. It was usually seen with a single seat and rack, with clip-on pillion pad.

The C75 was the 305cc version of the C70. It had a square head-light and shock absorbers, leading link forks, pressed-steel handlebars and were somewhat unusual in appearance. The engine was dry sumped, and had six-volt electrics. The design of frame and engine was heavily influenced by bikes built by NSU Motorenwerke AG, which Soichiro Honda had seen on his visit to Europe in 1955, including the Isle of Man TT races.

The C71 and C76 were later developments, from 1957 or 1958 onwards. The C71 was the 250cc bike, while the C76 was 305cc. Not much had changed visually, but they were fitted with electric starters. Dual seats were common on export bikes, but the single seat/rack combination was available. They were exported worldwide. A C71 was shown in the Netherlands in 1958, and shown at the Earls Court show in either 1958 or 1959, while the C76 became the flagship bike for the Honda range released into the US in 1959.

There was a version specifically built for the US market called the CA76, which came equipped with conventional tubular handlebars, although the standard pressed-steel bar C71 and C76 were also sold in the US. In the end, only a small handful were exported around the world. These were the first of the Honda 'Dreams' sold outside Japan. Also available was the 'Dream Sport' bikes with high exhaust pipes, the CS71/CS76 and CSA71/CSA76. All sold well in their home market, and have attained cult-status amongst Japanese collectors.

The CE71 Dream Sport is a closely related version, and very rare. The dry-sumped engine, in the same pressed frame, with tubular handlebars, low sports exhaust pipes and dual seat, with an angular fuel tank similar to the CB92. They were exported to the US and Europe. Just over 400 were made and they were all recalled, with most scrapped.

Another rare version was the CB71 – another sports version of the dry sump bikes. It was only available in Japan, and it only in limited numbers. It was very reminiscent of the CB92 – pressed frame, flat 'ace' handlebars, fly screen, low megaphone exhaustpipes, cut down rear mudguard, cycle-style front guard, angular fueltank with the 'wrap-over' rubber kneepad of the CB92.

=== 1960s ===
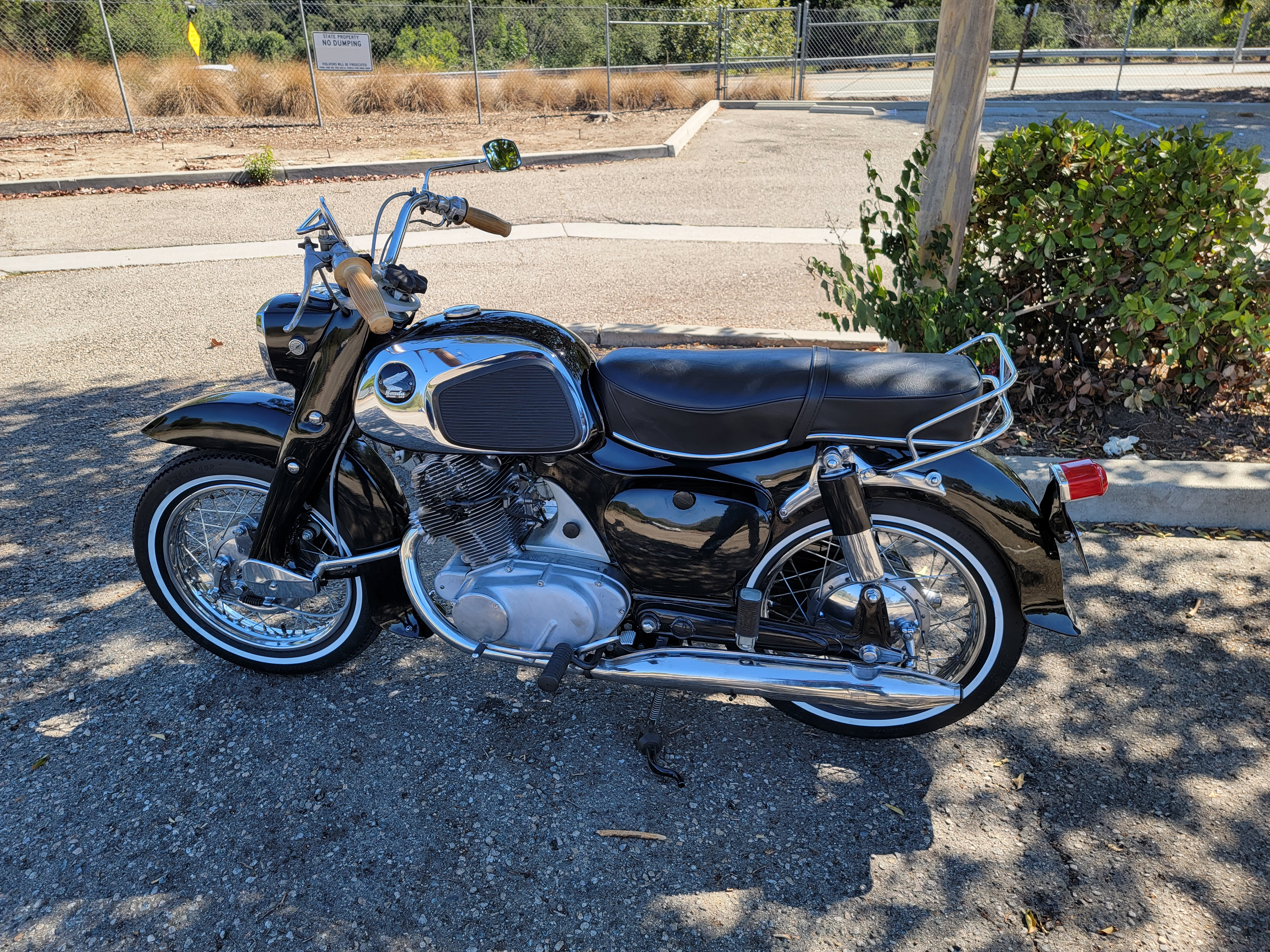
1963 Honda CA77 305 Dream "early" version.

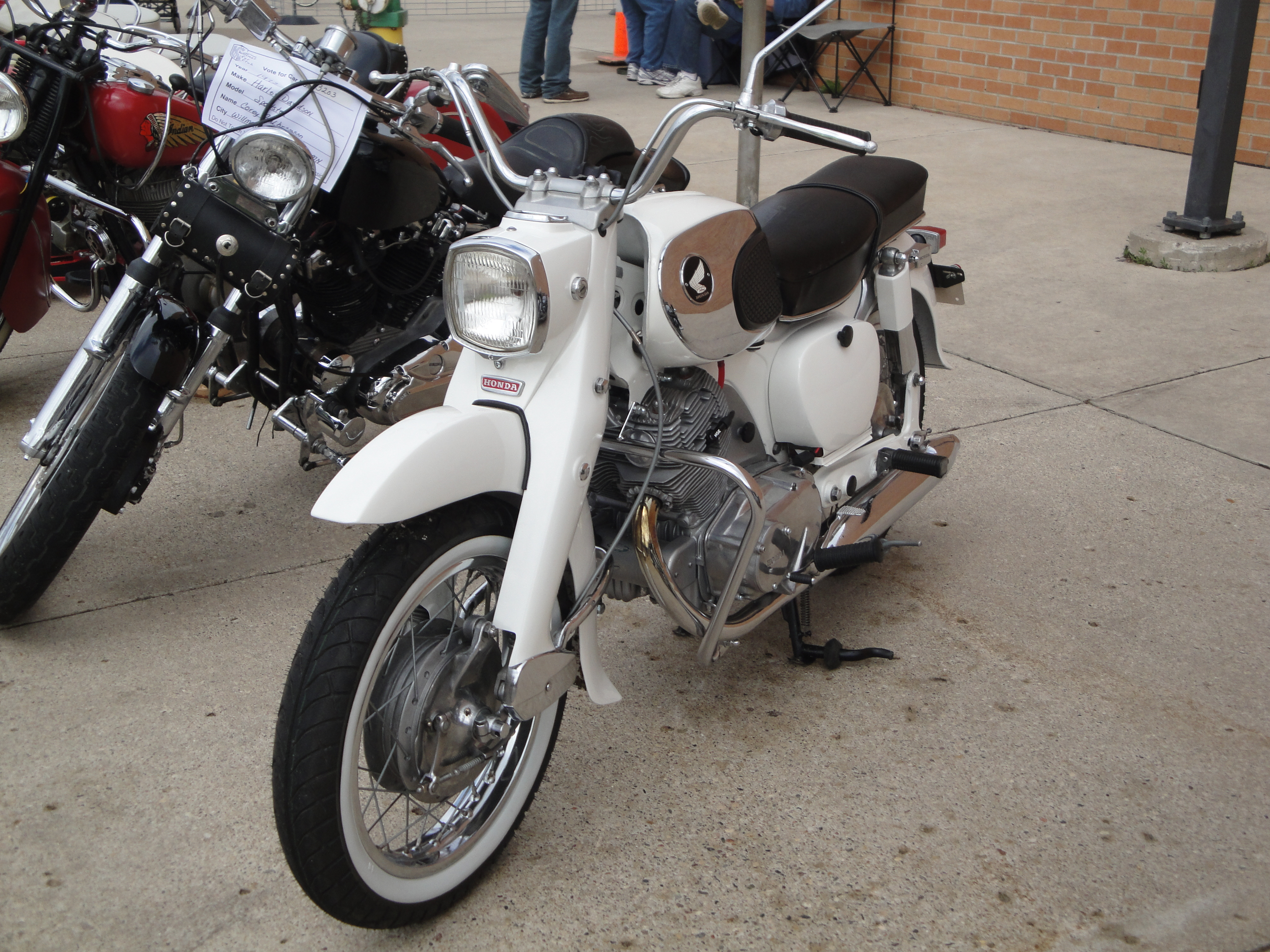
1964 Honda CA77

The final development of these bikes, the C72/C77, was available from 1960. A 1960 C72/C77 would be a very rare bike; most came out in 1961. The American market CA72/CA77 was available in 1961. These bikes were made until 1967, although it seems that because of the way US bikes are dated, many are referred to in the US as 1968 or even 1969 models. These bikes saw a completely redesigned engine: a wet-sump design with many internal differences, essentially a new motor, with electric start and 12 V system.

The C72 and C77 had pressed steel handlebars, while the CA72 and CA77 had high tubular bars. Beyond that there were only minor differences, different indicators were fitted to the non-US bikes to suit the countries laws. Bikes built up to 1963 had a different fuel tank shape to later bikes, and the pressed steel bars were discontinued at about the same time (all models using conventional tubular bars) but otherwise the bike stayed much the same for the rest of its run. There was also a version of the bike called the C78/CA78, but visually there were no substantial differences to the C77/CA77.

Pre-1963 CA77s were considered as well-equipped touring/commuter bikes — not particularly sporting, but reliable and comfortable, with a turn of speed much better than many larger-capacity bikes. Like the earlier dry-sump bikes, there were high-exhaust sports version, the CS72 and CS77, and the corresponding American market CSA72 and CSA77.

The C72/C77 was exported to Europe, Britain, Australia and other markets, and sold in some numbers, although as it was comparatively expensive, not as well as hoped. Post-WW2 anti-Japanese sentiment was still rife, and in the UK, manufacturers like BSA and Triumph attempted to convince dealers not to sell Japanese bikes. Also, the style was considered to be somewhat unusual to European eyes, and by the mid-1960s quite old-fashioned.

== Legacy and influence ==
A re-development of the engine was used in the seminal CB72 and its 305cc cousin, the CB77, which were ground-breaking sports motorcycles of their day. The CL72 and CL77 Scramblers also used the same engines. In addition, the engine was studied, and developed and enlarged by the Laverda factory as the basis of their 650cc and 750cc twin cylinder engines.

These days, these Honda models are considered collectibles, and have a strong following in the Vintage Japanese Motorcycle Club.

== See also ==
- List of motorcycles of the 1950s
