= Quality (philosophy) =

Attribute or a property characteristic of an object in philosophy

In philosophy, a quality is an attribute or a property characteristic of an object. In contemporary philosophy the idea of qualities, and especially how to distinguish certain kinds of qualities from one another, remains controversial.

== Background ==
Aristotle analyzed qualities in his work on logic, the Categories. To him, qualities are hylomorphically–formal attributes, such as "white" or "grammatical". Categories of state, such as "shod" and "armed" are also non–essential qualities (katà symbebekós). Aristotle observed: "one and the selfsame substance, while retaining its identity, is yet capable of admitting contrary qualities. The same individual person is at one time white, at another black, at one time warm, at another cold, at one time good, at another bad. This capacity is found nowhere else... it is the peculiar mark of substance that it should be capable of admitting contrary qualities; for it is by itself changing that it does so". Aristotle described four types of qualitative opposites: correlatives, contraries, privatives and positives.

John Locke presented a distinction between primary and secondary qualities in An Essay Concerning Human Understanding. For Locke, a quality is an idea of a sensation or a perception. Locke further asserts that qualities can be divided in two kinds: primary and secondary qualities. Primary qualities are intrinsic to an object—a thing or a person—whereas secondary qualities are dependent on the interpretation of the subjective mode and the context of appearance. For example, a shadow is a secondary quality. It requires a certain lighting to be applied to an object. For another example, consider the mass of an object. Weight is a secondary quality since, as a measurement of gravitational force, it varies depending on the distance to, and mass of, very massive objects like the Earth, as described by Newton's law. It could be thought that mass is intrinsic to an object, and thus a primary quality. In the context of relativity, the idea of mass quantifying an amount of matter requires caution. The relativistic mass varies for variously traveling observers; then there is the idea of rest mass or invariant mass (the magnitude of the energy-momentum 4-vector), basically a system's relativistic mass in its own rest frame of reference. (Note, however, that Aristotle drew a distinction between qualification and quantification; a thing's quality can vary in degree).

== Conceptions of quality as metaphysical and ontological ==
Philosophy and common sense tend to see qualities as related either to subjective feelings or to objective facts. The qualities of something depends on the criteria being applied to and, from a neutral point of view, do not determine its value (the philosophical value as well as economic value). Subjectively, something might be good because it is useful, because it is beautiful, or simply because it exists. Determining or finding qualities therefore involves understanding what is useful, what is beautiful and what exists. Commonly, quality can mean degree of excellence, as in, "a quality product" or "work of average quality". It can also refer to a property of something such as "the addictive quality of nicotine". In his book, Zen and the Art of Motorcycle Maintenance, Robert M. Pirsig examines concepts of quality in classical and romantic, seeking a Metaphysics of Quality and a reconciliation of those views in terms of non-dualistic holism.

Quality (Latin: quality, characteristic, property, condition) has three meanings:

a) neutral: the sum of all properties of an object, system or process b) evaluates: the quality of all properties of an object, system or process c) evaluates: the individual values preceding the action and its results With regard to points a) and b), quality is the designation of a perceptible state of systems and their characteristics, which is defined in this state in a certain period of time based on certain properties of the system. Quality could describe a product such as wine and its chemical components and the resulting subjectively assessable taste, as well as the processes of ripening the grape, the production and distribution of the wine, or the process of managing the winery. In the meaning b) one speaks of quality wine or wine with predicate or of excellent management.

With reference to c), quality is the sum of the individual (value) attitudes (properties) of a target-oriented individual. Quality is differentiated by "having" or "being". The aim to which qualitative action is directed towards goals or effects also has fundamental effects on the creation of long-term growing cultural capital and thus on the existence of trust values in a cooperating, stable, and in particular democratic society.

== See also ==
- Similarity (philosophy)
