= Robert M. Pirsig =

American writer and philosopher (1928–2017)

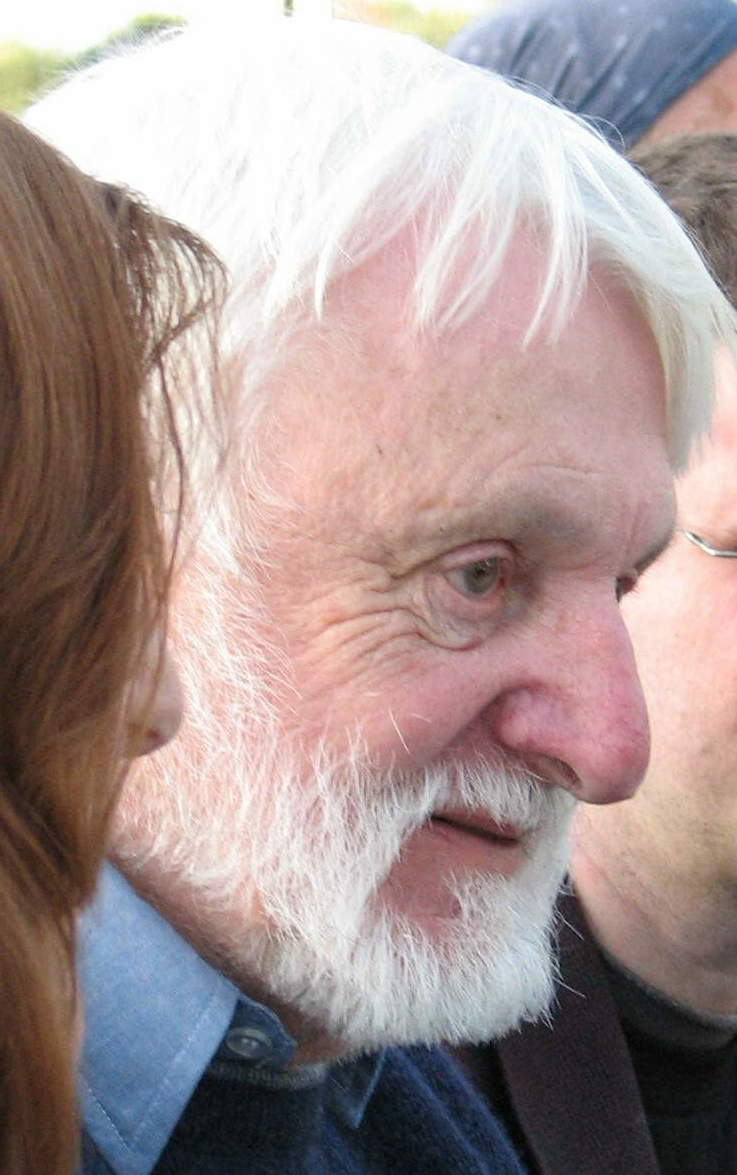
- Pirsig in 2005
- Born: Robert Maynard Pirsig; September 6, 1928; Minneapolis, Minnesota, U.S.
- Died: April 24, 2017 (aged 88); South Berwick, Maine, U.S.
- Education: University of Minnesota (BA, MA); Banaras Hindu University; University of Chicago
- Occupations: Writer; philosopher
- Spouses: Nancy Ann James (m. 1954; div. 1978) Wendy Kimball (m. 1978)
- Children: 3
- Parent: Maynard Pirsig (father)
- Writing career
- Genre: Philosophical fiction
- Notable works: Zen and the Art of Motorcycle Maintenance (1974); Lila: An Inquiry into Morals (1991)
- Notable awards: Guggenheim Fellowship (1974)

Robert Maynard Pirsig (/ˈpɜːrsɪɡ/; September 6, 1928 – April 24, 2017) was an American writer and philosopher. He is the author of the philosophical books Zen and the Art of Motorcycle Maintenance: An Inquiry into Values (1974) and Lila: An Inquiry into Morals (1991), and he co-authored On Quality: An Inquiry Into Excellence: Selected and Unpublished Writings (2022) along with his wife and editor, Wendy Pirsig.

== Early life, family and education ==
Pirsig was born on September 6, 1928, in Minneapolis, Minnesota, the son of Harriet Marie Sjobeck and Maynard Pirsig. He was of German and Swedish descent. His father was a graduate of the University of Minnesota Law School, taught in that school from 1934, served as its dean from 1948 to 1955, and retired from teaching there in 1970. Pirsig senior subsequently taught at the William Mitchell College of Law until his retirement in 1993.

A precocious child with an alleged IQ of 170 at age nine, Pirsig skipped several grades at the Blake School in Minneapolis. In May 1943, he was awarded a high school diploma at age 14 by the University High School (later renamed Marshall-University High School), where he had edited the school yearbook, The Bisbilla.

Pirsig studied biochemistry at the University of Minnesota. In Zen and the Art of Motorcycle Maintenance, he describes the central character, thought to represent himself, as being an atypical student, interested in science in itself rather than as a professional career path.

In the course of his studies, Pirsig became intrigued by the multiplicity of putative causes for a given phenomenon, and increasingly focused on the role played by hypotheses in the scientific method and sources from which they originate. His preoccupation with these matters led to a decline in his grades and expulsion from the university.

In 1946, Pirsig enlisted in the United States Army and was stationed in South Korea until 1948. Upon his discharge from the military, he lived for several months in Seattle, Washington, and then returned to the University of Minnesota, earning his bachelor's degree in 1950. He and his wife worked at the Nevada Club in Reno, Nevada, and saved enough to move to Acayucan, Mexico, with the intent to write a great book.

He subsequently studied philosophy at Banaras Hindu University in India and the Committee on the Analysis of Ideas and Study of Methods at the University of Chicago. In 1958 he earned a master's degree in journalism from the University of Minnesota.

== Career ==
In 1958, he became a professor at Montana State University in Bozeman, and taught creative writing courses for two years. He was friends with Bob DeWeese and Gennie DeWeese there. Shortly thereafter he taught at the University of Illinois at Chicago.

Pirsig's major published work consists of two books: the better known Zen and the Art of Motorcycle Maintenance (1974) and its follow up Lila: An Inquiry into Morals (1991).

In the mid- to late 1960s, Pirsig was working as a technical writer for Northern Pump (which became Northern Ordinance). In 1968, he had the idea to write an essay about how he went about fixing motorcycles and how it related to what he knew about Zen religious ideas. This grew into a synopsis for the novel. Pirsig had difficulty finding a publisher at this stage, pitching the idea for his book to 121 different publishers. He sent them a cover letter along with two sample pages; twenty two of which responded favorably. William Morrow and Company gave Pirsig a US$3000 advance for the project. In July 1968, he went on the road trip, with his son Chris, that greatly informed the book.

Pirsig took nearly four years to complete Zen and the Art of Motorcycle Maintenance, writing most of the book while living above a shoe store in south Minneapolis, while working as a tech writer for Honeywell. Ultimately, an editor at William Morrow accepted the finished manuscript; Zen and the Art of Motorcycle Maintenance was published in 1974. Pirsig's publisher's internal recommendation stated, "This book is brilliant beyond belief, it is probably a work of genius, and will, I'll wager, attain classic stature." The book is an exploration of Pirsig's particular concept of quality, and how it relates to reality. Ostensibly a first-person narrative based on a motorcycle trip he and his young son Chris had taken from Minneapolis to San Francisco, it is an exploration of the underlying metaphysics of Western culture. He also gives the reader a short summary of the history of philosophy, including his interpretation of the philosophy of Aristotle as part of an ongoing dispute between universalists, admitting the existence of universals, and the Sophists, opposed by Socrates and his student Plato. Pirsig finds in quality a special significance and common ground between Western and Eastern world views. Pirsig described the development of his ideas and writing his book in a lecture at the Minneapolis College of Art and Design on May 20, 1974.

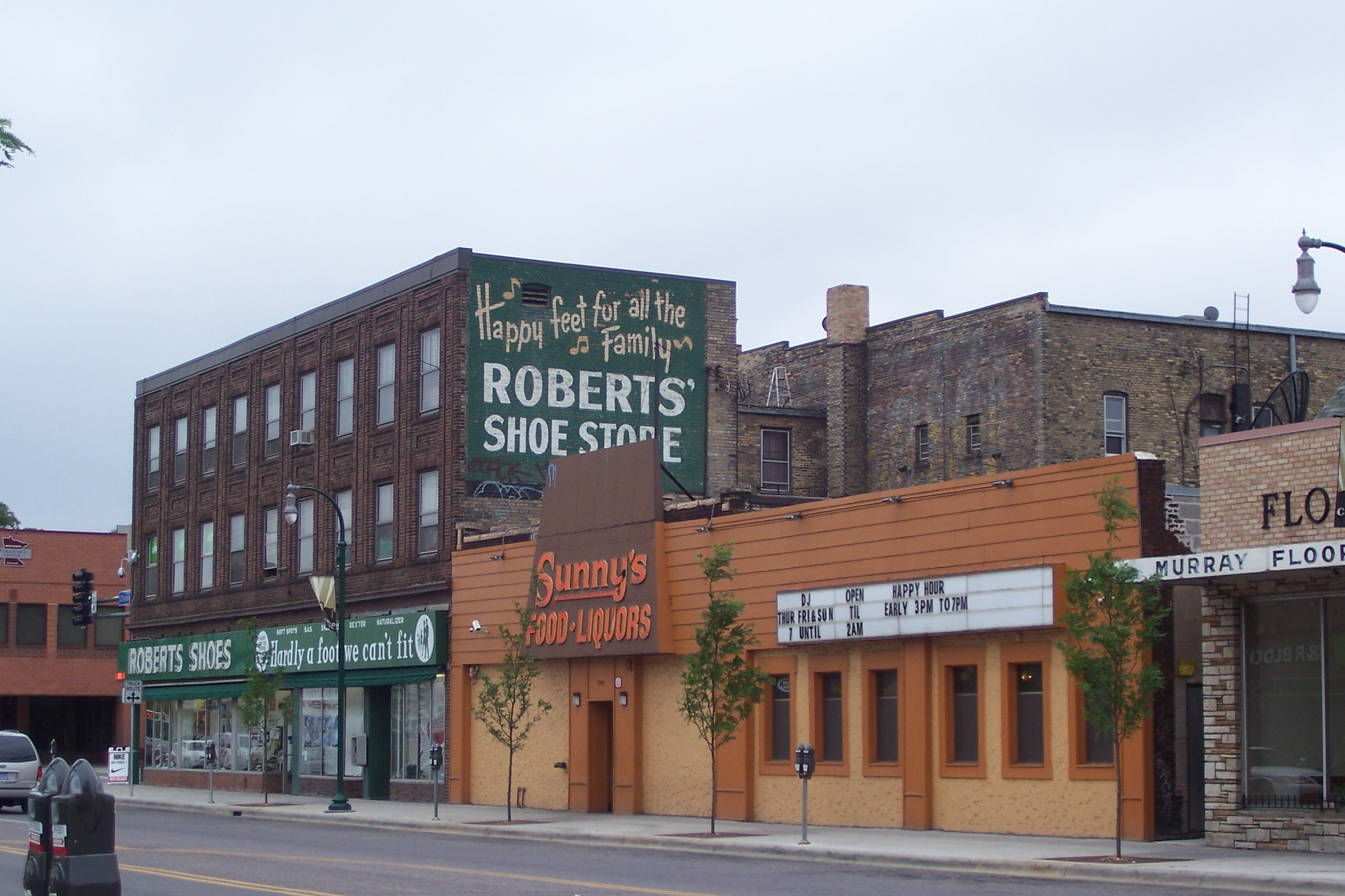
Roberts Shoes on the corner of Chicago and Lake in Minneapolis, where Pirsig lived while writing Zen and the Art of Motorcycle Maintenance.

In his book review, George Steiner compared Pirsig's writing to Dostoevsky, Broch, Proust, and Bergson, stating that "the assertion itself is valid ... the analogies with Moby-Dick are patent".

Pirsig was vice-president of the Minnesota Zen Meditation Center from 1973 to 1975 and also served on the board of directors.

In 1974, Pirsig was awarded a Guggenheim Fellowship. This allowed him to work on a follow-up. For this book he developed a value-based metaphysics, Metaphysics of Quality, that challenges our subject–object view of reality.

In 1991, the book, Lila: An Inquiry into Morals, was published by Bantam Books. This time the narrator is 'the captain' of a sailboat, following on from where Zen and the Art of Motorcycle Maintenance left off. Lila was not as commercially successful as his first book, but Pirsig felt it was the more important. He remained frustrated by what he saw as a lack of engagement in the philosophical ideas he put forward, including ideas from William James Sidis and James Verne Dusenberry.

== Personal life and death ==
Robert Pirsig married Nancy Ann James on May 10, 1954. They had two sons: Chris, born in 1956, and Theodore (Ted), born in 1958.

Pirsig had a mental breakdown and spent time in and out of psychiatric hospitals between 1961 and 1963. He was diagnosed with schizophrenia and treated with electroconvulsive therapy on numerous occasions, a treatment he discusses in Zen and the Art of Motorcycle Maintenance. Nancy sought a divorce during this time; they formally separated in 1976 and divorced in 1978. On December 28, 1978, Pirsig married Wendy Kimball in Tremont, Maine.

In 1979, his son Chris, who figured prominently in Zen and the Art of Motorcycle Maintenance, was fatally stabbed in a mugging outside the San Francisco Zen Center; he was 22 years old. Pirsig discusses this tragedy in an afterword to subsequent editions of Zen and the Art of Motorcycle Maintenance, writing that he and his second wife Wendy Kimball decided not to abort the child they conceived in 1980 because he believed that this unborn child – later their daughter Nell – was a continuation of the "life pattern" that Chris had occupied.

On April 24, 2017, after a period of failing health, Pirsig died at age 88 at his home in South Berwick, Maine.

== Legacy and recognition ==
Pirsig received a Guggenheim Fellowship in 1974 for General Nonfiction, which later allowed him to complete his second book. The University of Minnesota conferred an Outstanding Achievement Award in 1975. He won an award for literature from the American Academy and Institute of Arts and Letters in 1979.

On December 15, 2012, Montana State University bestowed upon Pirsig an honorary doctorate in philosophy during the university's fall commencement. Pirsig was also honored in a commencement speech by MSU Regent Professor Michael Sexson. Pirsig had been an instructor in writing at what was then Montana State College from 1958 to 1960.

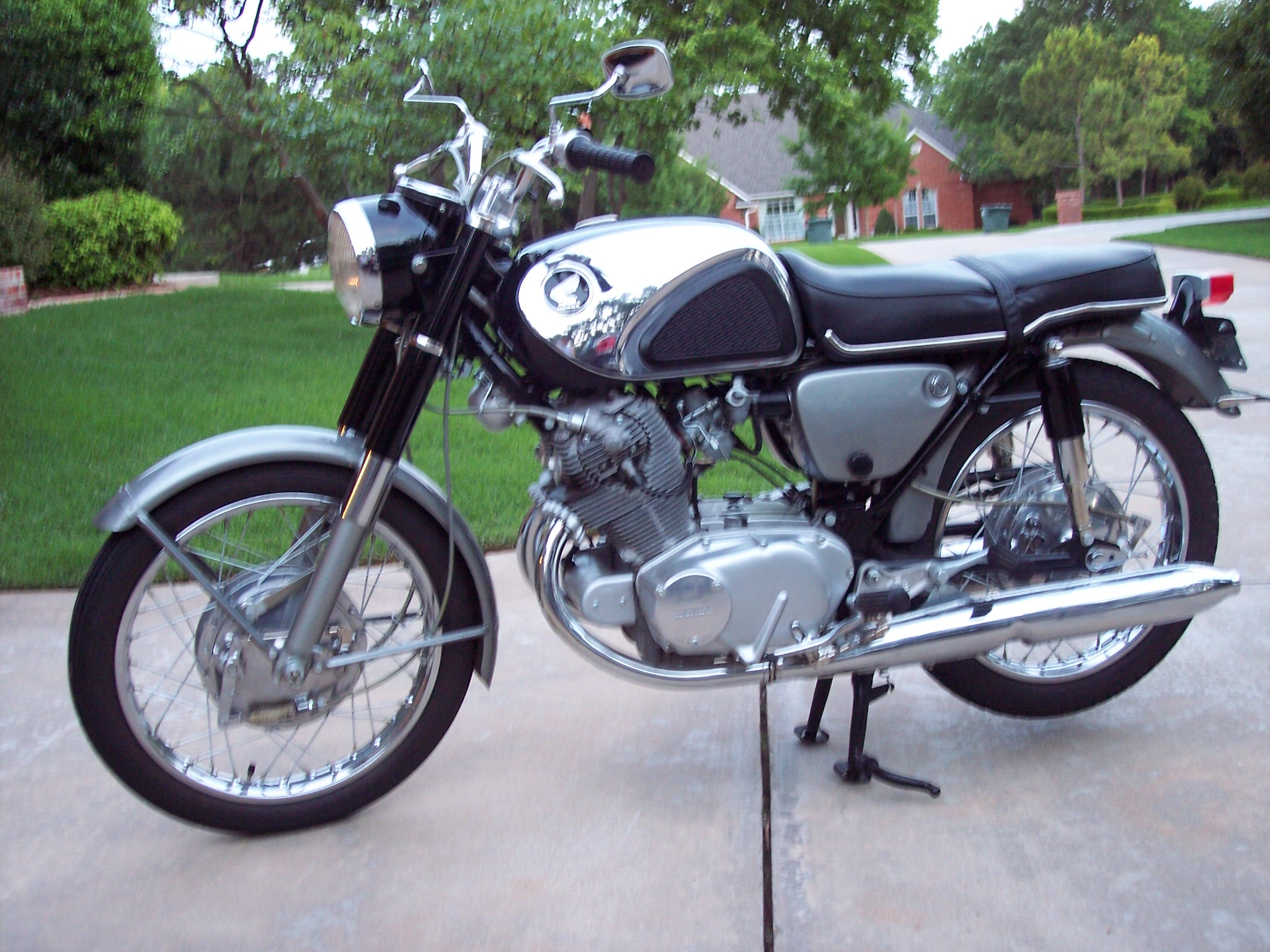
A 1967 Honda CB77 Super Hawk, similar to the 1966 model Pirsig rode.

Pirsig did not travel to Bozeman in December 2012 to accept the accolade, allegedly due to frailty of health. However, in Zen and the Art of Motorcycle Maintenance, Pirsig writes about his time at Montana State College as a less than pleasurable experience, and that this limited his ability to teach writing effectively and to develop his own philosophy and writing.

In December 2019, the Smithsonian Institution's National Museum of American History in Washington, DC, acquired Pirsig's 1966 Honda CB77 Super Hawk on which the 1968 ride with his son Chris was taken. The donation included a manuscript of Zen and the Art of Motorcycle Maintenance, a signed first edition of the book, and tools and clothing from the ride. In 2020, the museum acquired additional material from the Pirsig family relating to his maritime interests and background. In April 2024 Pirsig's bike went on public display for the first time ever, marking the fiftieth anniversary of Zen and the Art of Motorcycle Maintenance. The exhibition, "America on the Move", also displayed the book's original manuscript, Pirsig's manual typewriter and an Apple II computer. As materials were gathered for the exhibition a graphic novel by Pirsig was found. Entitled Doctor Schnabel, it is about the bubonic plague pandemic that struck in Europe in the 1300s.

In 2020, the Robert M. Pirsig archive was collected by the Houghton Library at Harvard University, Cambridge, Massachusetts; an additional collection resides at the Montana State University Library.

A 2021 article in the International Journal of Motorcycle Studies details the writer's close historic relationship with motorcycles from the age of four to shortly before his death.

His use of an Apple II and relationship with the company led to him being honored by 'the Pirsig Meeting Room', at one of Apple's Cupertino offices, being named after him.

== See also ==
- James Verne Dusenberry
- Pirsig's Metaphysics of Quality
