= James Verne Dusenberry =

- Born: April 7, 1906; Corning, Iowa
- Died: December 16, 1966 (aged 60); Calgary, Alberta
- Occupation: Anthropologist

James Verne Dusenberry (April 7, 1906 – December 16, 1966) was a publicly acclaimed scholar. He is best known for his writings on and the relationships he built with many of the various Montana tribes throughout his lifetime.

== Early life ==
Verne Dusenberry was born in Corning, Iowa on April 7, 1906. When Dusenberry was young, his family moved to Montana. His interest in Native Americans grew and he soon became well-acquainted with the surrounding tribes of Montana. In 1937, he was adopted by a Pend d'Oreille chief and given the name "Many Grizzly Bears". After working his way through college and dealing with tuberculosis, he earned a job located on the Flathead Indian Reservation.

Dusenberry was previously married and had a daughter named Lynn Dusenberry, who was very involved with her father's research. She too, was well acquainted with the Montana Native tribes and assisted her father with his book.

== Influence ==
Robert M. Pirsig was a personal friend and one of Dusenberry's supportive colleagues in the Montana State College English Department. Dusenberry appeared as a pivotal thematic figure in Pirsig's book Lila: An Inquiry into Morals. Pirsig said that "Verne was misunderstood and underestimated both as a person and as a scholar" and that he hoped the publication of Lila would "help to set the record straight."

== Publications ==
- Chief Joseph's Flight Through Montana (1952)
- The Rocky Boy Indians (1954)
- The Northern Cheyenne (1955)
- Montanans Look at their Indians (1955)
- Horn in the Ice (1956)
- The Development of Montana's Indians (1957)
- Waiting for a Day that Never Comes (1958)
- Indians and the Pentecostals (1958)
- Gabriel Nattau's Soul Speaks (1959)
- Vision Experience of a Pend d'Oreille Indian (1959)
- Notes on the Material Culture of the Assiniboine (1960)
- An Appreciation of James Willard Schultz (1960)
- The Significance of the Sacred Pipes to the Gros Ventre of Montana (1961)
- Ceremonial Sweat Lodge of the Gros Ventre Indians (1962)
