= Lila: An Inquiry into Morals =

1991 novel by Robert M. Pirsig

- First edition
- Author: Robert M. Pirsig
- Language: English
- Genre: Philosophical novel
- Publisher: Bantam Books
- Publication date: 1991 (revised edition published 2006)
- Publication place: United States
- Media type: Print (Hardback & Paperback)
- Pages: 409 pp
- ISBN: 0-553-07873-9 (first edition, hardback)
- OCLC: 23732047
- Dewey Decimal: 813/.54 20
- LC Class: PS3566.I66 L54 1991
- Preceded by: Zen and the Art of Motorcycle Maintenance: An Inquiry into Values

Lila: An Inquiry into Morals (1991) is the second philosophical novel by Robert M. Pirsig, who is best known for Zen and the Art of Motorcycle Maintenance. Lila: An Inquiry into Morals was a nominated finalist for the Pulitzer Prize for Fiction in 1992. This semi-autobiographical story takes place in the autumn as the author sails his boat down the Hudson River. Phaedrus, the author's alter ego, is jarred out of his solitary routine by an encounter with Lila, a straightforward but troubled woman who is nearing a mental breakdown.

== Major themes ==
The main goal of this book is to develop a complete metaphysical system based on the idea of Quality introduced in his first book. As in his previous book, the narrative is embedded between rounds of philosophical discussion. Unlike his previous book, in which he creates a dichotomy between Classical and Romantic Quality, this book centers on the division of Quality into the Static and the Dynamic. According to the novel, the known universe can be divided into four Static values: inorganic, biological, social, and intellectual. Everything in the known universe can be categorized into one of these four categories, except Dynamic Quality. Because Dynamic Quality is indefinable, the novel discusses the interactions between the four Static values and the Static values themselves.

Another goal of this book is to critique the field of anthropology. Pirsig claims traditional objectivity renders the field ineffective. He then turns his concept of Quality toward an explanation of the difficulties Western society has had in understanding the values and perspectives of American Indians. One interesting conclusion is that modern American culture is the result of a melding of Native American and European values.

Another theme analyzed using the Metaphysics of Quality is the interaction between intellectual and social patterns. Pirsig states that until the end of the Victorian era, social patterns dominated the conduct of members of the American culture. In the aftermath of World War I, intellectual patterns and the scientific method acceded to that position, becoming responsible for directing the nation's goals and actions. The later occurrences of fascism are seen as an anti-intellectual struggle to return social patterns to the dominant position. The hippie movement, having perceived the flaws inherent in both social and intellectual patterns, sought to transcend them, but failed to provide a stable replacement, degenerating instead into lower level biological patterns as noted in its calls for free love.

As a concrete example of a moral dilemma, Pirsig notes the example of Lila, whose affair with a married man would have gone unnoticed but for the intervention of a friend who felt a moral responsibility to expose it, thus ruining the man's marriage and career, and exacerbating the titular character's tendencies towards mental illness.

== Name inspiration ==
Although Pirsig attended graduate studies of Hindu philosophy at Banaras Hindu University and also attended Ramlila celebrations in India, the name of the female character is only accidentally the same as the Hindu concept of Lila. "I asked Pirsig ... he said it was like 'lilac,' and that, 'it was the unsubtlety of the lilac odour and the hardiness of the bush that helped suggest her name to me.'"

== Reception ==
In an interview, the author said that he was disappointed that more 'seriously thinking people' did not really understand his ideas entirely. Many people, he said, wrote to him that they re-read the book many times but still did not really understand it, adding "I have read many reviews criticizing my ideas, but I have yet to see anything that proves me wrong. I'd like to give a prize to the first person who can convince me that my ideas about a metaphysics of quality are wrong."

== See also ==
- James Verne Dusenberry
