= Bob DeWeese (artist) =

American artist (1920–1990)

- Born: Robert Kennel DeWeese; 1920; Troy, Ohio, US
- Died: November 20, 1990; Billings, Montana, US
- Education: B.S. from Ohio State University (1942), M.F.A. from University of Iowa (1948
- Occupations: Artist and art professor
- Employer: Montana State College
- Known for: Modernist painter and printmaker in Montana

Robert Kennel DeWeese (1920–1990) was a Modernist artist in Montana who taught art at Montana State University and produced his own works with a focus in painting and printmaking.

== Early life and education ==
Bob DeWeese was born on December 23, 1920, to Robert William DeWeese and Lona Kennel in Troy, Ohio. He grew up in Ohio and graduated from Troy High School in 1938.

Bob earned his Bachelor of Science degree in art from Ohio State University in 1942 after studying with Hoyt Sherman. While at OSU, he also met his future wife, Genevieve Adams. In 1948, Bob received his Master of Fine Art degree from the University of Iowa, where he studied printmaking and painting under Mauricio Lasansky.

Following his education at Ohio State University, Bob served in the Air Force in Hawaii during World War II. After earning his MFA, Bob taught as an art instructor in Iowa, then became an instructor at Ohio State University in Columbus. He moved once more to teach at Texas Tech in Lubbock, Texas. Finally, in 1949, Bob and Gennie DeWeese traveled to Bozeman, Montana after Bob was hired as an art professor at Montana State University (then Montana State College).

== Art career in Montana ==
Bob served as a professor of art at Montana State College (now Montana State University) from 1949 to 1977, where he influenced artists across Montana. During his time as a professor, he served as the chairman of exhibitions for the MSC arts department in the 1960s. He also opened a studio on Main Street, where he and his wife Gennie produced and exhibited art as well as hosting theater performances.

After his retirement as a professor emeritus, Bob continued creating art with his wife Gennie. The two were primarily painters and printmakers, and they were credited with influencing the modernist movement developing in Montana and encouraging new artists.

== Art style ==
In general, Bob DeWeese was a Modernist artist. During his studies at the University of Iowa, Bob DeWeese became interested in lithography, particularly the “technical and expressive potential of printmaking." During the 1950s and 1960s, Bob focused on intaglio, or etching. In the 1980s, he expanded his interest to include monoprints. However, he worked with a wide variety of mediums and styles throughout his lifetime, including drawing, painting, and mixed media constructions. His work was a mixture of realist modernism and abstract expressionism that drew from such artists as Kooning, Matisse, and Picasso.

== Personal life ==
In 1946, Bob married Gennie DeWeese (née Genevieve Adams). In 1947, Gennie gave birth to the couple’s first child, Cathie, in Iowa City. Their second child, Jan, was born in Columbus, Ohio. After the couple moved to Bozeman, they had three more children: Gretchen, Tina, and Josh.

In Bozeman, the DeWeeses initially lived in a small white brick house on Church Street and Bob rented a studio on Main Street. The house and studio became a meeting place for the Montana art and intellectual community, including Robert Pirsig, author of Zen and the Art of Motorcycle Maintenance. In 1965, the DeWeeses purchased land in Cottonwood Canyon and built a new house; this house was visited by Pirsig and his son in 1968 as recounted in Zen and the Art of Motorcycle Maintenace. Following Bob’s retirement in 1977, the family turned the home into a gallery and held gallery openings for artists in the community.

== Awards and recognition ==
Bob and Gennie DeWeese received the Montana Governor’s Award for the Arts in 1995. In addition, the Robert and Gennie DeWeese Art Gallery at Bozeman High School was named after the couple. In 1995, a retrospective of the couple’s work was shown at the Billings Yellowstone Art Museum, Missoula Art Museum and Holter Museum in Helena. Following the exhibit, “the museums put many of the couple’s works in their permanent collections.”

The couple is also recognized for their contributions to the development of public art galleries in Montana, including the Emerson Center for the Arts in Bozeman and the Custer County Art Center, as well as their dedication to teaching and assisting new artists. Much of their work is still held in major collections of Montana contemporary art museums.

== Later years ==
Bob DeWeese died on November 20, 1990, from bone marrow disease in Billings. He continued making art up until his death.
