= Bob DeWeese (basketball) =

American basketball player

Personal information
- Born: November 8, 1915 Brookston, Indiana, U.S.
- Died: April 25, 1991 (aged 75) Lafayette, Indiana, U.S.
- Listed height: 5 ft 11 in (1.80 m)
- Listed weight: 160 lb (73 kg)

Career information
- High school: Brookston (Brookston, Indiana)
- College: Gallagher Business School (1933–1937)
- Position: Guard

Career history
- 1937: Kankakee Gallagher Trojans

Robert Joseph DeWeese (November 8, 1915 – April 25, 1991) was an American professional basketball player. He played in the National Basketball League for the Kankakee Gallagher Trojans in just two games during the 1937–38 season and averaged 1.0 point per game. DeWeese served in the United States Navy during World War II.
