= Zen and the Art of Motorcycle Maintenance =

1974 book by Robert M. Pirsig

Zen and the Art of Motorcycle Maintenance: An Inquiry into Values
- First edition
- Author: Robert M. Pirsig
- Language: English
- Genre: Philosophical fiction, Autobiographical novel
- Published: 1974 (William Morrow and Company)
- Publication place: United States
- Media type: Print (hardcover and paperback)
- Pages: 418 pp
- ISBN: 0-688-00230-7
- OCLC: 673595
- Dewey Decimal: 917.3/04/920924 B
- LC Class: CT275.P648 A3 1974
- Followed by: Lila: An Inquiry into Morals

Zen and the Art of Motorcycle Maintenance: An Inquiry into Values is a book by Robert M. Pirsig first published in 1974. A work of fictionalized autobiography, it became an instant bestseller. It is the first of Pirsig's texts in which he discusses his concept of Quality.

The title is an apparent play on the title of the 1948 book Zen in the Art of Archery by Eugen Herrigel. In its introduction, Pirsig explains that, despite its title, "it should in no way be associated with that great body of factual information relating to orthodox Zen Buddhist practice. It's not very factual on motorcycles, either."

Pirsig received 121 rejections before a publisher finally accepted the book for publication—and he did so thinking it would never generate a profit. It ended up selling 50,000 copies in the first three months and more than 5 million since.

== Structure ==
The book is a fictionalized autobiography of a 17-day journey that Pirsig made with his Honda CB77 motorcycle from Minnesota to Northern California along with his son Chris in 1968. The story of this journey is recounted in a first-person narrative, although the author is not identified. Father and son are also accompanied, for the first nine days of the journey, by close friends John and Sylvia Sutherland, with whom they part ways in Montana.

The journey is punctuated by numerous philosophical discussions, referred to as Chautauquas by the author, on topics including epistemology, the history of philosophy, and the philosophy of science.

Many of these discussions are accompanied by information concerning the narrator's own past self, who is referred to in the third person as Phaedrus (after Plato's dialogue). Phaedrus, a teacher of creative and technical writing at Montana State College, became engrossed in the question of what defines good writing, and what in general defines good, or "Quality", which he understands similar to Tao. Phaedrus's philosophical investigations eventually caused him to become insane, and he was subjected to electroconvulsive therapy, which permanently changed his personality.

Towards the end of the book, Phaedrus's strong and unorthodox personality, presented as dangerous to the narrator, becomes more apparent and the narrator is reconciled with his past.

== Writing ==
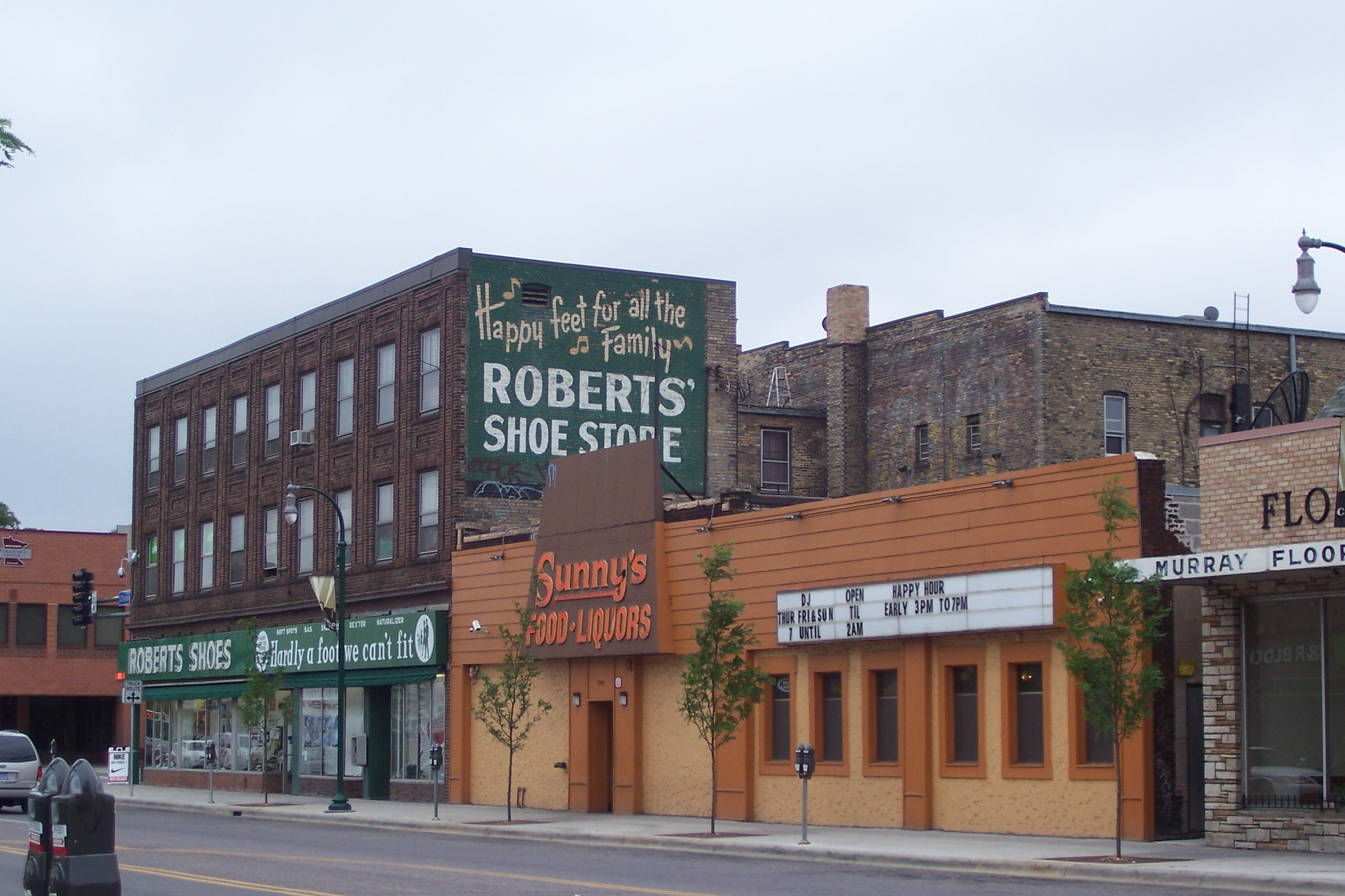
Roberts Shoes on the corner of Chicago and Lake in Minneapolis, where Pirsig lived while writing Zen and the Art of Motorcycle Maintenance.

Pirsig wrote most of the book while living above a shoe store in south Minneapolis, while working as a tech writer for Honeywell. In a 1974 interview with National Public Radio, Pirsig stated that the book took him four years to write. During two of these years, Pirsig continued working at his job of writing computer manuals. This caused him to adopt an unorthodox schedule, awakening very early and writing Zen from 2 a.m. until 6 a.m., then eating and going to his day job. He would sleep during his lunch break and then go to bed around 6 in the evening. Pirsig joked that his co-workers noticed that he was "a lot less perky" than everyone else.

== Themes ==
=== Philosophical content ===
In the book, the narrator describes the "romantic" consideration of life of his friend, John Sutherland, who chooses not to learn how to maintain his expensive new motorcycle. John simply hopes for the best with his bike, and when problems do occur he often becomes frustrated and is forced to rely on professional mechanics to repair it. In contrast, the "classical" narrator has an older motorcycle which he is usually able to diagnose and repair himself through the use of rational problem-solving skills. For example, when the narrator and his friends come into Miles City, Montana, he notices the engine running roughly, a possible indication that the fuel/air mixture is too rich. The next day he notes that both spark plugs are black, confirming a rich mixture. He recognizes that the higher elevation is causing the engine to run rich. The narrator rectifies this by installing new jets and adjusting the valves, and the engine runs well again.

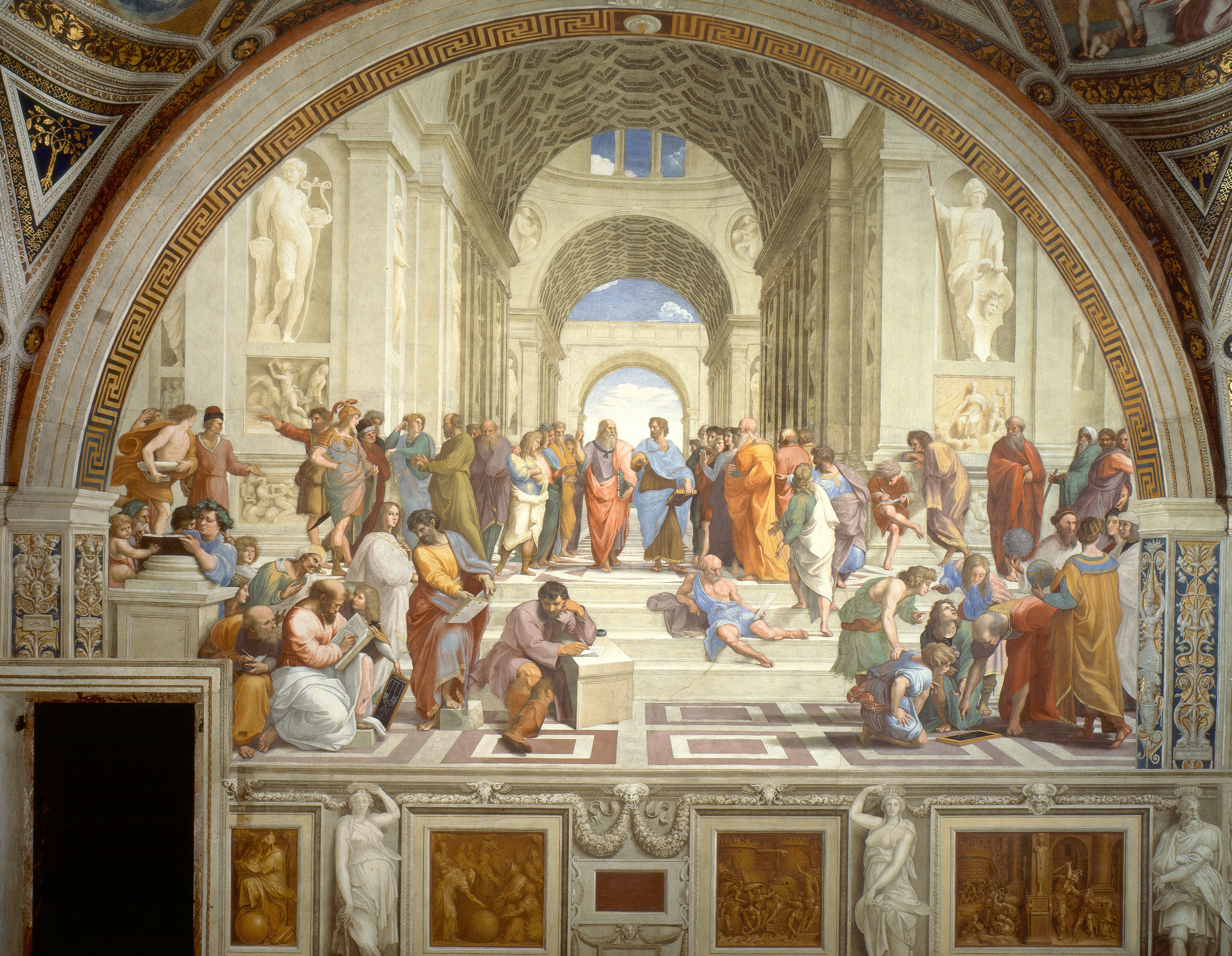
The School of Athens in the Vatican - Ancient Greek philosophy depicted by Raphael

The narrator examines the modern pursuit of "Pure Truths", claiming it derives from the work of early Greek philosophers who were establishing the concept of truth in opposition to the force of "The Good". He argues that although rational thought may find a truth (or The Truth) it may never be applicable completely and universally to every individual's experience; therefore what is needed is a method of thought that is more inclusive and has a wider range of application. He makes a case that originally the Greeks did not distinguish between "Quality" and "Truth"—they were one and the same, arete—and that the divorce was, in fact, artificial (though needed at the time) and is now a source of much frustration and unhappiness in the world, particularly overall dissatisfaction with modern life.

The narrator explains that he seeks a perception of the world that embraces both the rational and the romantic, and that he seeks to demonstrate that rationality and Zen-like "being in the moment" can harmoniously coexist. He suggests such a combination of rationality and romanticism can potentially result in a greater quality of life.

It has been noted that Pirsig's romantic/classical dichotomy resembles Nietzsche's Dionysian/Apollonian dichotomy as described in The Birth of Tragedy. For example, in his book The Person of the Therapist, Edward Smith writes, "In his popular novel ... Pirsig also addressed the Apollonian and Dionysian worldviews, naming them respectively classical understanding and romantic understanding."

=== The self and relationships ===
Beverly Gross (1984) writes that Pirsig is seeking a synthesis of "the normal, everyday, functioning self with the person given to extremes, excesses, dizzying heights, obsessions—our crazy self with our sane self, the greatness in us with our ordinariness". The exceptional in the narrator is represented by Phaedrus, who, despite the narrator's attempt to keep him in the past, becomes a major item of his thought toward the book's end, threatening the narrator's stability and relationship with his son. However, the narrator's difficulties with his son during the journey also question whether surrendering parts of himself in exchange for "sanity" has even helped this relationship. Gross writes, "He relates to mechanical things, not to people. There is beauty in his recognition that personality inheres in motorcycles, riding gloves; there is sadness and sickness in his removal from the personality of people, his own most notably". The Chautauquas, which emphasize the narrator's tendency toward solitary thought and over-analysis, may reflect his avoidance of the problems before him: his relationships and the resurrection of Phaedrus. To the extent that the narrator denies Phaedrus, the Chautauquas are practical, but when he decides that he will admit himself to hospital again, he realizes the undeniable presence of Phaedrus in him, and the Chautauquas are given over to those more abstruse topics.

=== Gumption traps ===
According to the narrator, a gumption trap is an event or mindset that can cause a person to lose enthusiasm and become discouraged from starting or continuing a project. The word "gumption" denotes a combination of common sense, shrewdness, and a sense of initiative. Although the last of these traits is the primary victim of the "gumption trap," the first two suffer indirectly in that a reduction in initiative results in a reduction in constructive activity and therefore inhibits one's development of the first two traits. Pirsig goes on to inform his readers that the "trap" portion of the term refers to the positive feedback loop that the event or mindset creates: the reduction in the person's enthusiasm and initiative decreases both the person's likelihood of success in that project and the degree of success likely, thus doubly affecting the expected outcome of the person's efforts. The usual result further discourages the person, whether it be a mere lack of success or a bigger outright failure complete with embarrassment and loss of the resources initially invested.

The specific term "gumption trap" was invented by Pirsig, and the associated concept plays an important part in the practical application of his Metaphysics of Quality.

The narrator defines two types of gumption traps: setbacks, which he sees as arising from external/"exogenous" events, and hang-ups, which he describes as the product of internal/"endogenous" factors such as a poor fit between one's psychological state and the requirements of a project.

The nature of setbacks can vary considerably. For example, a minor setback might result from a minor injury. Worse setbacks include the lack of knowledge that a certain procedural action or condition is necessary for a project's success: If one attempts to keep working despite the lack of knowledge that this obstacle exists (let alone how to deal with it), one's lack of progress may prompt one to take long breaks from the project, to focus one's attention on other endeavors, or even to lose interest in the project altogether. Pirsig suggests preventing these kinds of gumption traps by being slow and meticulous, taking notes that might help later, and troubleshooting in advance (e.g., by laying out the requirements for one's project in logical and/or conceptual order and looking for procedural problems ranging from unaccounted-for prerequisites to gaps in one's instructions or plans).

Hang-ups stem from internal factors that can get in the way of starting or completing a project. Examples of such hang-ups include anxiety, boredom, impatience, and the failure (often borne of excessive egotism) to realize that a) one might not have all the information necessary to succeed and/or b) certain aspects of the problem might be more or less important than one believes. Dealing with hang-ups can be as simple as reducing hyperfocus on a specific aspect of a problem by taking a short break from working on the problem or that specific aspect of it.

Pirsig notes several aspects of hang-ups.

- Affective (i.e. receptive or dynamic) understanding or value traps: these can be described generally as an inability or reluctance to re-evaluate notions due to a commitment to previous values. On the whole these types of issues can be addressed by (1) rediscovering facts as they arise; (2) recognizing that the facts are available and apparent; (3) deliberately slowing down to allow unstructured processing of information; and (4) reassessing the weight attached to the current knowledge.

- Egotism may encourage one to believe misleading information or disbelieve a potentially inconvenient fact. Appropriate recourses include humility, modesty, attentiveness and skepticism.
- Anxiety may preclude the confidence necessary to begin a project or the self-assurance needed to patiently work through a project systematically. Appropriate recourses include research, study and preparation prior to beginning the project; detailing the anticipated steps required to accomplish the task; and understanding the personhood and fallibility of professionals.
- Boredom may cause sloppy work and inattention to detail. Appropriate recourses include taking a break to allow interest in the project to rebuild or ritualizing common practices. Pirsig notes that at the first sign of boredom, it is important to stop work immediately.
- Impatience, like boredom, may cause sloppy work and inattention to detail. Appropriate recourses include allowing indefinite time for the project and value flexibility to rediscover aspects of the project.

- Cognitive understanding or truth traps: these can be described as misunderstanding the feedback of a given action.

- Reliance on yes-no duality may cause misinterpretation of results. Pirsig notes the concept of mu and suggests the answer to a particular question may indicate that the question does not match the situation. An appropriate recourse may be to reconsider the context of the inquiry.

- Psychomotor behavior or muscle traps: these concern the interaction of the environment, machinist and machine.

- Inadequate tools may result in a feeling of frustration. Appropriate recourses include proper equipment acquisition.
- Environmental factors may result in frustration including inadequate lighting, temperature extremes and physically uncomfortable positions.
- Muscular insensitivity or lack of proprioception may cause a disproportionate amount of force to be applied to a material that results in frustration. Misunderstanding of different tolerances of various materials may result in broken parts or inadequate tension.

== Reception and legacy ==
At the time of its publication, Christopher Lehmann-Haupt, in his book review for The New York Times, wrote,

I now regret that I lack the expertise in philosophy to put Mr. Pirsig's ideas to a proper test, for this book may very well be a profoundly important one—a great one even—full of insights into our most perplexing contemporary dilemmas. I just don't know. But whatever its true philosophical worth, it is intellectual entertainment of the highest order.

Since then, Zen and the Art of Motorcycle Maintenance has become the best-selling philosophy book of all time.

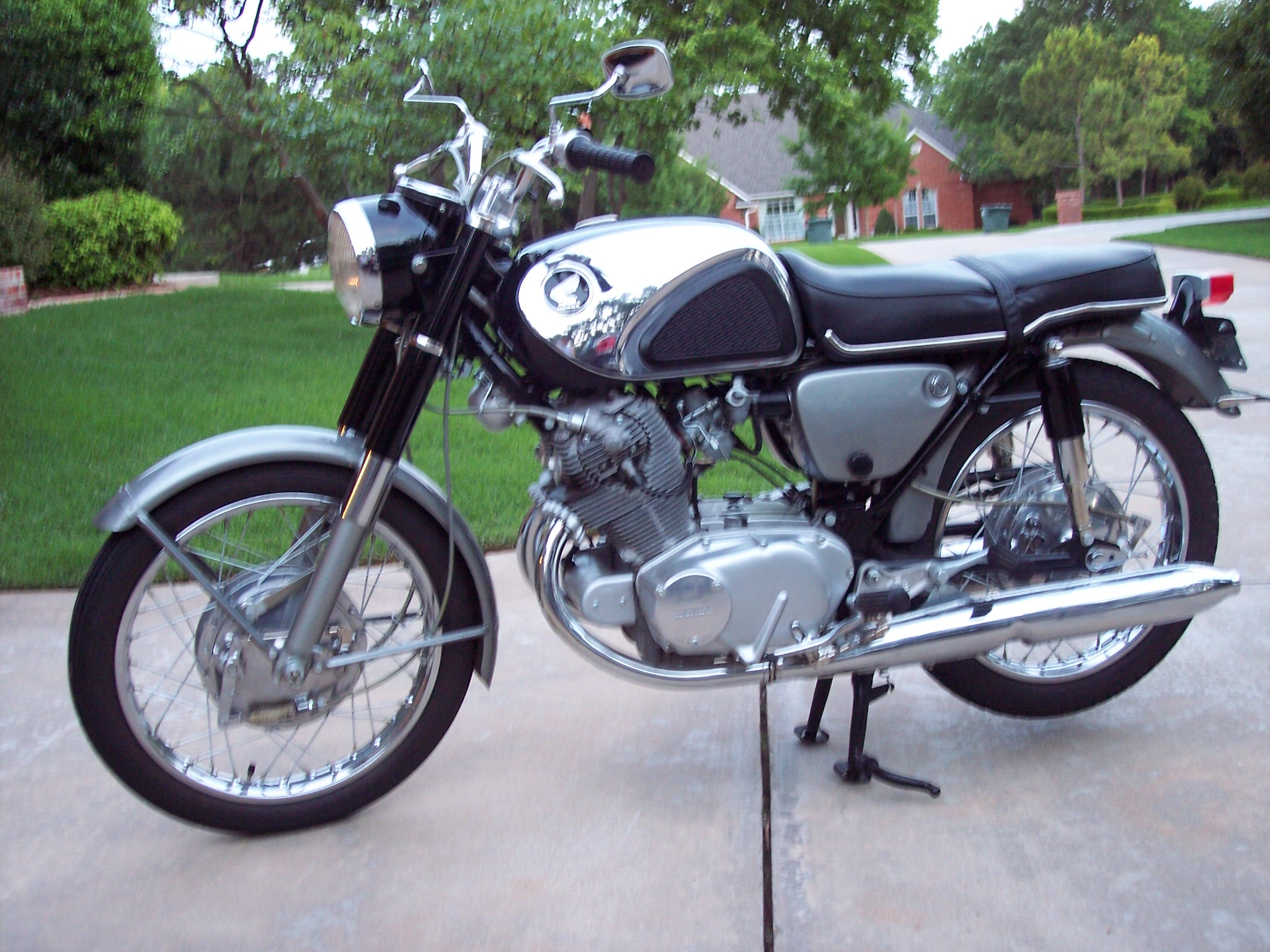
A 1967 Honda CB77 Super Hawk, similar to the 1966 model Pirsig rode.

Pirsig's 1966 Honda CB77 Super Hawk, on which the 1968 ride with his son Chris which inspired the book was taken, was acquired by the Smithsonian's National Museum of American History, along with the book's original manuscript, a signed first edition, and tools and clothing from the ride. In April 2024 the motorcycle went on public display for the first time, in the museum's largest exhibition "America on the Move", along with Pirsig's manual typewriter and an Apple II computer to which he made upgrades. The exhibition celebrates the book's continued popularity, a half-century after its release, and how its tale of "taking to the road" is "a recurring theme in the nation’s mythology and a demonstration of rugged American individualism."

In May 2024, the book was the subject of BBC Radio 4's series Archive on 4, to mark the fiftieth anniversary of its publication.

== See also ==
- Lila: An Inquiry into Morals
- Quality (philosophy)
- Pirsig's metaphysics of Quality
