= Laverda Jota =

Italian motorcycle

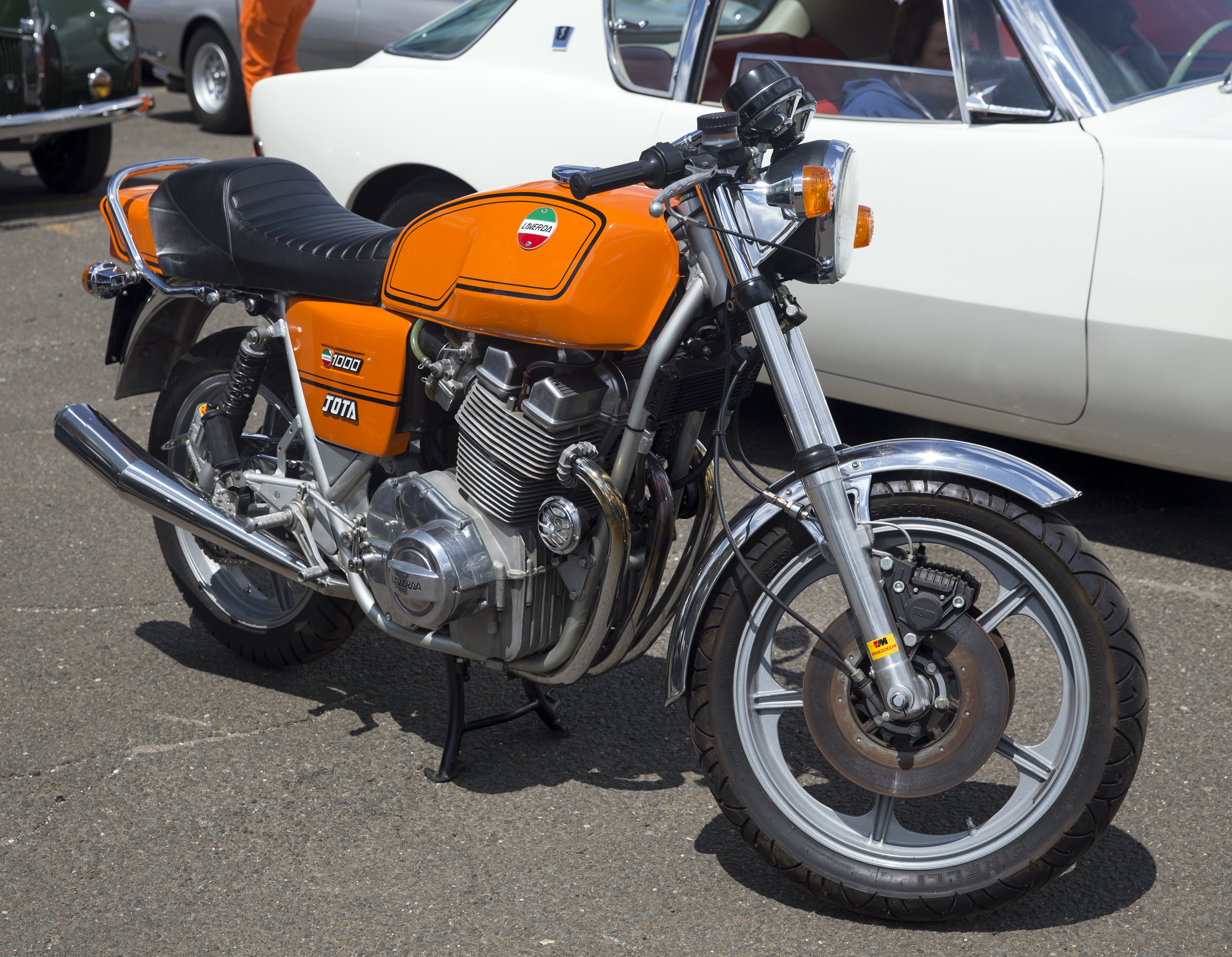
- 1976 Laverda Jota 1000
- Manufacturer: Laverda
- Production: 1976–1982
- Engine: 981 cc DOHC air-cooled I3

Laverda Jota is a Laverda 1000cc Italian motorcycle suggested by the importers Slater Bros. of Collington, near Bromyard, Herefordshire, England. Based on the existing 1973-1981 Laverda 3C model that made 85 hp (63 kW) at 7,250 rpm and reaching speeds of more than 210 km/h (130 mph), the new Jota made a big impression in 1976. It is named after the jota, a Spanish dance in triple time.

The Laverda Jota model ran from 1976 through to 1982. The Jota is powered by a 981 cc, DOHC, air-cooled inline triple and had a dry weight of 234 kg (515 lb). Originally fitted with a crankshaft with 180° crankpin phasing and ignition timing on the right hand side of the engine till 1980. Then in 1981 the ignition timing, which was by then electronic, was moved to the left side. In 1982 the Jota 120° was released, this smoother-running engine had the crankpin phasing set to 120°.

Early Jotas had a 123, then 140 Watt, Bosch alternator, which was barely enough to keep pace with discharge with the lights on. The Series 2 Jota (180° as well as 120° versions) onwards had 260 watt Nippon Denso alternator.

In Australasia, the UK and South Africa the Jota had high lift camshafts, high compression pistons and less restrictive exhausts. In some European countries (France and Switzerland) Jotas had considerably milder tuning (mild "A12" cams, flat top low compression pistons, smaller valves, and strangled exhausts). In the United States, a version with an 1116 cc engine called the 1200 Jota America became available beginning in 1978. The larger engine helped ameliorate the power losses resulting from stricter emissions regulations in that market, although power did drop to 73 hp (54 kW). The price was also five percent lower than for the earlier Jota 1000.

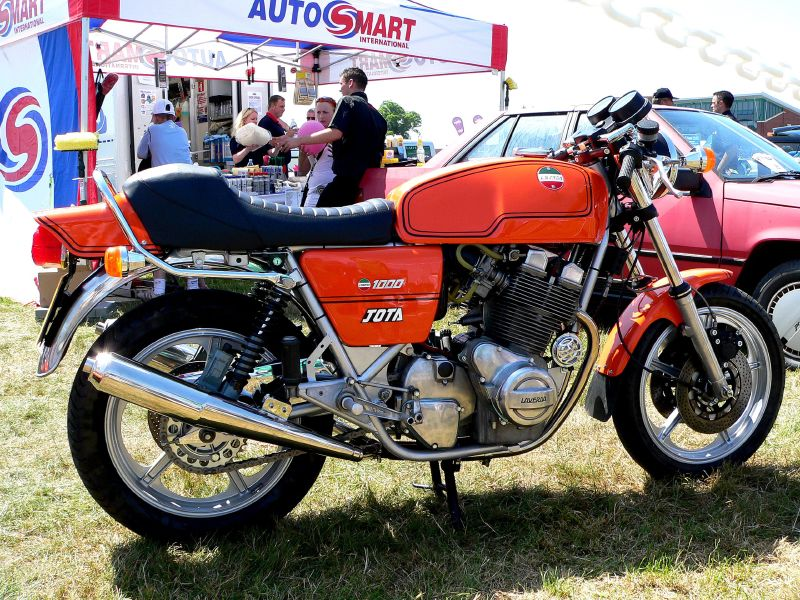

== Notes ==
Records
Preceded by Ducati SuperSport	Fastest production motorcycle 1976–1977	Succeeded by MV Agusta Monza
