= Laverda 1000 =

Italian 1,000 cc DOHC triple motorcycle

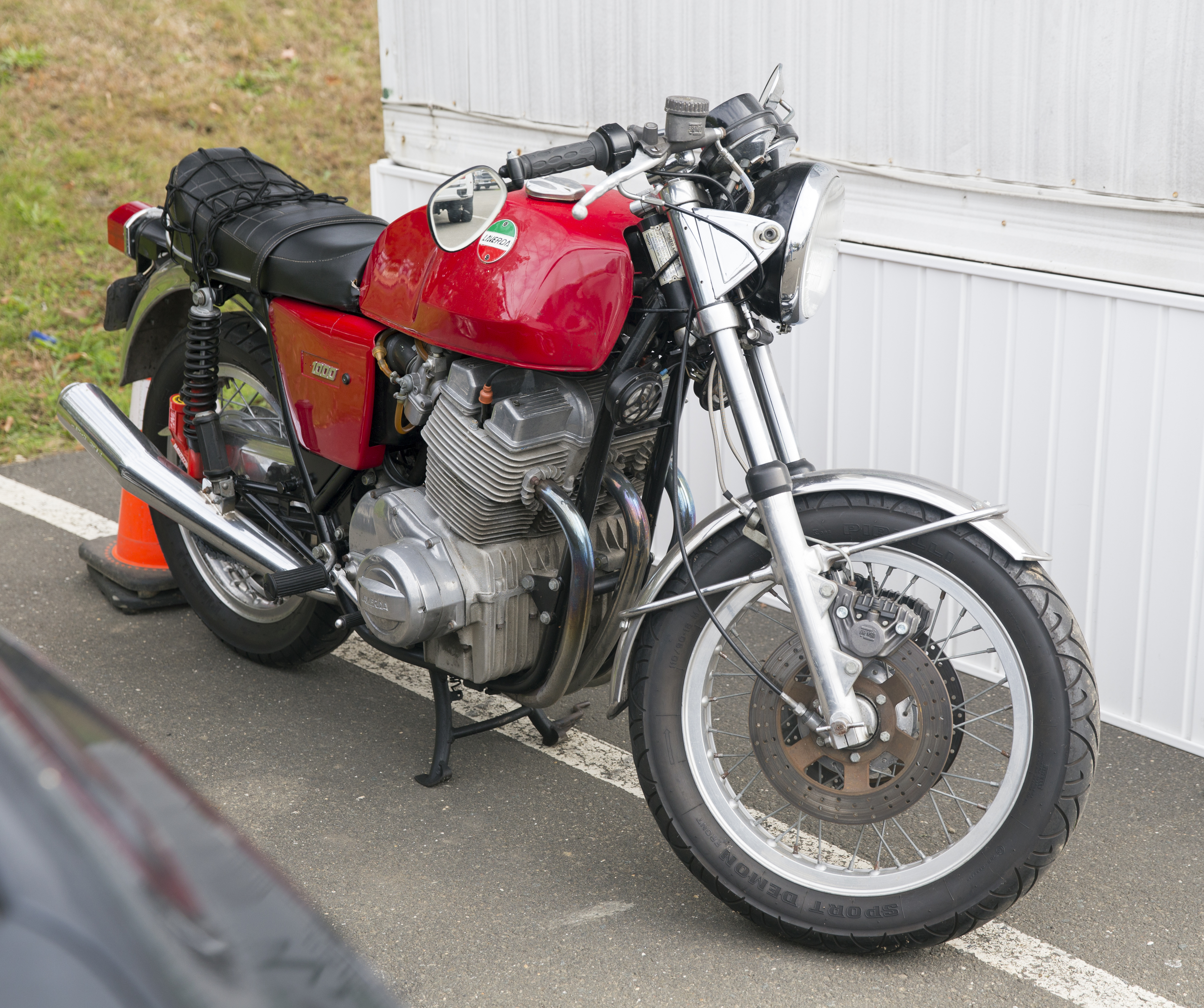
- 1974 Laverda 1000 3C
- Manufacturer: Laverda
- Production: 1973-1988
- Engine: 981 cc (59.9 cu in) air cooled DOHC triple
- Bore / stroke: 75 mm × 74 mm (3.0 in × 2.9 in)
- Compression ratio: 10:1 (Jota)
- Top speed: 130 mph (210 km/h) (3CL); 140 mph (230 km/h) (Jota)
- Power: 81 bhp (60 kW) @ 7,200 rpm (3CL); 90 bhp (67 kW) @ 7,600 rpm (Jota)
- Transmission: Multiplate wet clutch, 5 speed, chain drive
- Frame type: Duplex cradle
- Suspension: Front: Telescopic forks, rear swinging arm
- Wheelbase: 1,470 mm (58 in)
- Weight: 246 kg (542 lb) (Jota) (dry)

The Laverda 1000 is a series of 981 cc (59.9 cu in) air cooled DOHC triple motorcycles produced by the Italian manufacturer Laverda between 1973 and 1988. The high-performance variant, the Jota, was the fastest production motorcycle from 1976 to 1981. Approximately 7,100 triples of the various models were produced.

== Background ==
In 1969 Laverda announced their intention to produce a 1000 cc triple. General manager Massimo Laverda claimed the triple would be lighter and narrower than the recently introduced Honda CB750. A prototype was shown at the Milan Show later that year. Chief designer Luciano Zen prototype was based on the SOHC 750 twin with an extra cylinder. It retained the 750's layout of starter behind the cylinders and generator in front.

The original engine was not producing enough power so a second prototype was built in 1970 with a double overhead cam layout. The cams were driven by a belt on the right side of the engine. Due to casting difficulties, both cams were housed in separate boxes. The generator was replaced with an alternator on the end of the crankshaft. During testing there were some frame and crankshaft failures that were attributed to the rocking couple of the 120° crankshaft. The crank was changed to 180° to resolve this.

There were concerns over the longevity of the belt, and also the appearance of the belt drive was disliked by marketing. The engine was modified to drive the cams by the chain between cylinders 2 and 3 and the head casting was simplified to use a single cam-cover.

The final prototype was shown at the 1971 Milan Show. This was an all-new bike with a DOHC engine, camshafts driven by chain, and a duplex-cradle frame.

== Models ==
=== 1000 ===
Production of the triple started in late 1972 as the Laverda 1000. This model used drum brakes of Laverda's own manufacture, the front being twin leading shoe, and wire wheels with Borrani alloy rims. Soon after introduction the Ceriani forks were upgraded from 35mm to 38mm.

=== 3C ===
The 1,000 was updated in 1974 and designated the 3C. Initially a single Brembo front disc brake was fitted but was soon upgraded to twin front discs.

A high-lift cam, designated 4C, and 10:1 pistons were offered as optional extras. Around 2,300 3Cs were produced.

=== 3CL ===
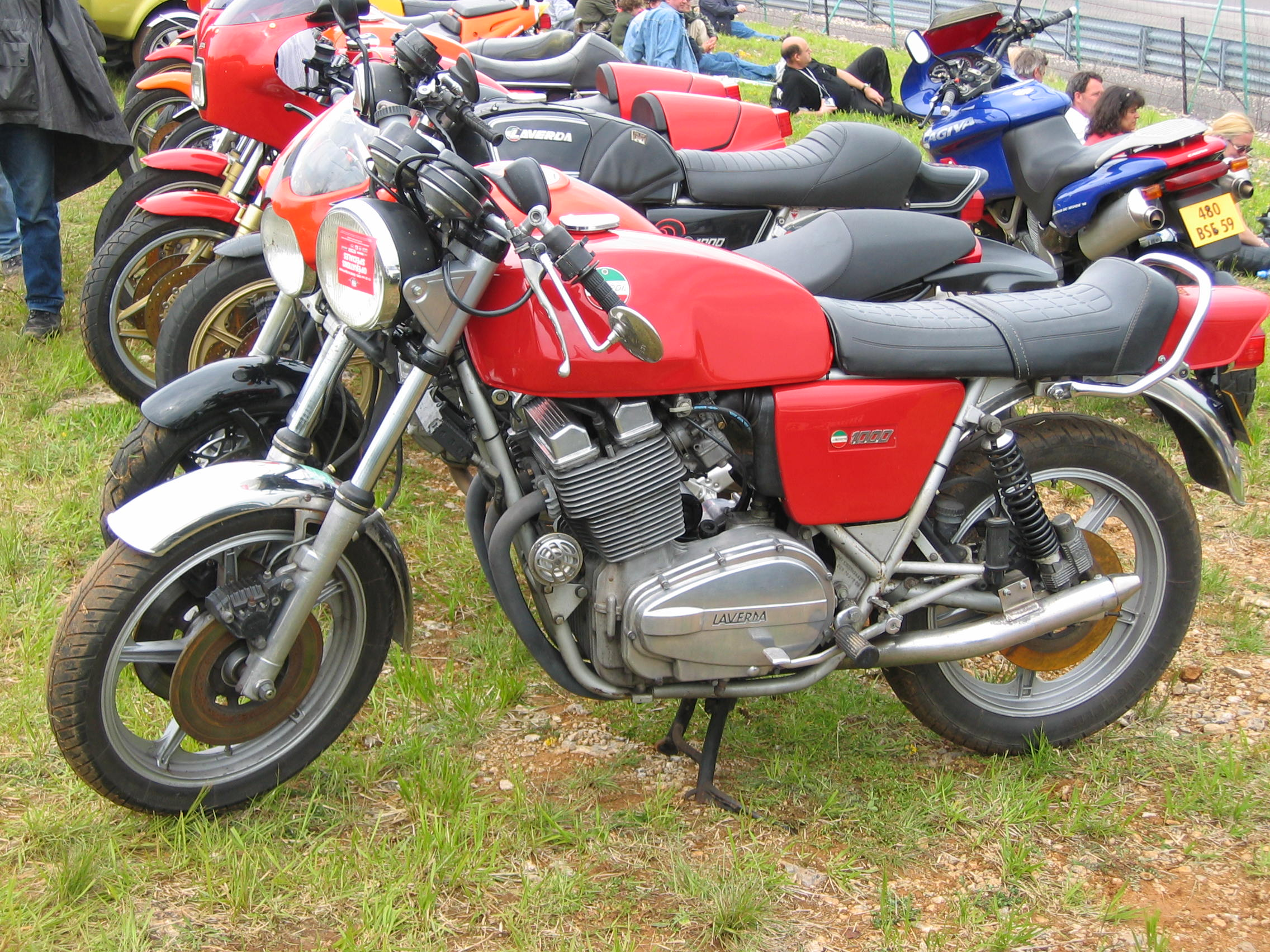
Laverda 3CL

A further update occurred in 1975 with Laverda manufactured cast alloy wheels being fitted and a rear disc brake. The model was now designated 3CL (L standing for lega, Italian for alloy).

The iron 'skull' insert that formed the combustion chamber was no longer fitted from 1976, leading to cracking around the valve seats on some machines. It was reintroduced in 1978, but not hardened around the valve seats, leading to valve seat erosion. To reduce engine noise, the inner main bearings were changed from rollers to ball in 1979. This led to failures and warranty claims and the bearings were changed back to rollers later that year. By 1980 the reliability problems were resolved.

==== Jarama ====
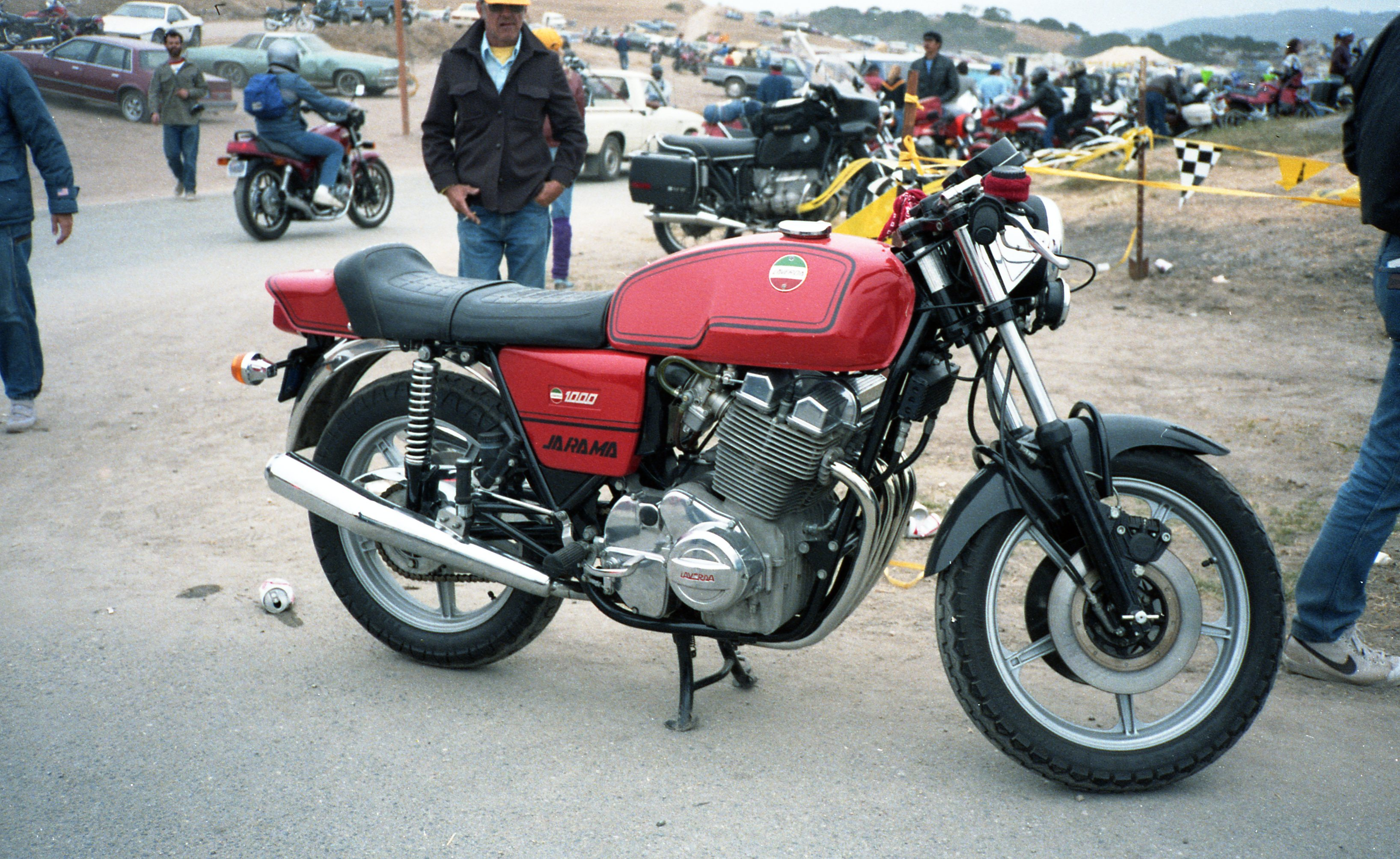
Laverda Jarama

The US version of the 3CL was designated the Jarama and had a left-foot gearchange, reflectors, a quieter exhaust system and a more upright riding position. Sales were poor in the US and some were shipped to the UK where they were sold at a discount. Some of these UK imports were converted to Jota specification and are known in the trade as Jarotas.

=== Jota ===
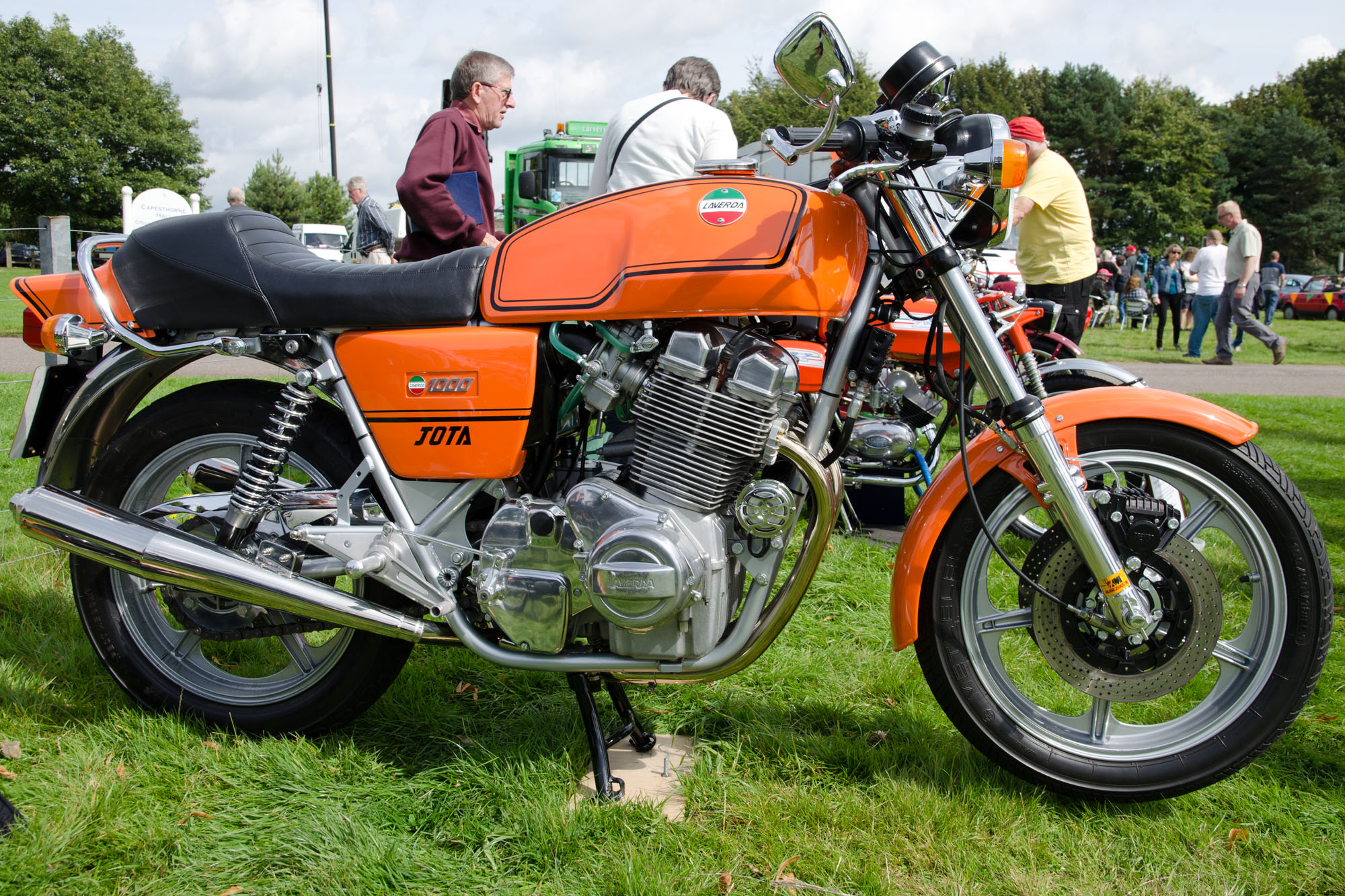
1981 Laverda Jota

The UK importers, Slater Brothers, were offering 3Cs fitted with the racing 4C cams, 10:1 pistons, fork yokes from the SFC750 endurance racing twins to give steeper steering and an exhaust system designed in conjunction with Tim Healey, the Ariel Square Four specialist. These bikes were designated 3CE (E for England). The model suffered from vibration at higher revs.

Massimo Laverda agreed to supply factory-built 3CEs to the UK only in 1976. The model acquired the name Jota and was the first production bike to be timed at more than 140 mph. Jotas won the UK production racing championship in 1976, 78, 79 and 80.

The model was imported into the US in 1977. These model were fitted with left-foot gearchange via a crossover linkage.

A new frame was fitted in 1978 with the rear shock absorbers more forward leading. This frame was shared with the newly introduced 1,200 models. Marzocchi forks replaced the Ceriani forks previously fitted.

A more powerful Nippon Denso alternator was fitted in 1981 which necessitated moving the ignition pick-ups from the right to left end of the crankshaft. The crankcases and primary cover were changed to facilitate a future change to left-hand gearchange and hydraulically operated clutch fitted. The cylinder head was also revised and larger valves fitted. US models were fitted with softer cams and lower compression ratio in this year.

==== Jota 120 ====
The triple was produced with a 180° crankshaft, with the pistons in the outer cylinders rising and falling at the same time. To give the engine a more even firing cycle and better balance, the crankshaft throws were changed to 120° in 1982, giving rise to the Jota 120. and a hydraulic clutch fitted. The gearchange was now on the left side and close-ratio gears were fitted.

=== RGS ===
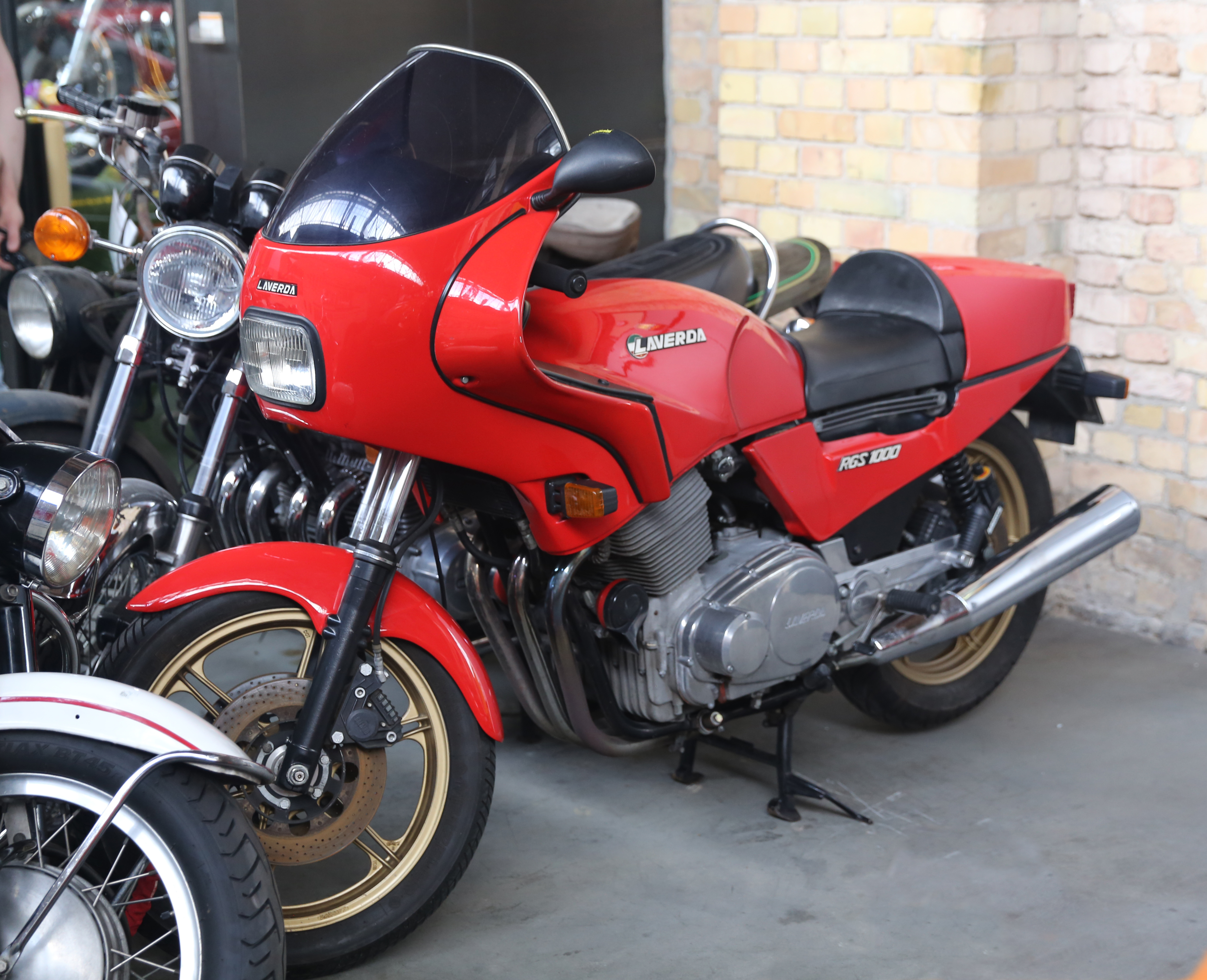
Laverda RGS with Executive-style fairing extensions

By the early 1980s Laverda was in financial trouble with the triples having to compete with cheaper, multi-cylinder machines from Japan. Being a small company unable to compete with the volume manufacturers from Japan, Laverda chose to aim at the high quality market. With this in mind, the triple was evolved into the RGS which was launched in 1982. First shown at the 1981 Milan Show, it powered by the revised 120° engine and had new cycle parts. A new frame was developed and the machine had flowing bodywork finished in red. The petrol filler cap was mounted on the front of the fairing. To protect the rider from vibration, the engine was rubber mounted.

==== RGS Executive ====
An executive variant was offered with 'bat wing' extensions to the fairing to keep the riders hands dry and integrated luggage bags.

==== RGS Corsa ====
Produced at the request of the UK importers, Three Cross Motorcycles, the RGS Corsa was finished in black and was a high-performance version of the RGS. Claimed power output was 95 bhp. The engine had higher compression forged pistons, a gas flowed head and larger inlet valves. Braking was updated with Brembo floating discs and goldline callipers. Around 200 examples of the Corsa were produced.

=== RGA ===
The RGA was introduced as a cut down version of the RGS. It had a different seat, tank handlebars and a bikini fairing.

==== RGA Jota ====
The RGA Jota was a sportier version of the RGA sold mainly in the UK and Germany. The model employed the same engine as the RGA but an optional 'race kit' introduced Jota 120 camshafts, high compression piston, gas-flowed head, revised airbox and a new exhaust.

==== RGA Jota Special ====
Produced by the UK importers, Three Cross Motorcycles, the model had an RGS Corsa specification engine and a fairing with two round headlights.

=== SFC ===
Introduced in 1985 as a replacement of the RGS, the SFC had revised bodywork finished in red, upgraded brakes and suspension and different instruments. The high-performance-engine from the Corsa was used. The machine had the frame painted in gold, as were the Marzocchi M1-R air-assist forks. Marzocchi remote-reservoir shocks were fitted on the rear. Oscam three-spoke cast wheels were fitted, also finished in gold. The revised bodywork, alloy swinging arm, wheels and lightweight forks gave a significant weight saving over the Corsa. At the request of the German importers, Moto Witt, some German models were finished in black and had wire wheels. The SFC could be ordered with a race kit fitted, which consisted of a race cam, 36 mm carburettors and a close ratio gearbox.

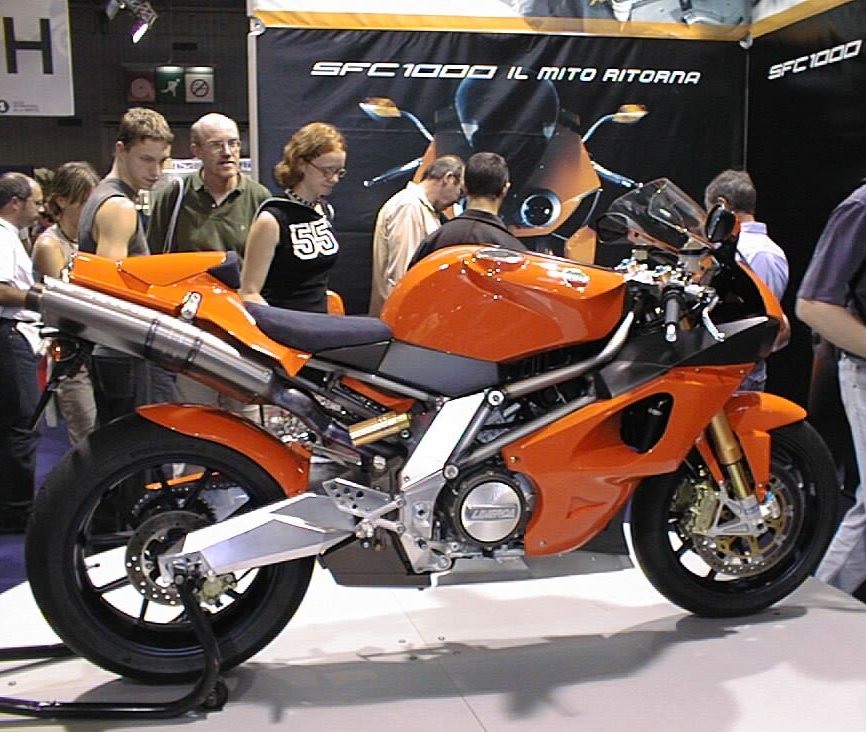
2002 Laverda SFC 1000 prototype

Laverda was taken over by Aprilia and at the 2002 Bologna Motor Show a prototype of a new Laverda SFC 1000 was shown. The bike was based on the v twin Aprilia RSV Mille but was never put into production.

== Technical details ==
The air-cooled DOHC used the latest (at the time) cylinder head design with a narrow 40° valve angle. Tappet adjustment was by bucket and shim. The crankshaft was a built up item with four roller main bearings with a ball bearing on the timing side and an outrigger roller in the primary cover. Big ends also used roller bearings. Iron 'skulls' were cast into the alloy head to form the combustion chambers and the alloy cylinders used steel liners.

Fuel was fed through three 32 mm Dell'Orto carburettors. Ignition was by Bosch electronic ignition.

The engine was redesigned in 1981 by Giuseppe Bocchi, who had been an associate of Fabio Taglioni. To give the engine a more even firing cycle and better balance, the crankshaft throws were changed to 120°. The gearchange was changed to the left side on the 120° engine and the gearbox dogs were strengthened.

A triplex chain took power to the multi-plate wet clutch and 5 speed gearbox.

A duplex cradle frame was used. Suspension was by front telescopic forks and rear swinging arm with twin shock absorbers. Brakes were initially drums but later changed to twin front and single rear discs.

== See also ==
- Laverda 1200
