= Healey (automobile) =

The surname Healey is used variously in the automotive industry:

People

- Donald Healey (1898–1988), British rally driver & automotive engineer
- Geoffrey Healey (1922–1994), British car designer, son of Donald

Manufacturers

- Donald Healey Motor Company (1946–1953), British car manufacturer founded by Donald Healey in Warwick UK
  - Healey (1946–1954) various models using a 2443 cc Riley engine built at Warwick
  - Nash-Healey (1951–1954), a joint venture with Nash Motors built with a Nash engine at Warwick and marketed only in USA by Nash
- Austin-Healey (1953–1973), a joint venture with Austin/BMC/Leyland using various Austin engines
  - Austin-Healey 100(/4) & 100/6 (1953–56, 1956–1959), produced by BMC and Jensen Motors at West Bromwich UK
  - Austin-Healey Sprite (1958–1971), produced by BMC at Abingdon
  - Austin-Healey 3000 (1959–1967), produced by BMC and Jensen Motors
- Jensen-Healey (1972–1976), a joint venture with Jensen produced by Jensen Motors

Kit-car

- Hult Healey, Swedish kit-car

See also

- Healey 1000/4 (1971–1977), motorcycle built in Redditch
