= Slater Brothers =

Motorcycle importers and dealers

- Industry: Motorcycle importers and dealers
- Founded: 1970 in Collington, Herefordshire, England
- Founders: Roger Slater; Richard Slater
- Defunct: 1986
- Successor: Slater Laverda

Slater Brothers (also referred to as Slater Bros.) was a British, and later American, motorcycle dealer and importer. They are best known as the UK importers of Laverda motorcycles, and for developing high-performance versions of Laverda models, especially the Jota.

== History ==
In 1969 Roger Slater started building Vincent Motorcycles using Fritz Egli designed frames and refurbished Vincent 1,000 cc (61 cu in) v-twin engines. In an attempt to get new engines manufactured, he visit Massimo Laverda at the Laverda factory in 1970. Laverda declined but showed him a new 1000 cc engine that was in development. As a result of this meeting Slater, along with his brother Richard, formed Slater Brothers who in addition to the Vincents would import Laverdas to the UK.

By 1972 the Laverda side of the business was the main component. Although Slater had been the official Egli frame importer since 1968, in 1973 Eric Cheney built frames were used. This was the last year of manufacture of the Slater Vincents.

In 1975, Slaters were offering the 1,000 cc (61 cu in) Laverda 3C with endurance camshafts, higher compression ratio and a less restrictive exhaust. This was later manufactured by the factory as the Jota. Slaters entered a Jota in production racing and won the UK championship in 1976 and 1978. After the triple was enlarged to 1,200 cc (73 cu in) in 1977, Slaters increased power output by fitting endurance cams and the Jota exhaust. This was the basis for the factory built Laverda Mirage. Slaters also built a higher performance version of the 1200, the Laverda Formula Mirage. Laverda had introduced the 500 cc (31 cu in) Alpino in 1977 and soon after a racing version, the Formula 500 which won the 24 Horas de Montjuïc in 1978. The following year Slaters produced a road-legal version of the Formula 500, the Montjuic.

In February 1977 Slaters started importing Enfield India 350 Bullet and exhibited it at the 1977 Motorcycle Show as a Royal Enfield. This caused controversy as the ownership of the Royal Enfield name was in dispute. The bike was aimed at the 'more mature' riders but the price was expensive compared with other manufacturers 350s and there were supply and quality problems.

Massimo Laverda asked Roger Slater to take over Laverda operations in North America. After a brief stay in Canada, Slater emigrated to the US in February 1980 setting up Slater Brothers Inc in Kenwood, California and importing Laverdas.

In 1981 Slater Brothers stopped importing Enfield Indias and Laverdas into the UK. In 1982 Three Cross Motorcycles became the new Laverda importers. and later Evesham Motorcycles started importing the Enfields.

By 1985 Laverda were struggling in the US and Slater Brothers Inc closed. The following year Slater Brothers was restructured and the name changed to Slater Laverda. It was now run by Richard Slater and Mary Bufton and supplied Laverda spares to the trade and the public. Slater Laverda closed in 2021 when Slater and Bufton retired.

== Bibliography ==
- Abhi (15 March 2015). "In NZ – 1981 Laverda Formula Mirage". Bike-urious.
- Abhi (9 March 2016). "In Italy – Slater Egli-Vincent". Bike-urious.
- Chadwick, Ian (24 May 2003). "Chadwick's history of the Enfield India Bullet". www.ianchadwick.com.
- Guyony, Philippe (20 September 2016). Vincent Motorcycles: The Untold Story since 1946. Poundbury, Dorchester, England: Veloce Publishing Ltd. ISBN 978-1-84584-902-3.
- Henshaw, Peter (26 October 2020). Royal Enfield Bullet: The Complete Story. Ramsbury: The Crowood Press. ISBN 978-1-78500-748-4.
- Pullen, Greg (2021). Royal Enfield A Complete History. Ramsbury: The Crowood Press. ISBN 978-1-78500-853-5.
- Smith, Robert (3 June 2009). "The Laverda Jota 1000". Motorcycle Classics.
- Smith, Robert (13 February 2014). "Laverda Montjuic". Motorcycle Classics.
- Walker, Mick (1998). Moto Guzzi V-Twins: The Complete Story. Ramsbury, Marlborough, Wiltshire [U.K.]: Crowood Press. ISBN 978-1-86126-180-9.
- Williams, Greg (October 2003). "Roger Slater | Vintige British Enthusiast Extraordinaire". Walneck's Classic Cycle Trader. pp. 83–86.
- Woodbury, Nolan (2 January 2020). "Laverda 1200". Woodbury Moto Media.
- "An Americanized and Galvanized Brute From The Boys In Breganze". Cycle World. October 1984.
- "Profile". Slater Laverda Motorcycles. Archived from the original on 14 March 2018.
