= Fritz Egli =

Swiss motorcycle racer

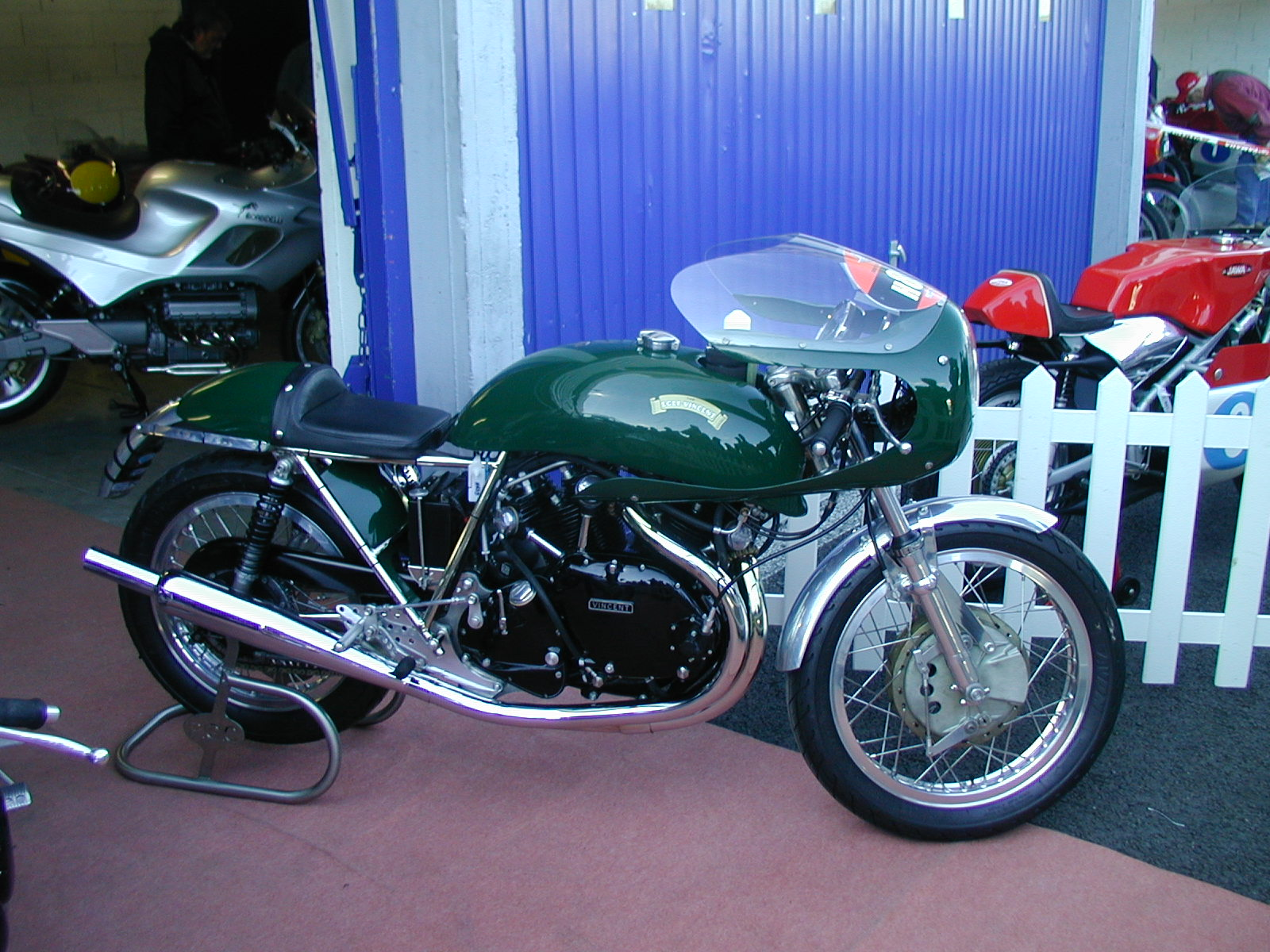
Egli-Vincent

Fritz W. Egli, (born June 30, 1937, in Zurich) is a Swiss former motorcycle racer. He is known as a motorcycle frame specialist, and engine tuner.

== History ==
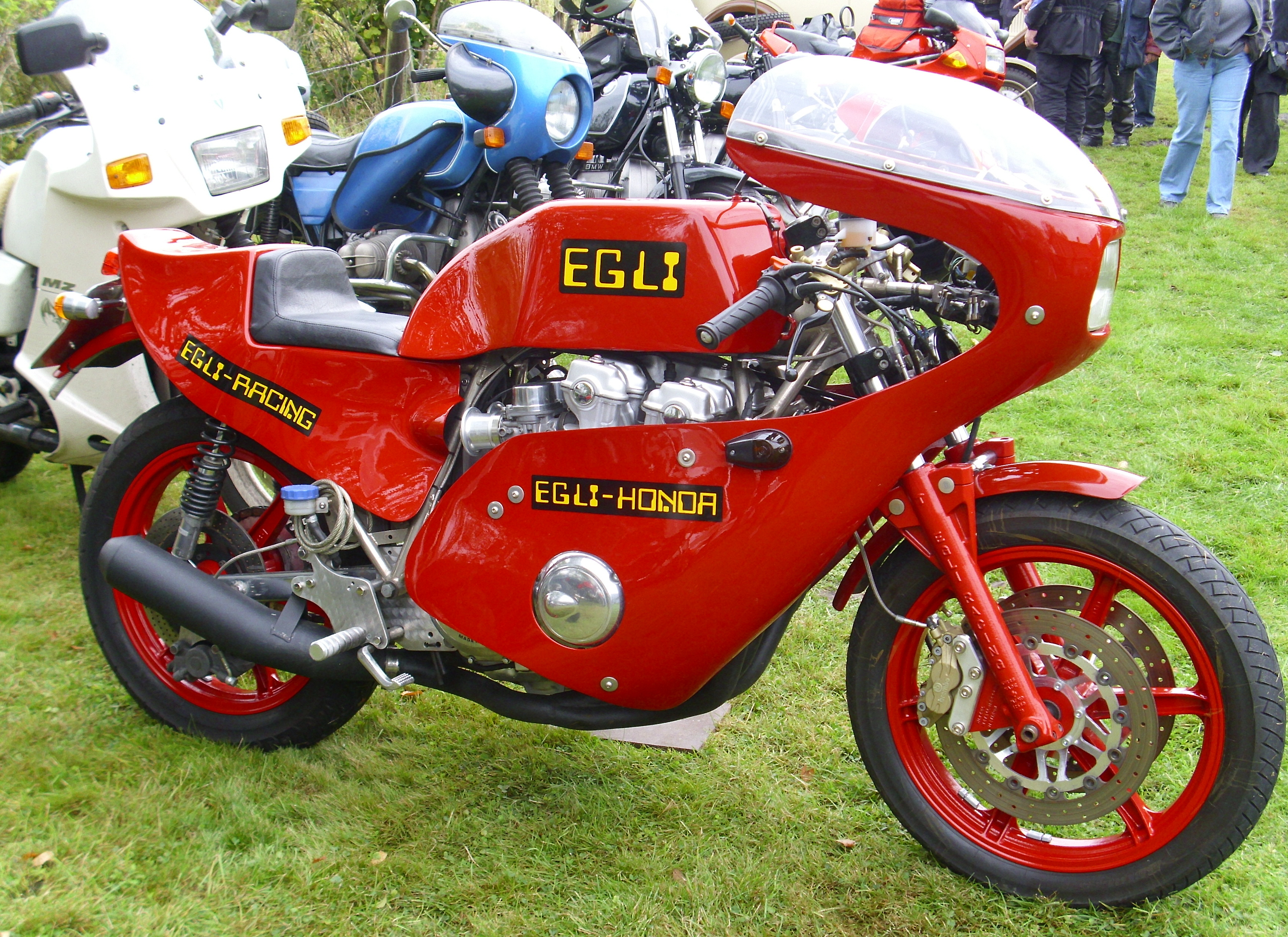
Egli-Honda

Egli founded his motorcycle speed shop in 1965. One of his first vehicles included a Vincent Black Shadow, with what was to become his signature large diameter central tube which won a 1968 motorcycle hill climb championship. He went on to become famous for his frame designs for the large Japanese motorcycle engines of the 1970s, especially the Honda CB750 Four and the first big four-stroke motorcycles of Kawasaki. His large diameter tube frame design later incorporated a honeycomb internal section which was suggested by a visiting Australian in 1979. This suggestion greatly increased the rigidity of the frame. Today, he builds frames for the Yamaha V-Max and others.

Egli took the Japanese engines, enhanced them for increased power, then placed them into his own frame designs. The main backbone pipe of his designs are about 12 cm in diameter and they use straight pipes exclusively, avoiding the "bends and curlicues" of frames such as the Norton Featherbed. Egli-framed motorcycles have following which meets annually.

Egli influenced other frame builders who went on to build their own 'straight-tube' frames, including the Healey brothers whose Healey 1000/4 motorcycle comprised an uprated Ariel Square Four engine within an Egli-type frame.

== Literature ==
- Jürgen Gassebner: Egli - The Official Book. Element book publisher, Schlierbach 2007, ISBN 3-9811662-0-5.
- Philippe Guyony: Vincent Motorcycles - The Untold Story since 1946. Veloce Publishing 2016, ISBN 978-1-845849-02-3.
