= Laverda 1200 =

Italian 1,200 cc DOHC triple motorcycle

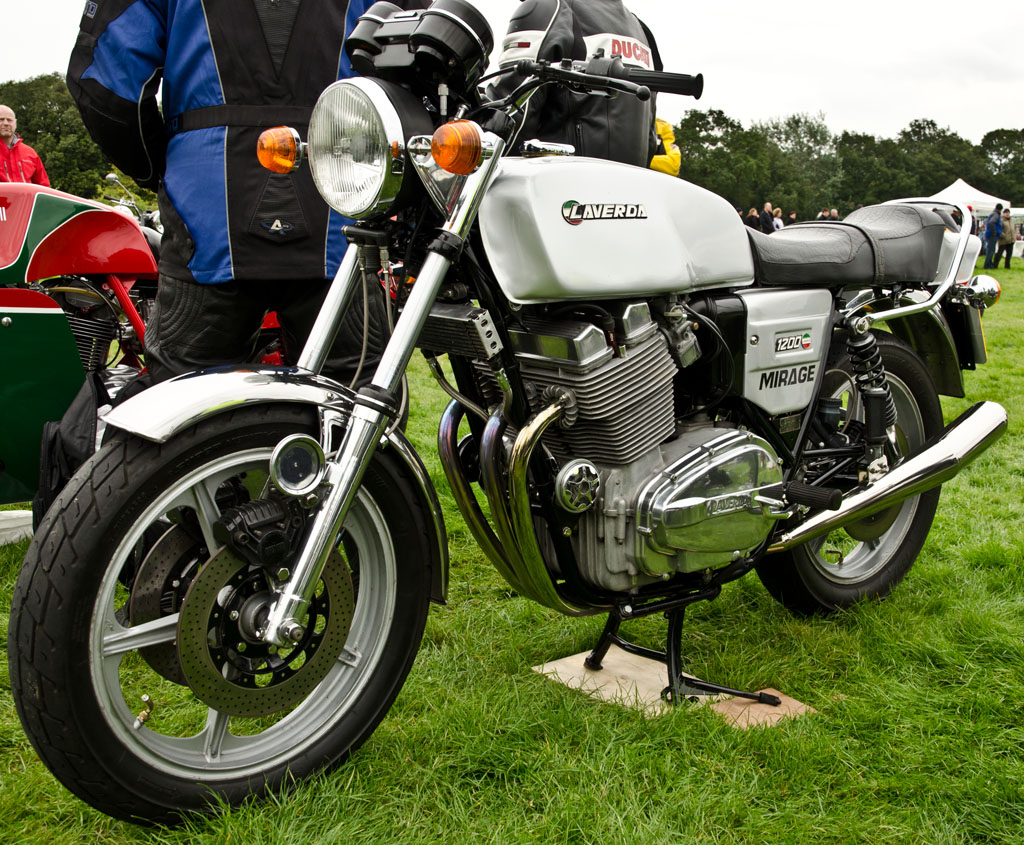
- Laverda 1200 Mirage
- Manufacturer: Laverda
- Production: 1977-1982
- Engine: 1,116 cc (68.1 cu in) air cooled DOHC triple
- Bore / stroke: 80 mm × 74 mm (3.1 in × 2.9 in)
- Compression ratio: 8.5:1
- Power: 73 bhp (54 kW) @ 7,500 rpm
- Transmission: Multiplate wet clutch, 5 speed, chain drive
- Frame type: Duplex cradle
- Suspension: Front: Telescopic forks, rear swinging arm
- Brakes: Twin discs front Single disc rear
- Wheelbase: 1,470 mm (58 in)
- Weight: 225 kg (496 lb) (dry)

The Laverda 1200 is a 1,116 cc (68.1 cu in) air cooled DOHC triple motorcycle produced by the Italian manufacturer Laverda between 1977 and 1982. The model was developed from the Laverda 1000. Austrian importer Werner Sulzbacher had had some success in production and endurance racing with triples over-bored to 1,172 cc (71.5 cu in) and 1,116 cc (68.1 cu in). Sulzbacher had put pressure on the factory to produce a 1200 cc version. With increasing noise and pollution legislation in the 1970s, especially in the US, requiring restrictive inlet and exhausts, softer cams and lower compression ratios, Laverda sought to regain performance by increasing the triple's performance by increasing displacement.

== Model variants ==
=== 1200T ===
Based on the Laverda 3CL, the 1200T was introduced in 1977. Whilst marketed as a 1200, the actual displacement was 1,116 cc (68.1 cu in). This was done by increasing the 1000s bore by 5 mm (0.20 in), from 75 to 80 mm (3.0 to 3.1 in), with the stroke remaining at 74 mm (2.9 in). The '1000' cast into the primary chaincase was machined off.

The existing 3CL twin downtube frame was modified with the rear shock absorbers more forward leading. This frame was also adopted on the 1000 cc models. Ceriani 38 mm (1.5 in) front forks were fitted. Twin 280 mm (11 in) Brembo discs were fitted on the front with a single disc of the same size on the rear. The cast wheels were of Laverda's own manufacture. The model was initially finished in red or blue with orange flashes.

==== Second series ====
In early 1978, a number of changes were made. 38 mm (1.5 in) Marzocchi front forks and yokes replaced the Ceriani items, a BTZ electronic ignition replaced the Bosch unit, and the petrol tank now carried badges instead of transfers.

=== 1200 Jota America ===
The 1200 Jota America was produced to comply with the US-DOT regulations. These included a left-side gearchange. The crossover linkage and rear brake master cylinder caused the footrests to be located in less than ideal positions.

=== Mirage ===
The Mirage was a higher performance version of the 1200 instigated by the UK importers, Slater Bros. Following the success of the Jota, Richard Slater turned his attention to the 1200. 4C cams and a Jota exhaust was fitted. The name Mirage was suggested by Laverda's sales manager Luciano Zucarelli. Machines were shipped from the factory minus the exhaust and nameplates which were fitted in the UK. Following a request from Slater that the Mirage should be a different colour to other 1200s, from July 1978 they were finished in metallic green. Universally known as the 'Green Mirage', this version has become the most sought-after 1200.

==== Formula Mirage ====
A limited number (estimates vary between 14 and 17) of higher performance Formula Mirage models were built by the UK importer Slaters. These had a higher compression ratio and 7C endurance racing camshafts. A one-piece fibreglass seat and tank and matching fairing were fitted. As fibreglass petrol tanks were outlawed in some jurisdictions, a 2.5 gallon metal tank was fitted under the fibreglass.

=== 30th Anniversary 1200 ===
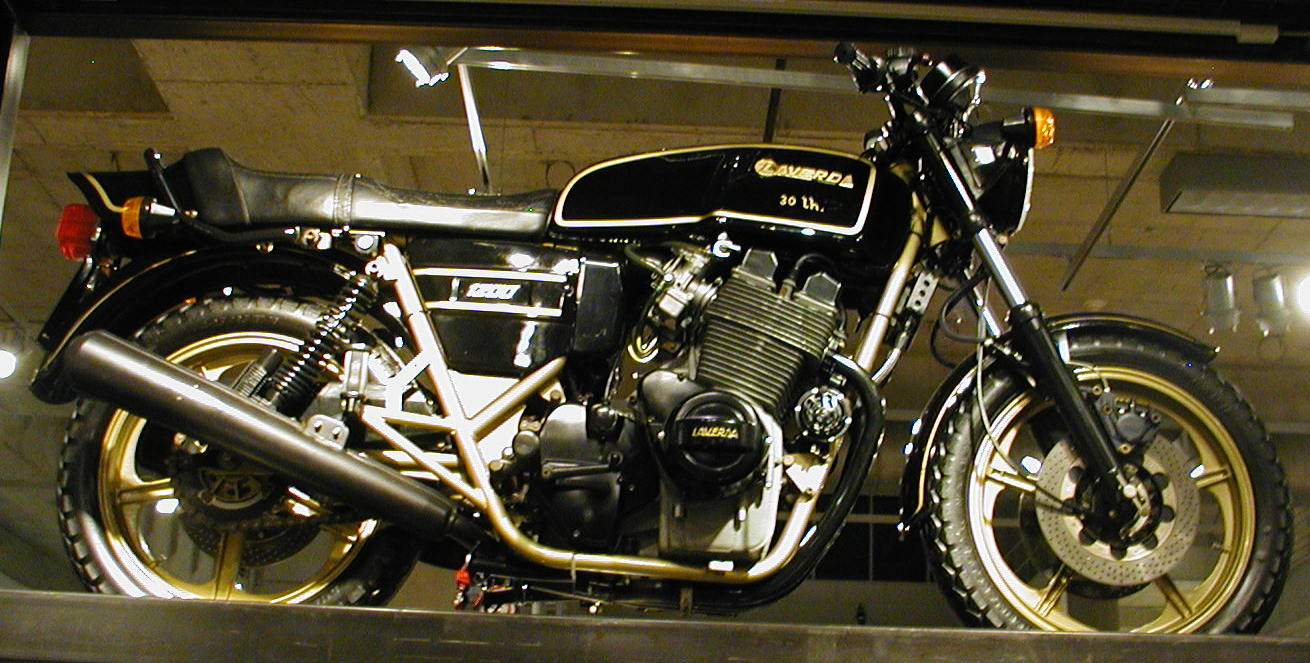
Laverda 30th Anniversary 1200

To celebrate 30 years of motorcycle production, Laverda announced in 1979 that they would produce a limited edition 30th Anniversary 1200 model. 200 of these were produced, although fewer than 50 were sold to the public. The remainder were sold to the Libya Police Force.

A hydraulic clutch and drilled discs were fitted. This was the first Laverda to be fitted with these items. The engine was fitted with larger inlet valves, as used on the Jota. The model was finished in Black and gold with the chrome parts finished black chrome, the engine covers were also finished in black. A handle bar fairing and seat cover that were unique to this model. The steering nut was gold plated.

Every bike was supplied with a personalised letter from Massimo Laverda and a gold medal with the owner's picture etched on it.

=== 1200TS ===
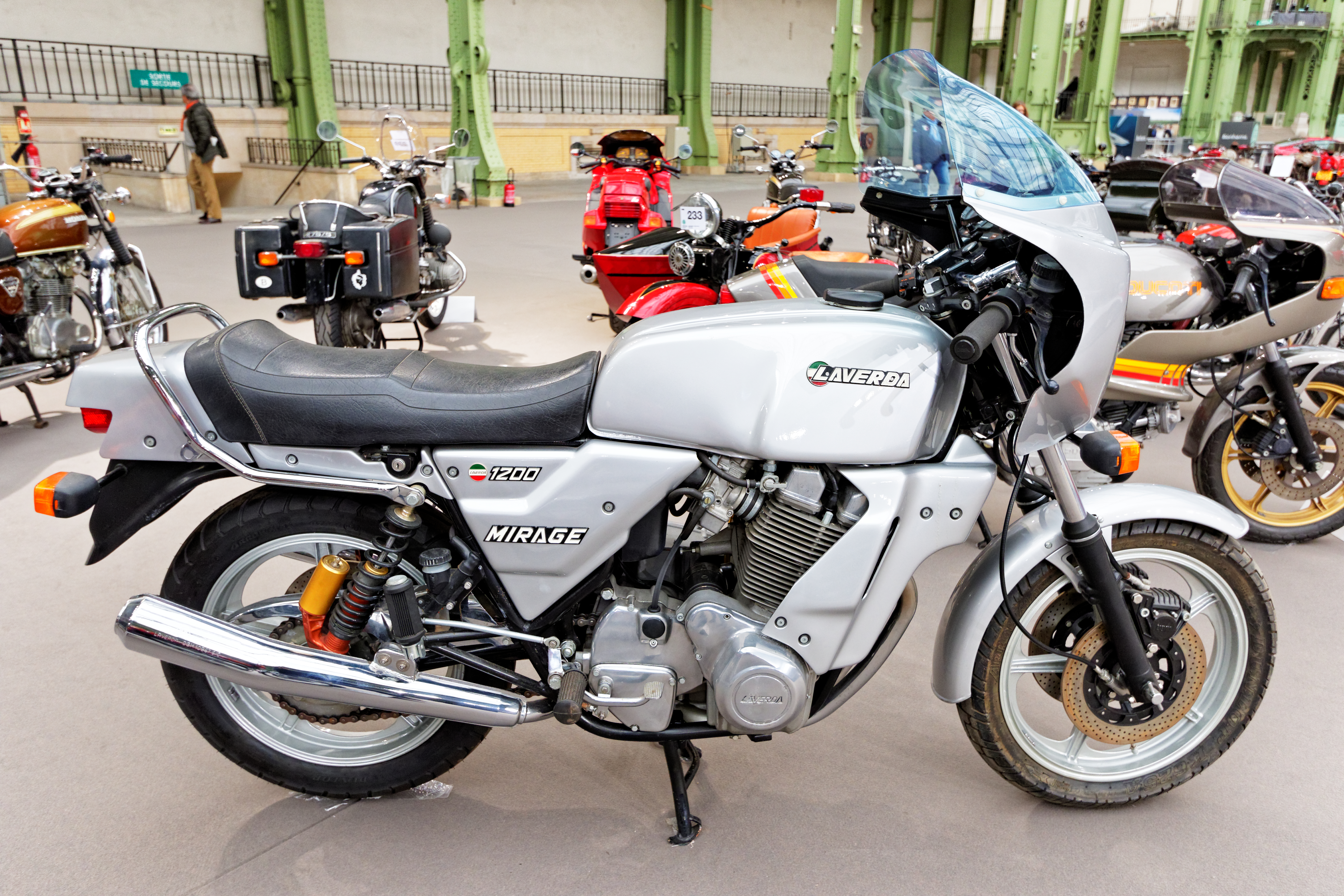
Laverda 1200TS Mirage

Carrying on with the Gran Turismo concept, the 1200TS was introduced in 1979. It featured a handlebar fairing, engine-hugging fiberglass lowers and a new tail section on the seat. Most TS models were finished in silver with maroon coachlines. In 1980 larger inlet valves were fitted and in 1981 a larger Nippon Denso alternator was fitted and the ignition pick-ups moved to the primary side.

For the American market softer touring cams were fitted along with more restrictive exhausts and noise-cancelling baffles in the airbox.

==== 1200TS Mirage ====
Slaters had agreed with the factory for the Mirage to be marketed worldwide. The model has been 'sanitised' by the factory to meet worldwide legislation. Whilst supposed to be a high-performance version of the TS, the differences were minor.

=== Austrian models ===
Austrian Laverda importer Werner Sulzbacher, in conjunction with engineer Franz Laimboeck, produced a number of tuned cafe-racer versions, including the 1,172 cc (71.5 cu in) 1200SC and 1,290 cc (79 cu in) 1300SC.

== Bibliography ==
- Abhi (15 March 2015). "In NZ – 1981 Laverda Formula Mirage". Bike-urious.
- Alós, Jaume, ed. (5 July 2020). "Laverda 1200 30 Aniversario, una moto con oro de 24k" [Laverda 1200 30th Anniversary, A Motorcycle With 24k Gold]. Galhand (in Spanish). Archived from the original on 28 November 2022.
- Heyl, Gerrit (November 1979). "Linzer Kraftwerk" (PDF). Motorrad (in German). pp. 16–22.
- Minton, Dave (August 1978). "Quick Spin Laverda 1200 Mirage" (PDF). Which Bike. pp. 64–67.
- Parish, Greg. "DAM Laverda 30th Anniversary". www.thedam.com.au.
- Smith, Robert (3 June 2009). "The Laverda Jota 1000". Motorcycle Classics.
- Woodbury, Nolan (2 January 2020). "Laverda 1200". Woodbury Moto Media.
- "1000/1200 cc". laverdamania.net. Archived from the original on 26 February 2022.
- "Austrian Laverda Catalogue" (PDF). Laverda Österreich. 1978.
- "Cycle Road Test - Laverda 1200 Jota America" (PDF). Cycle. June 1978. pp. 32–37, 96–97.
- "Jota's Bigger Brother: 1978-82 Laverda 1200 Jota America/Mirage". Motorcycle Classics. 12 November 2019.
- "LAVERDA 1200 specs - 1978, 1979, 1980, 1981, 1982". autoevolution.
