= Healey 1000/4 =

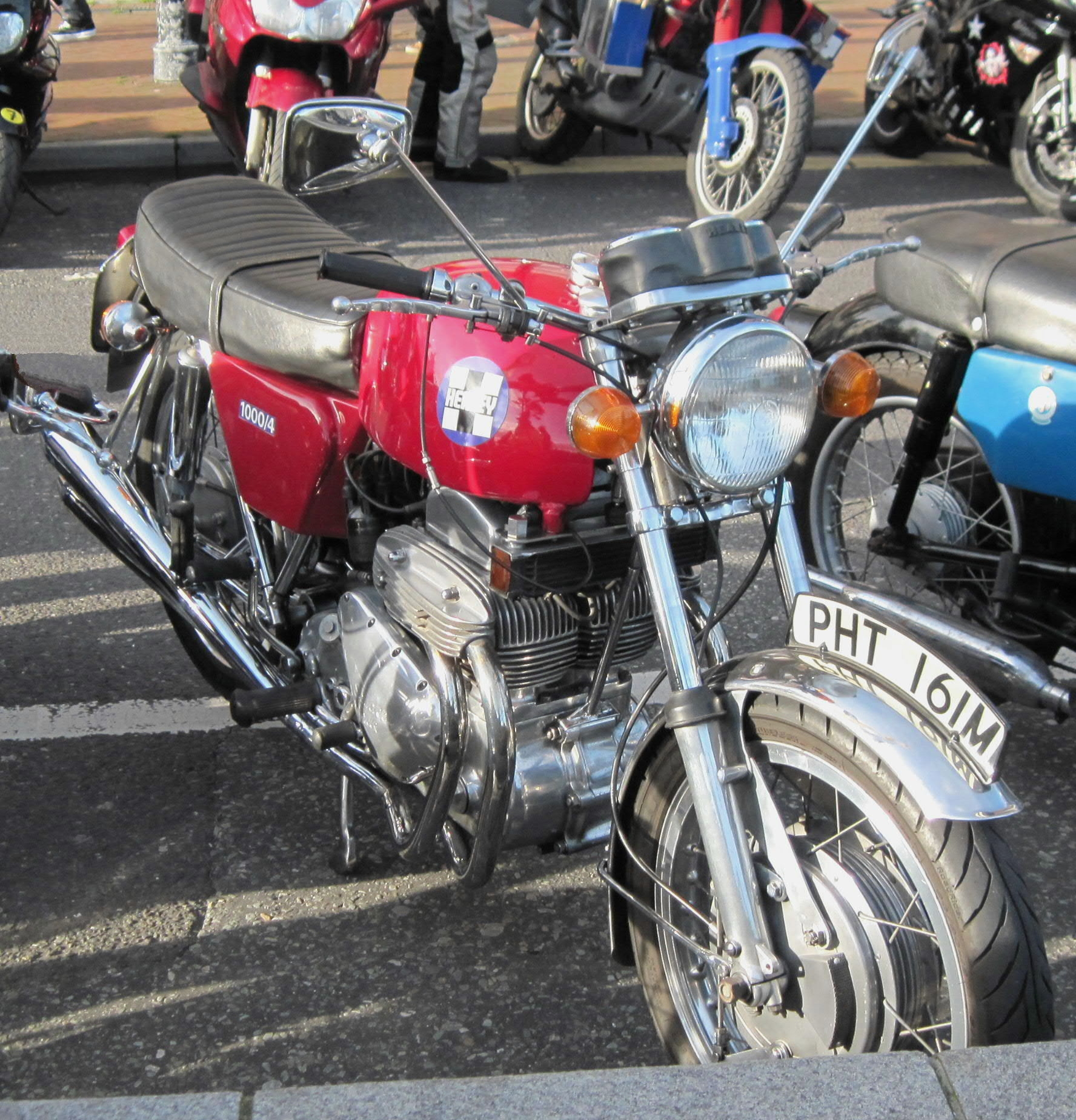
- Healey 1000/4 with oil cooler visible under front of fuel tank at Bike Night 2014 in Poole (Dorset, England)
- Manufacturer: Healey Motorcycles, Bromsgrove , Worcestershire
- Production: 1971-77
- Engine: 997 cc OHV square four
- Top speed: 120 mph (190 km/h)
- Power: 52bhp @ 6,000rpm
- Transmission: Four-speed gearbox to chain final drive
- Brakes: Drum or disc front, drum rear
- Weight: 355 pounds (161 kg) (dry)

The Healey 1000/4 is a British motorcycle made by the Healey brothers between 1971 and 1977. Fitted with an improved Ariel Square Four 1000 cc engine, the Healey was cheaper than a Honda Gold Wing, but only 28 Healey motorcycles were ever built.

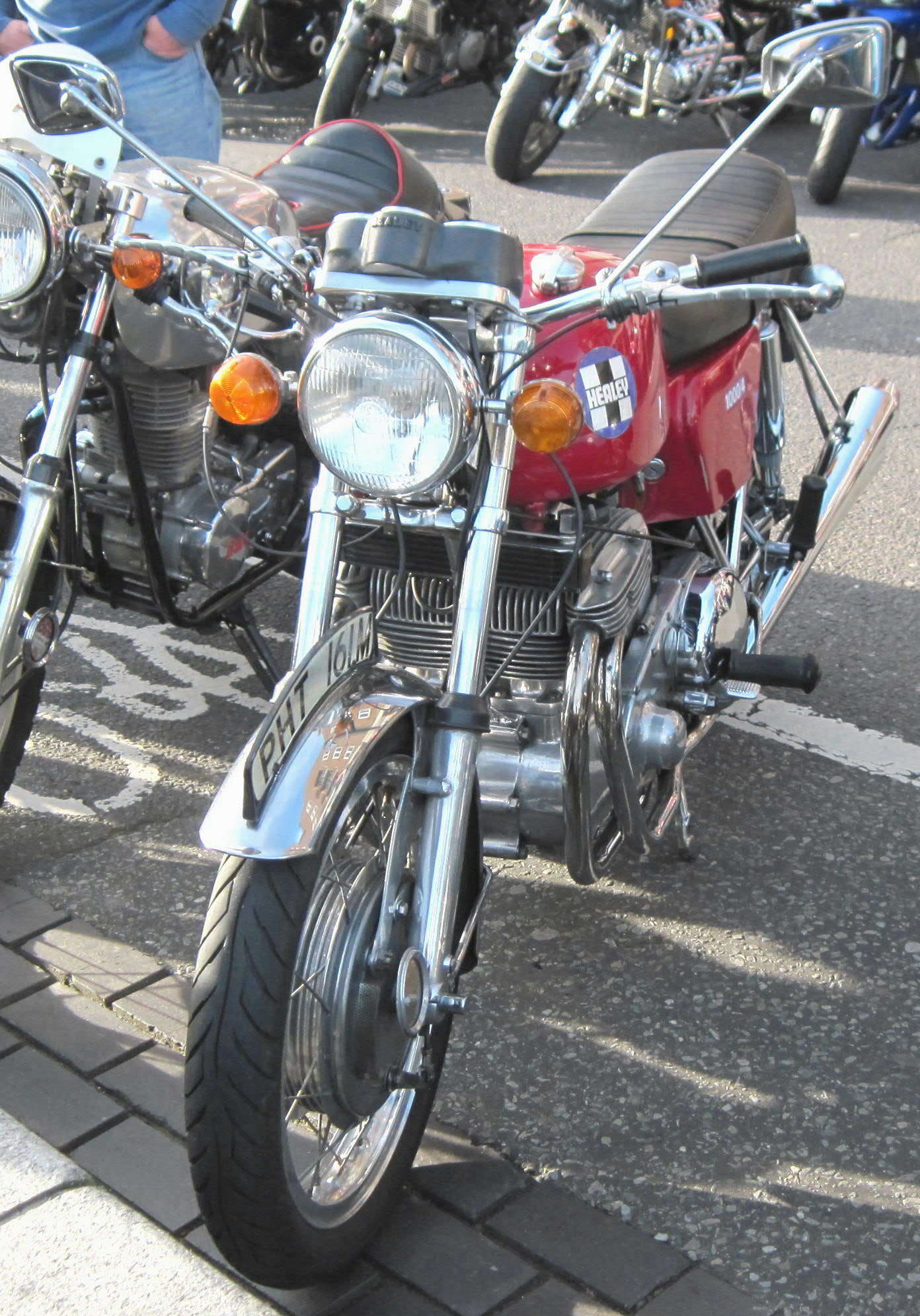

== Development ==
Originally designed by Edward Turner in 1928, the dry-sump Ariel Square Four was the only British motorcycle engine with four cylinders arranged to form a square. The front two cylinders powered one crankshaft while the rear two drove a second. Unlike contemporary British parallel twins, each crankshaft had a 180° configuration, the two crankshafts being linked by a helical gear so that diagonally opposed pistons moved in unison. The engine had even ignition intervals, and was said to be smooth, with little vibration.

Brothers George and Tim Healey were Ariel Square Four enthusiasts who upgraded the big 1000 cc engines for racing throughout the 1960s, tuning the performance and building a supercharged sprint motorcycle which doubled the power output. When Ariel ended production of the Square Four the Healey brothers obtained a large assortment of spare parts, and in 1971 began production of the Healey 1000/4 at a small workshop in Bartlett Road, Redditch, close to the old Royal Enfield factory. The entire staff consisted of the two brothers, mechanic Paul Mayhew, and a secretary. The 1000 cc square-four engine was antiquated, but the aim was to tune it for increased power and install it in a modern motorcycle frame. The prototype used Metal Profile Forks and a steel spine frame that contained the oil tank. The Healeys also made improvements to the lubrication of the engine, adding an oil cooler, an upgraded oil pump and a big capacity oil filter. Power was increased from 45 to 52 bhp, through the use of a special camshaft and a 7.5:1 compression ratio. Launched at the 1971 Earls Court Motorcycle Show, the Healey 1000/4 was well received. A batch of Egli-type frames was then produced on site at Bartleet Road.

The Healey 1000/4 was lightweight and was said to handle well, and it achieved a best speed of 126 mph in road tests. At 355 lbs the Healey weighed only around 30 lbs more than the Honda 250 of the same year. But in the early 1970s, established British manufacturers such as BSA were struggling for survival; and similarly the Healey 1000/4 could not compete with new Japanese super bikes, such as the Honda CB750, which were cheaper and faster. Tim Healey moved on to specialist tuning work with Laverda. His brother George soldiered on, but the workshop closed in 1977 with just 28 finished bikes and conversion kits produced. Today, the few surviving Healeys are highly sought after by enthusiasts.
