= Ariel Square Four =

Ariel motorcycle

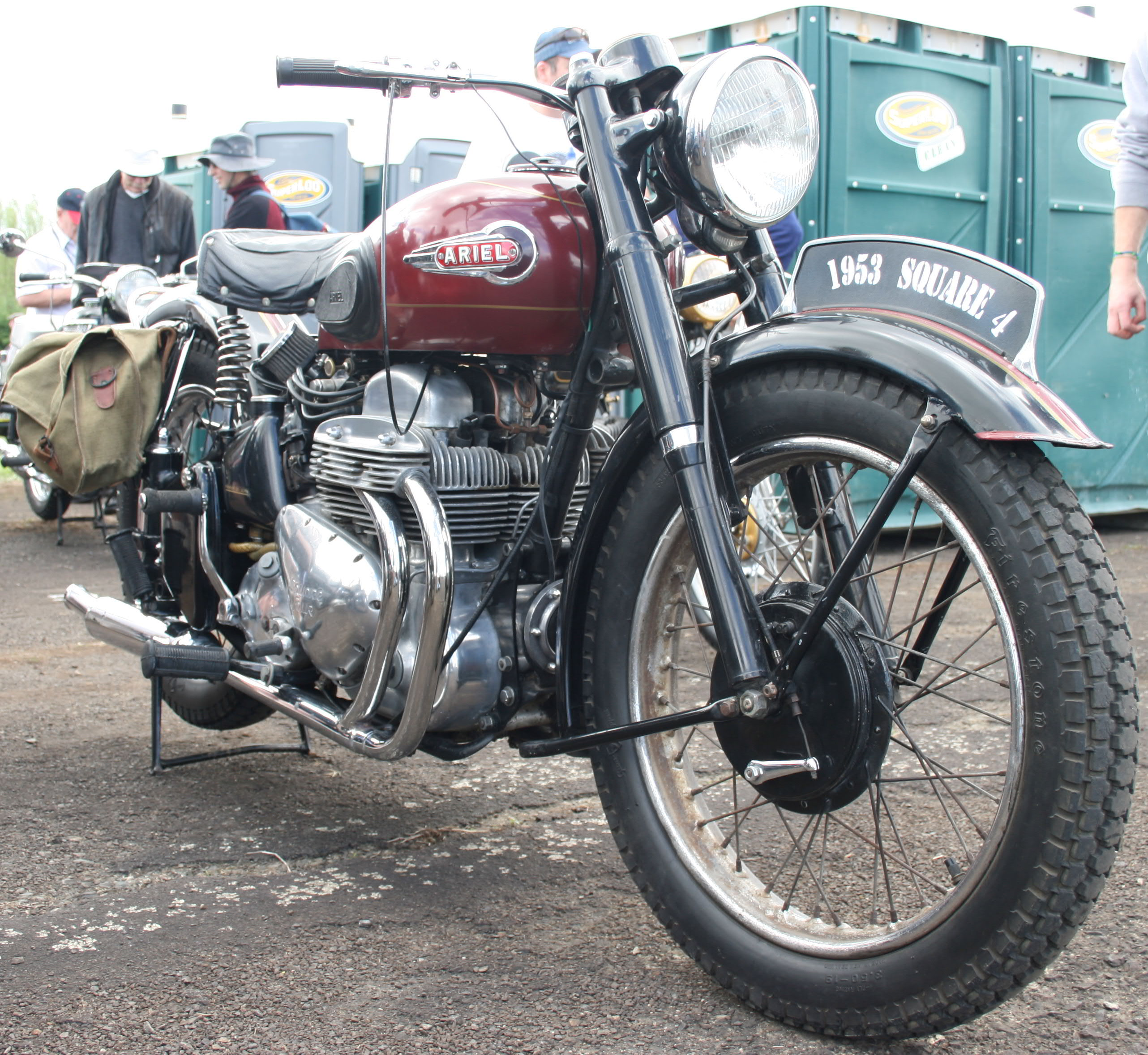
- Manufacturer: Ariel Motors Ltd, Bournbrook, Birmingham
- Also called: 'Squariel'
- Production: 1931–1959
- Engine: 995 cc (60.7 cu in); 498 / 601 cc (30.4 / 36.7 cu in), 4-stroke, square four, air-cooled, OHV, 8-valve, SU MC2 carburettor
- Bore / stroke: 65 mm × 75 mm (2.6 in × 3.0 in); 51 mm / 56 mm × 61 mm (2.0 in / 2.2 in × 2.4 in)
- Power: 40 bhp (30 kW) @ 5,800 rpm
- Transmission: 4-speed manual gearbox to chain final drive
- Frame type: Tubular single loop
- Brakes: Drums, 7 inch front, 8 inch rear
- Tyres: 3.25 x 19 inch front, 4.00 x 18 inch rear
- Wheelbase: 1.422 m (4 ft 8.0 in)
- Dimensions: L: 82 in (2,100 mm)
- Seat height: 0.787 m (2 ft 7.0 in)
- Weight: 425 lb (193 kg) (dry)
- Fuel capacity: 5 imp gal (23 L; 6.0 US gal)

The Square Four is a motorcycle produced by Ariel between 1931 and 1959, designed by Edward Turner, who devised the Square Four engine in 1928. At this time he was looking for work, showing drawings of his engine design to motorcycle manufacturers. The early engine with "two transverse crankshafts" was essentially a pair of 'across frame' OHC parallel twins joined by their geared central flywheels, with a four-cylinder block (or Monobloc) and single head. The idea for the engine was rejected by BSA, but adopted by Ariel. Thus it became the Ariel Square Four.

In 1966 Phil Vincent wrote in Motor Cycle: "Alas, in 1959 the Square Four went out of production, a victim of the modern trend towards small, high-revving modern power units. The demand had tailed off a bit, and with reduced output, the price would have had to be hoisted excessively high. At the time it was approaching £350—out of reach of all but a few of the potential buyers."

A further development was the Healey 1000/4 based on an updated Square Four, produced between 1971 and 1977.

== 4F (1931–1936) ==
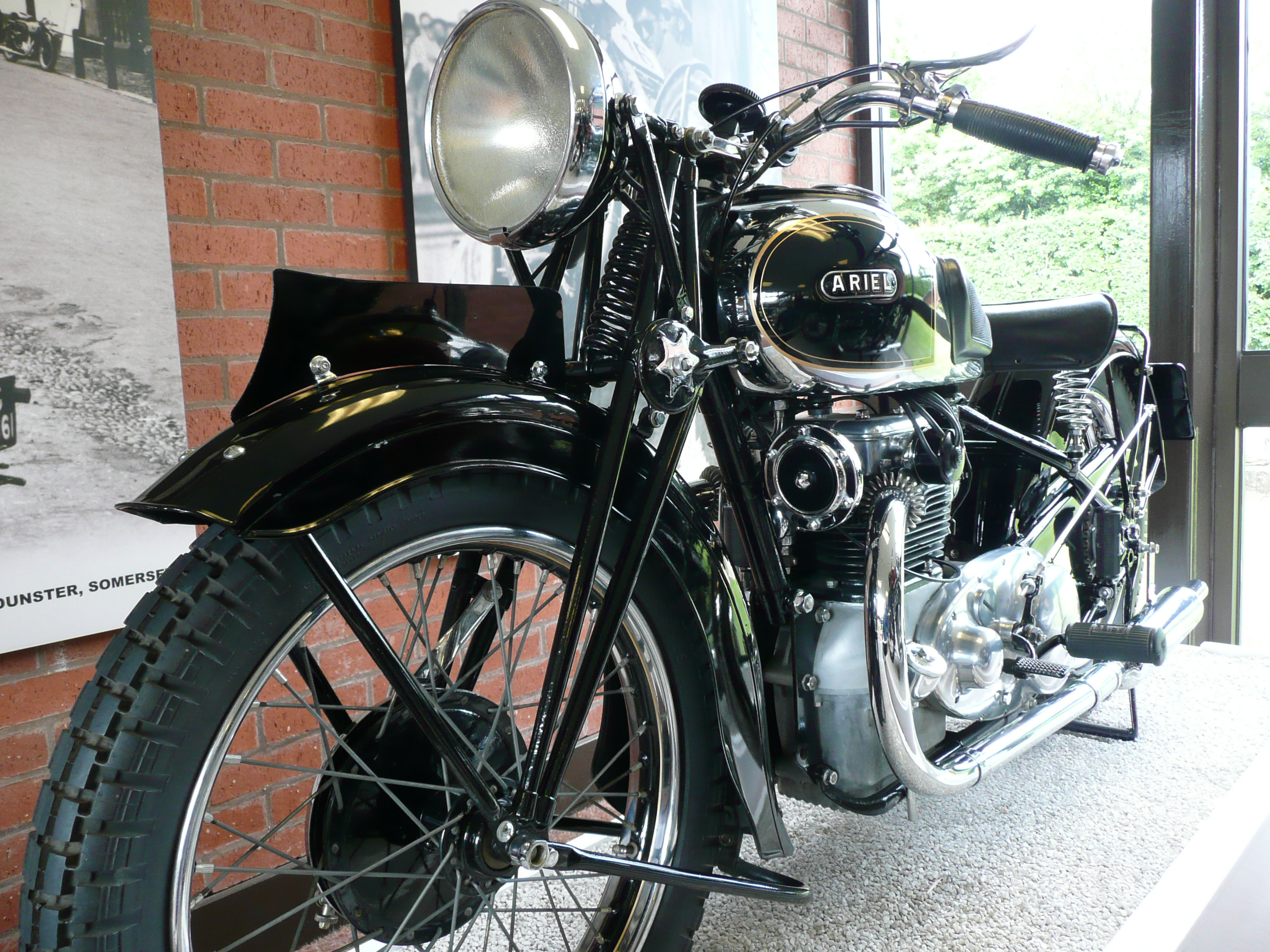
Ariel Square Four 600 cc 1935 (at the National Motorcycle Museum (UK)

The first Ariel Square Four 4F was shown at the Olympia Motorcycle Show in 1930, in chain driven overhead-camshaft 500 cc form. Early Square Fours used a hand-change, four-speed Burman gearbox.

In 1932, the cylinder bores were enlarged by 5 mm to give a capacity of 601 cc, specifically to accommodate owners who wanted a sidecar. This model was used for the Maudes Trophy test, covering 700 miles (1,127 km) in 700 minutes, followed by a timed lap of 87.4 mph (140.7 km/h). (In 1923 a Mr George Pettyt, of Maudes Motor Mart, had donated a "challenge trophy" for the ACU to award each year for the most meritorious, observed endurance test for motorcycles, known as the Maudes Trophy).

== 4G (1936–1949) ==
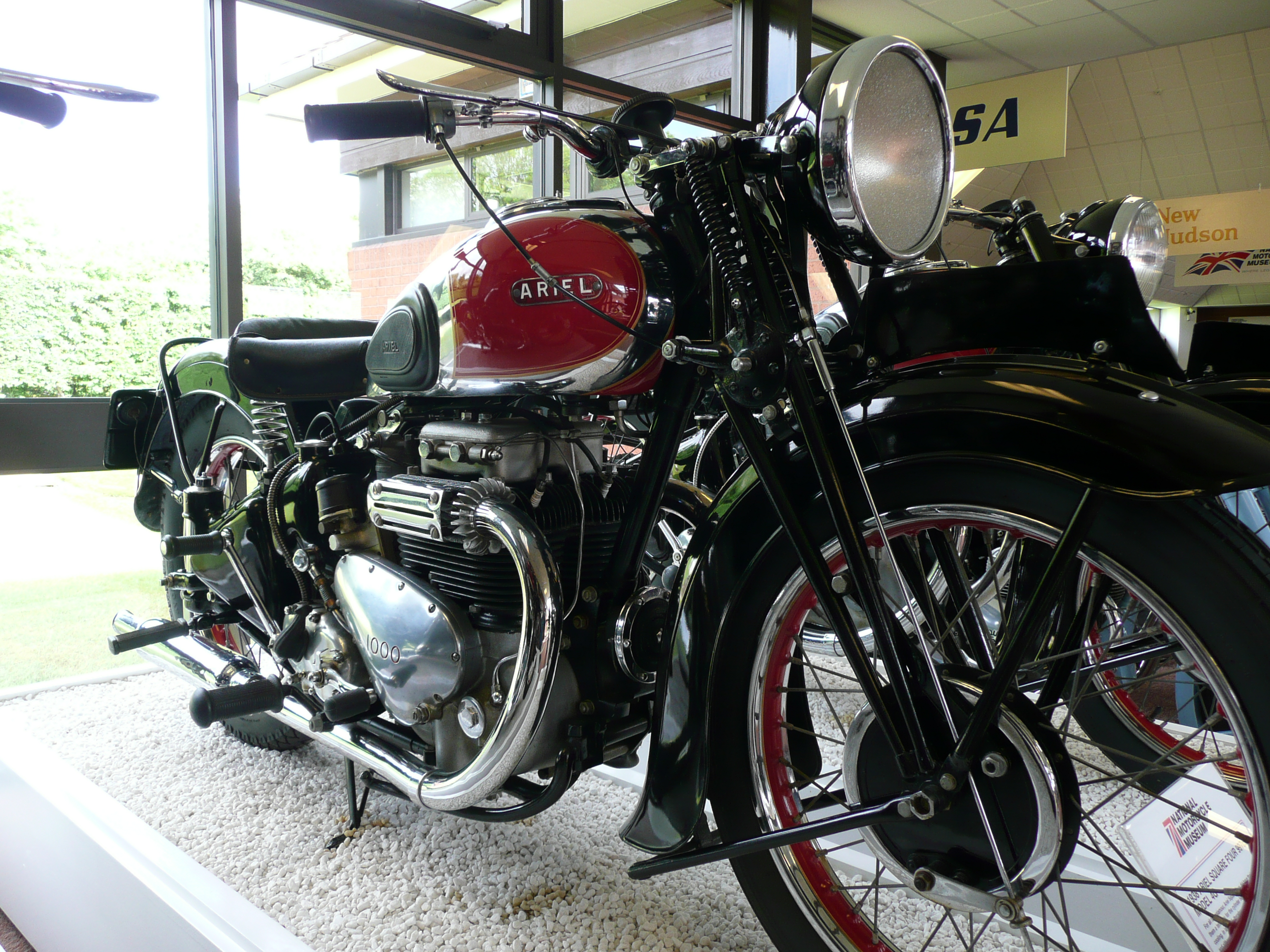
Ariel Square Four 4G 1938

The "Cammy" engine gained a reputation for overheating the rear cylinder heads, so in 1936 the engine was completely redesigned, emerging as the 1937 OHV 995 cc model 4G. In 1939 Ariel's patented Anstey-link plunger rear suspension became an option.

In 1946, the plunger rear was available again, and oil damped telescopic front forks replaced the previous girder type.

== Mark I (1949–1953) ==
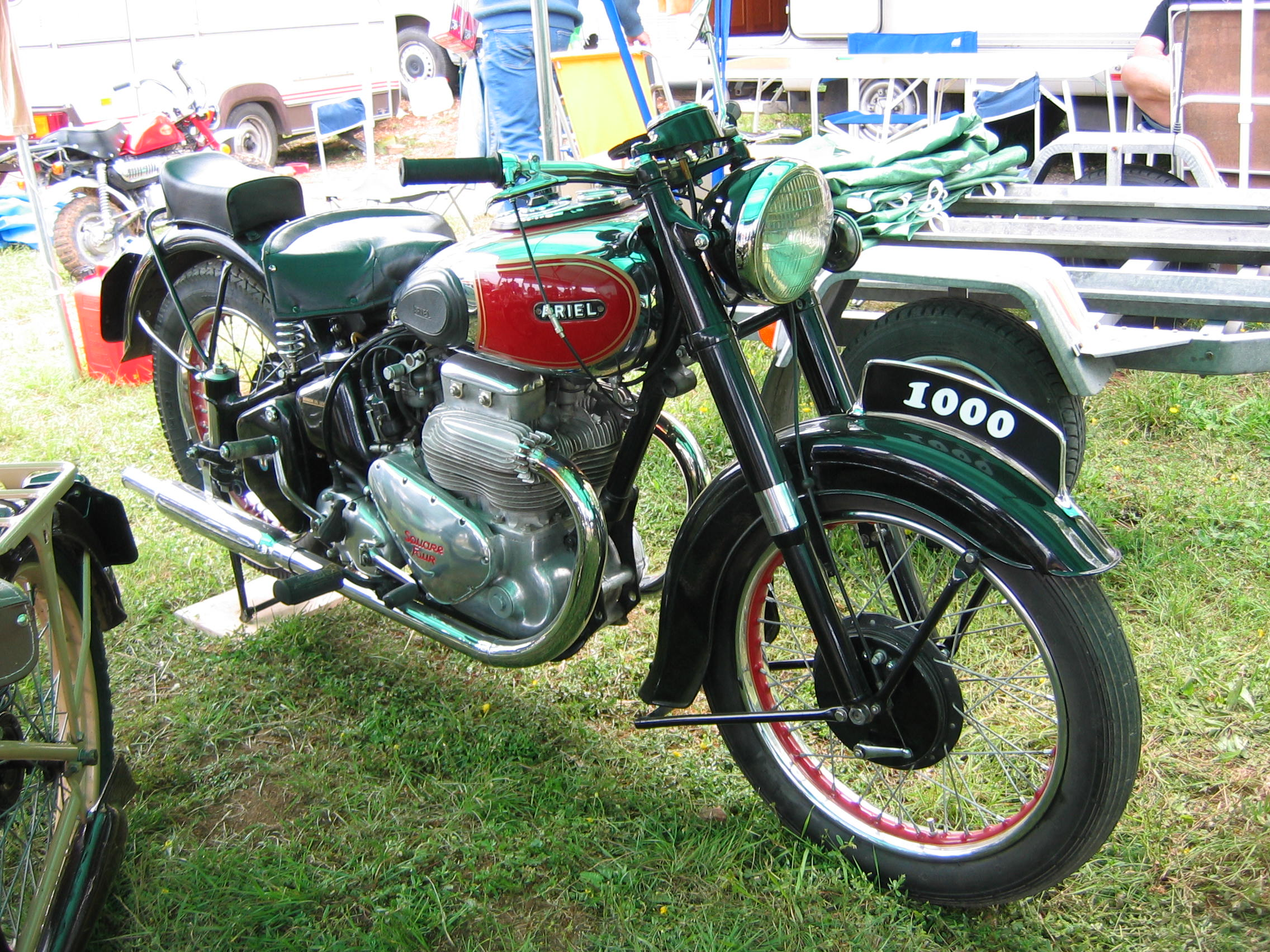
Two-pipe alloy engine

In 1949, the Ariel Square Four Mark I saw the cast-iron cylinder head and barrel replaced by the alloy head and barrel. This saved about 30 pounds (14 kg) in weight. The 1949 machine weighed around 435 lb (197 kg) dry, produced 35 bhp (26 kW) at 5,500 rpm. The Mark I was capable of 90 mph-plus.

== Mark II (1953–1959) ==
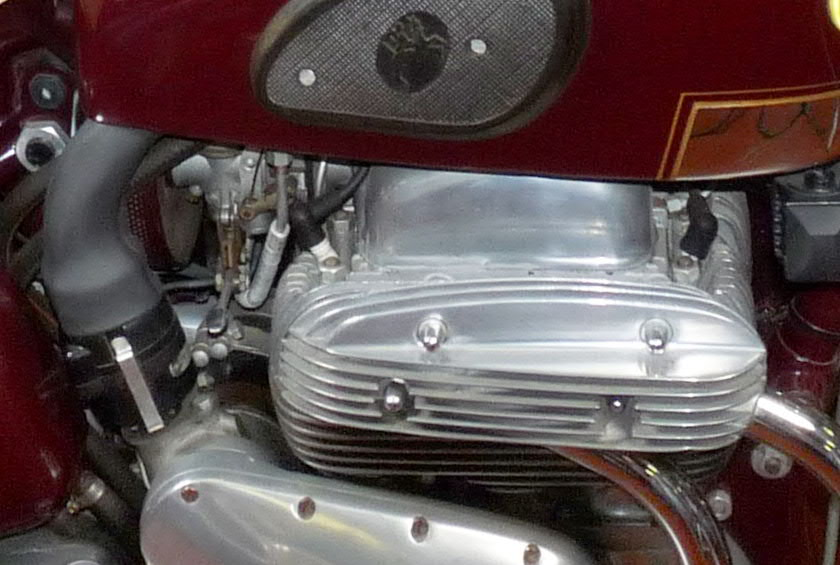
MkII upper engine detail showing bolt-on cast aluminium exhaust manifolds, high-mounted carburettor with high inlet stub cast into the rocker box, and the rear-mounted distributor

In 1953, the 'four pipe' 997 cc Ariel Square Four Mk II was released. The MkII featured a re-designed cylinder head with four separate exhaust pipes from two cast-aluminium manifolds and a rocker-box combined with the inlet manifold. A redesigned frame provided clearance for the high-mounted, tall, car-type, SU carburettor. This 40 hp (30 kW) Square Four was capable of 100 mph (160 km/h). It weighed 425 lb (193 kg) and cost ~£336.

In 1954, Ariel built prototypes of a Mk3 with Earles forks, but the model was never put into production.

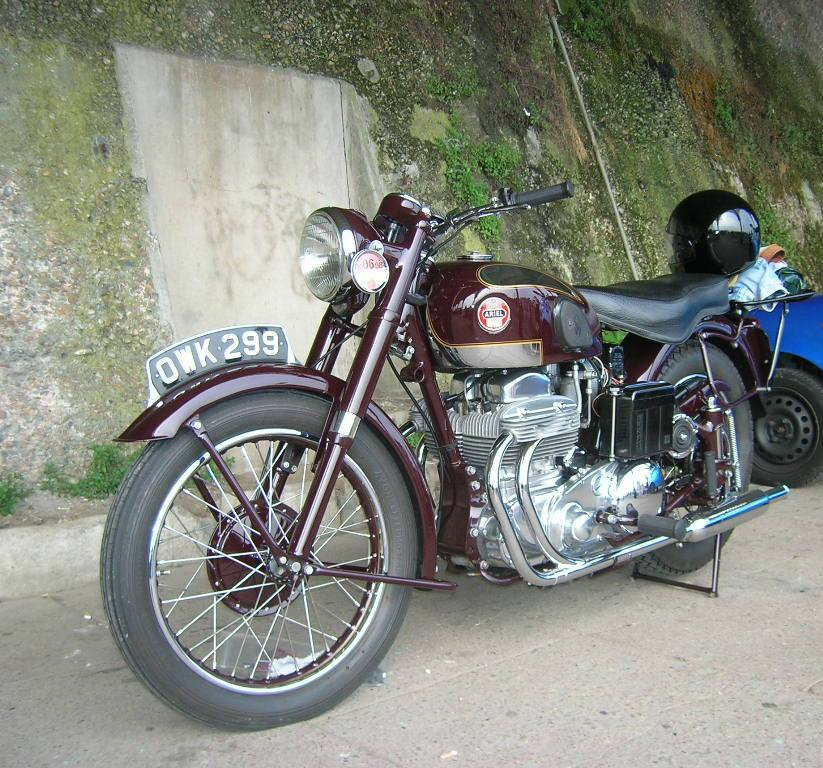
Mk2 1000cc Ariel Square Four

In 1959, Square Four production, along with that of all other Ariel four-stroke models, ceased.

== Production ==
Model	Years produced	Production
4F-500	1931–1932	927
4F-600	1932–1940	2,674
4G-1000	1936–1948	4,288
Mk I	1949–1953	3,922
Mk II	1953–1958	3,828
All Models	1931–1958	15,639

== Pre-war model designations ==
- 1931–1932: 498 cc 4F/31 Square Four.
- 1932: 498 cc 4F Square Four.
- 1932–1936: 601 cc 4F/600 Square Four.
- 1937–1948: 995 cc 4G Square Four.
- 1939: 599 cc 4F/600 Square Four.

== See also ==
- Healey 1000/4. An updated Square Four-based motorcycle made between 1971 and 1977
- List of motorcycles of the 1930s
